= List of military theorists and writers =

This is a list of military theorists and writers. Its focus is on military theory (military science and military strategy) and military history from ancient times to the present.

== Introduction ==
The list is broadly defined. It provides an alphabetical overview of important authors in the field of military science and military strategy, including military thinkers, military theorists, military authors, strategists, military historians, memorabilia writers, and others. The list does not claim to be complete or up-to-date. Various biographical details, major works, and other relevant information are provided.

Famous works include, for example, The Art of War by Sunzi (Sun Wu), The Art of War by Machiavelli, On War by Carl von Clausewitz, or Guerrilla Warfare (La guerra de guerrillas) by Che Guevara.

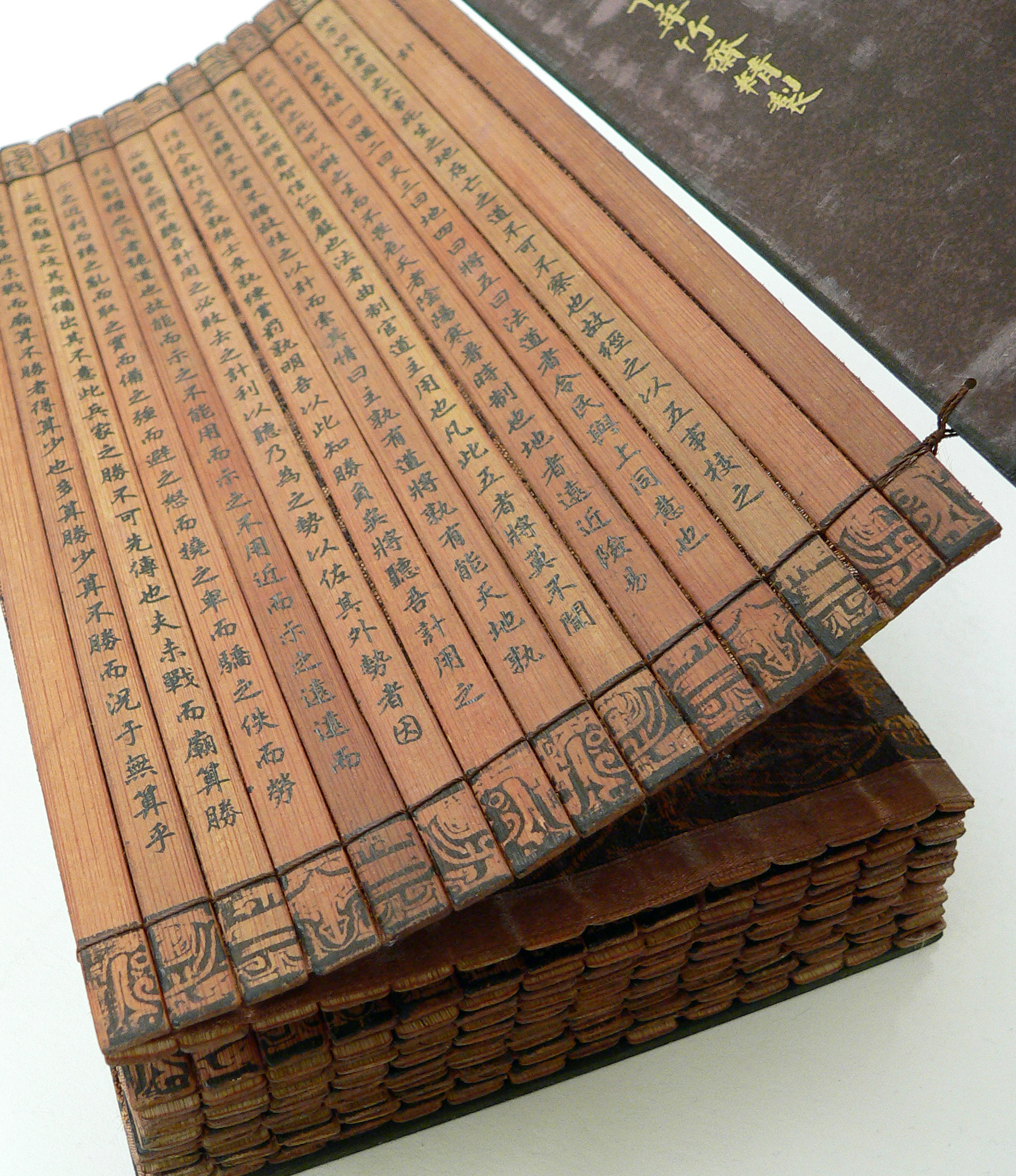
Sunzi bingfa 孫子兵法

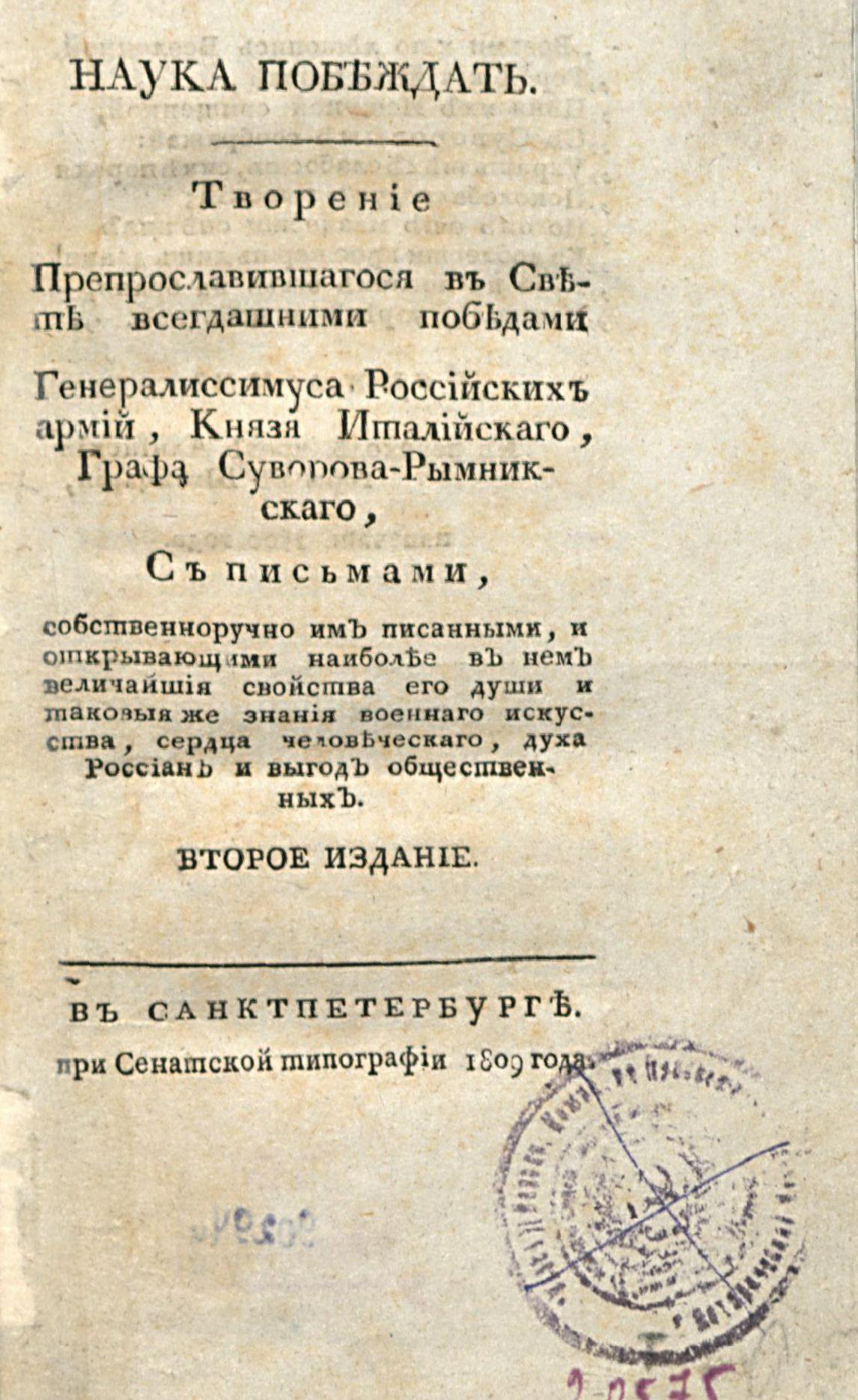
Suvorov: The Art of Victory Наука побеждать (2nd edition, 1809)

FM 34-45: Tactics, Techniques, and Procedures Electronic Attack (U.S. Army Field Manual)

== List ==
=== A ===
- Donald Abenheim (born 1953), US military historian
- Youssef H. Aboul-Enein (de) (born 1970), American military officer and military writer; Islamic Rulings on Warfare (with Sherifa Zuhur)
- Dmitry Adamsky (born 1978); professor in the School of Government, Diplomacy and Strategy at the IDC Herzliya / Reichman University, in Israel; The Russian Way of Deterrence: Strategic Culture, Coercion, and War (2023); Russian Nuclear Orthodoxy (Stanford, 2019); The Culture of Military Innovation (Stanford, 2010)
- Aelianus Tacticus (1st–2nd century), Greek military writer, Tactica
- Georg von Alten (de) (1846–1912), general, military writer, editor of Handbuch für Heer und Flotte. Enzyklopädie der Kriegswissenschaften und verwandter Gebiete (Handbook for the Army and Navy. Encyclopaedia of Military Science and Related Fields)
- Aniceto Afonso (de) (born 1942), Portuguese military historian, Guerra Colonial (with Carlos de Matos Gomes)
- Agathias (6th century), Eastern Roman historian, wrote about the wars of Justinian
- Aineas the Tactician (Aeneas Tacticus, first half of the 4th century BC), Greek strategist and military writer
- John R. Allen (born 1953), American military officer; Future War and the Defence of Europe (Oxford 2021, with Frederick B. Hodges and Julian Lindley-French)
- Ammianus Marcellinus (4th century), Roman historian
- James F. Amos (born 1946), United States Marine Corps general; the US Army manual FM 3-24 Counterinsurgency was created by General David H. Petraeus and him
- Gerhard von Amyntor (1831–1910) (Dagobert von Gerhardt), military officer and writer; Der Antagonismus Frankreichs und Englands vom politisch-militairischen Standpunkte und die Wahrscheinlichkeit einer französischen Truppenlandung auf der englischen Südküste (1860)
- John Antal (born 1955), American author and US Army veteran, contributions to military anthologies such as Maneuver Warfare, Digital War and By Their Deeds Alone
- Aleksei Antonov (1896–1962), General of the Soviet Army, from 1945 to 1946 Chief of the General Staff of the Armed Forces of the Soviet Union; operational art and staff theory; left a Chief of Staff war diary
- Appian, Roman historian, wrote about the Roman civil wars
- Arkolay (i.e., Johann Woldemar Streubel) (1827–1873, Illenau Asylum), Saxon military writer
- Armand von Ardenne (1848–1919), general, military writer
- John Arquilla (born 1954), American political scientist (Professor and Chair at the Department of Defense Analysis)
- Arrian (c. 85/90 – after 145/46), The Campaigns of Alexander on the campaigns of Alexander the Great
- Robert B. Asprey (1923–2009), US officer, military writer; War in the Shadows: The Guerrilla in History (1975)
- Edouard Edmond Aublet (1854-1895), French officer, military writer; La guerre au Dahomey, 1888-1893: d'après les documents officiels (Berger-Levrault, Paris/Nancy 1894)
- Hyacinthe Aube (1826–1890), French admiral and Minister of the Navy, co-founder of the Jeune École
- Mariano d'Ayala (1808–1877), Italian military officer, politician, and writer

=== B ===
- Muhammad Ali Baig, Pakistan political scientist; US-China Strategic Competition Military Strategy and Contemporary Doctrine (2025)
- William Balck (1858–1941), general, military writer; Taktik (6 volumes, Eisenschmidt, Berlin, c. 1900-10); Entwickelung der Taktik im Weltkriege (2nd, significantly expanded edition, Berlin 1922)
- Oreste Baratieri (1841–1901), Italian military officer and colonial administrator, served as the governor of Eritrea from 1892 to 1896; Memorie d´Africa (Turin 1898; French version: Mémoires d´Afrique (1892-1896), Paris 1899)
- Bardet de Villeneuve (es) (18th century), military writer and theorist; Cours de la science militaire à l'usage de l'infanterie, de la cavalerie, de l'artillerie, du génie et de la marine (1740)
- Étienne Alexandre Bardin (1774–1841), French general, author of a Manuel d’infanterie Digital copy (4th ed., Paris 1813) and the comprehensive Dictionnaire de l'armée de terre, ou Recherches historiques sur l'art et les usages militaires des anciens et des modernes. 17 vols., Paris: J. Corréard, 1841–1851 (Online excerpts: "Auteur militaire" & "Bibliothèque militaire")
- Muhammad Ahmad Bashmil (محمد بن أحمد باشميل), The Great Battle of Badr
- Christopher Bassford (born 1953), American military historian, The Spit-Shine Syndrome: Organizational Irrationality in the American Field Army, with a Foreword by Lt. Gen. Robert M. Elton (Greenwood Press, Westport, CT 1988)
- Jacques Baud (fr) (born 1955), member of the Swiss strategic intelligence service, security expert, Eastern Europe specialist
- Floribert Baudet (born 1971), Dutch military historian
- Wolf Stefan Traugott Graf von Baudissin (1907–1993), German lieutenant general, military theorist and peace researcher
- Alberto Bayo (1892–1967), Latin American revolutionary, author of 150 preguntas a un guerrillero (150 Questions to a Guerrilla Fighter), a guerrilla warfare manual
- Raimond de Beccarie de Pavie, Seigneur de Fourquevaux (1505/1508–1574), French noble, governor, military commander and diplomat during the latter Italian Wars and first French Wars of Religion; Instructions sur le fait de la Guerre (Paris 1548 – sélections)
- André Beaufre (1902–1975): French officer, military writer; An Introduction to Strategy; Strategy of Deterrence; Strategy of Action
- Ian F. W. Beckett (born 1950), British military historian; with John Pimlott (eds.): Counter-Insurgency. Lessons from History, London 1985 (ND Barnsley 2011); (ed.): The Roots of counter-insurgency. Armies and guerilla warfare, 1900-1945 (London 1988)
- Walther Beckmann (20th cent.), officer, military writer; (ed.) Unsere Kolonien und Schutztruppen - Das Ehrenbuch der Überseekämpfer - unter Mitarbeit von Major a.D. Otto Müller für die Abschnitte "Land und Leute" der afrikanischen Kolonien, sowie von Walter Merzdorf für die Abschnitte "Kolonien und Flotte", "Kiautschou" und "Südsee" (Kyffhäuser-Verlag, Berlin 1934); Ludendorff als Mensch und Feldherr (Berlin 1935); (ed.) Helden der Luft
- Heinrich Beitzke (1798–1867), military writer
- Guillaume du Bellay, Seigneur de Langeay (1491-1543); wrongly attributed: Instructions sur le fait de la guerre (Paris 1548) (with full title: Instructions sur le fait de la Guerre, extraites des livres de Polybe, Frontin, Vegece, Cornazan, Machiavelle, et plusieurs autres bons auteurs) (see under Raimond de Beccarie de Pavie, Seigneur de Fourquevaux)
- Albert Benary (1881–1963), officer and military writer
- Medea Benjamin (born 1952), an American political activist; Drone Warfare: Killing by Remote Control (2012)
- Samuel Bendett, political scientist, research analyst at the Center for Naval Analyses, analysis of military robotics, drones/UAVs, AI and Russian military weapons development
- Georg Heinrich von Berenhorst (1733–1814), military writer
- Karl Gustav von Berneck, pseudonym: Bernd von Guseck (1805–1871), novelist and military writer
- Friedrich von Bernhardi (1849–1930), Prussian cavalry general and military historian; Deutschland und der nächste Krieg (Germany and the Next War)
- Carlo Bianco (1795–1843), Italian revolutionary; Della guerra d'insurrezione nazionale per le bande applicata all'Italia (1830)
- Keith Bickel, US military historian
- Eugen Bircher (1882–1956), Swiss officer, military writer and politician
- Andrew J. Birtle (born 1957), US military historian (U.S. Army Center of Military History); U.S. Army counterinsurgency and contingency operations doctrine 1860-1941 (Washington, DC 1998), U.S. Army counterinsurgency and contingency operations doctrine 1942-1976 (Washington, DC 2006)
- Friedrich Wilhelm Graf von Bismarck (1783–1860), Württemberg lieutenant general, diplomat, military writer, responsible after the accession of William I for reorganizing the mounted forces, lifelong member of the chamber of Estates of Württemberg
- Geoffrey Blainey (born 1930), Australian historian; The Causes of War (1973)
- Louis Auguste Blanqui (1805–1881), French socialist revolutionary; Instructions pour une prise d'armes (1866)
- Willi A. Boelcke, German historian; So kam das Meer zu uns. Die preußisch-deutsche Kriegsmarine in Übersee, 1822–1914 (Ullstein, Frankfurt a. M./Berlin-West/Wien 1981)
- Albert von Boguslawski (de) (1834–1905), Der kleine Krieg und seine Bedeutung für die Gegenwart (Berlin 1881); he translated Précis de l'art de la guerre (Summary of the Art of War) of Jomini into German (Digital copy; Militärische Klassiker des In- und Auslandes)
- Daniel P. Bolger (born 1957), American military officer and military historian
- Brian Bond (1936–2025), British military historian; (ed.) Victorian Military Campaigns (London 1967)
- Viktor Nikolayevich Bondarev (born 1959), Russian colonel general, from August 2015 to September 2017 Commander of the Air and Space Forces; Грозное небо. Авиация в современных конфликтах / Thunder Sky: Aviation in Modern Conflicts (ed.)
- Ralph Bosshard (born 1966), Swiss security expert, military historian, and former general staff officer of the Swiss Army
- Honorat Bovet (14th century) (attributed): L'Arbre des batailles (Digital copy)
- John Boyd (1927–1997), military strategist, inventor of the OODA-Loop or decision cycle
- Antoine Fortuné de Brack (1789–1850), French general and military theorist; Avant-postes de cavalerie légère (Advance Posts of Light Cavalry) (1831)
- Horst-Heinrich Brauß (born 1953), German military officer
- Gary Brecher (born 1955), author of War Nerd (Warriors of War)
- Walter von Bremen (1852–?), Oberst; German officer; Die Kolonialtruppen und Kolonialarmeen der Hauptmächte Europas. Ihre geschichtliche Entwicklung und ihr gegenwärtiger Zustand (Bielefeld/Leipzig 1902)
- Arthur L. Bresler, military writer; Die Armee der Vereinigten Staaten in Nordamerika. Mit Abbildungen von Offizieren und Soldaten aller Truppengattungen, sowie von Uniforms- und Rangabzeichen, Ausrüstungsgegenständen, etc., nebst genauer Beschreibung der Uniformirung und Mittheilungen über Organisation, Stärke, Eintheilung und Dislocation der nordamerikanischen Armee, sowie der Milizen (M. Ruhl, Leipzig 1891)
- Antony Brett-James (1920–1984), British military historian
- Henri Alexis Brialmont (1821–1903), Belgian general and military writer
- Bernard Brodie (1910–1978): War and Politics (1973); Strategy in the Missile Age (1959)
- Reinhard Brühl (de) (1924-2018), German officer, director of the Militärgeschichtlichen Instituts der DDR; editor-in-chief of Wörterbuch zur deutschen Militärgeschichte (in 2 vols. = Schriften des Militärgeschichtlichen Instituts der Deutschen Demokratischen Republik; Berlin, Militärverlag der Deutschen Demokratischen Republik, 1985)
- Aleksei Brusilov (1853–1926), Russian and later Soviet general, most noted for the development of new offensive tactics used in the 1916 Brusilov offensive; Мои воспоминания. Из царской армии в Красную (My Memories: From the Tsarist Army to the Red [Army])
- Zbigniew Brzeziński (1928–2017), Polish-American diplomat and political scientist; The Grand Chessboard: American Primacy and Its Geostrategic Imperatives (1997)
- Semyon Budyonny (1883–1973), Cavalry commander, Marshal of the Soviet Union, his memoirs influencing operational thought; The Path of Valour: The memoirs of Marshal Semyon Budyonny on the Russian civil war (1972)
- Tanja Bührer (de) (born 1974), Swiss historian; edited together with Markus Pöhlmann, Daniel Marc Segesser: Globale Akteure an den Randzonen von Souveränität und Legitimität. (Leipziger Universitätsverlag, Leipzig 2013)
- Tor Bukkvoll (born 1966), Norwegian Russia-Ukraine expert, Norwegian Military Academy, military author; Iron Cannot Fight—The Role of Technology in Current Russian Military Theory (Journal of Strategic Studies, 2011)
- Thomas Robert Bugeaud de la Piconnerie (1784–1849), Marshal of France, largely responsible for the conquest of Algeria: La guerre des rues et des maisons
- Adam Heinrich Dietrich von Bülow (1757–1807), military writer; Neue Taktik der Neuern wie sie seyn sollte (Leipzig, 1805); Militärische und vermischte Schriften (Leipzig, 1853)
- Fritz-Otto Busch (1890–1971), German naval officer in the Imperial German Navy, the Reichsmarine and the Kriegsmarine; maritime and naval writer; (with Gerhard Ramlow) Deutsche Seekriegsgeschichte. Fahrten und Taten in zwei Jahrtausenden (four editions between 1939 and 1943)
- Valentin Busuioc (ro) (born 1965), Romanian poet and playwright

=== C ===
- James Cable (1920–2001), British diplomat and naval strategic thinker; Gunboat Diplomacy. Political Applications of Limited Naval Force (London 1971)
- Amílcar Cabral (1924–1973), one of Africa's foremost anti-colonial leaders; Unity and Struggle. Speeches and Writings (1979); La descolonización del Africa portuguesa: Guinea-Bissau (1975)

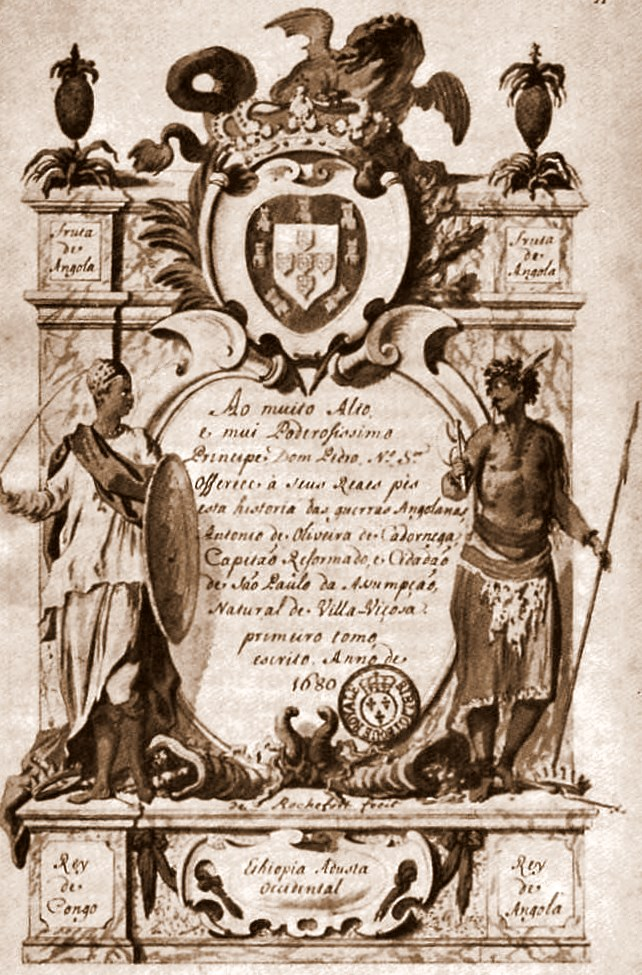
História geral das guerras angolanas (1680), by Capitão reformado e cidadão de S. Paulo da Assunção, natural de Vila Viçosa

- António de Oliveira de Cadornega (pt) (1623–1690), Portuguese military officer and historian who lived in Angola, História geral das guerras angolanas (General History of the Angolan Wars)
- Gaius Iulius Caesar (100–44 BC), author of Gallic Wars (De bello Gallico) and Alexandrian War
- Charles E. Callwell (1859–1928), British officer, military writer; Small Wars. Their Principles & Practice (published by Her Majesty's Stationery Office, London 1906)
- Raúl Castro (born 1931), Cuban Communist politician and general; Operación antiaérea en el Segundo Frente “Frank País”, en junio de 1958 (Anti-aircraft operation on the Second Front 'Frank País', in June 1958) (in Selección de discursos y artículos, 1959–1974, Editora Política, Havana 1988)
- Henri-Pierre Cathala, counterintelligence worker, author of Le temps de la désinformation (The Age of Disinformation) (Digital copy)
- Louis-Eugène Cavaignac (1802–1857), French general and politician; De la régence d'Alger, note sur l'occupation (Victor Magen, Paris 1839)
- Chanakya (c. 350–c. 283 BC), minister and closest advisor to the first emperor of the Maurya Empire Chandragupta Maurya, credited with the political treatise Arthashastra
- Vasily Chapayev (1887–1919), Red Army commander; influenced Soviet military thought; the novel Chapayev (Чапаев), published in 1923 by Dmitri Furmanov, contributed to the legend of Chapayev. Although it is not a direct memoir, the novel is largely based on Furmanov’s personal observations, diary entries, and experiences during the Civil War
- Samuel Charap (born 1980), US-American politologist, International Institute for Strategic Studies (Senior Fellow), Rand Corporation; (with Timothy J. Colton): Everyone Loses: The Ukraine Crisis and the Ruinous Contest for Post-Soviet Eurasia (2017)
- V. Chareton, capitaine (1869-1915); Les Corps Francs dans la guerre moderne. Les moyens à leur opposer. Étude historique et critique sur l'attaque et la défense des vois de communication et des services de l'arrière (Paris 1900); Comment la Prusse a préparé sa revanche
- Archduke Charles (1771–1847), Austrian commander and author of military writings
- J. B. A. Charras (1810–1865), lieutenant colonel, French officer and military writer, exiled after the coup d'état in 1851 in Brussels, died in Basel
- Paul Hay du Chastelet (1619-1682), military strategist and author; Traité de la guerre, ou politique militaire (chez Jean Guignard, 1668)
- Bernhard Chiari (born 1965), officer, military historian

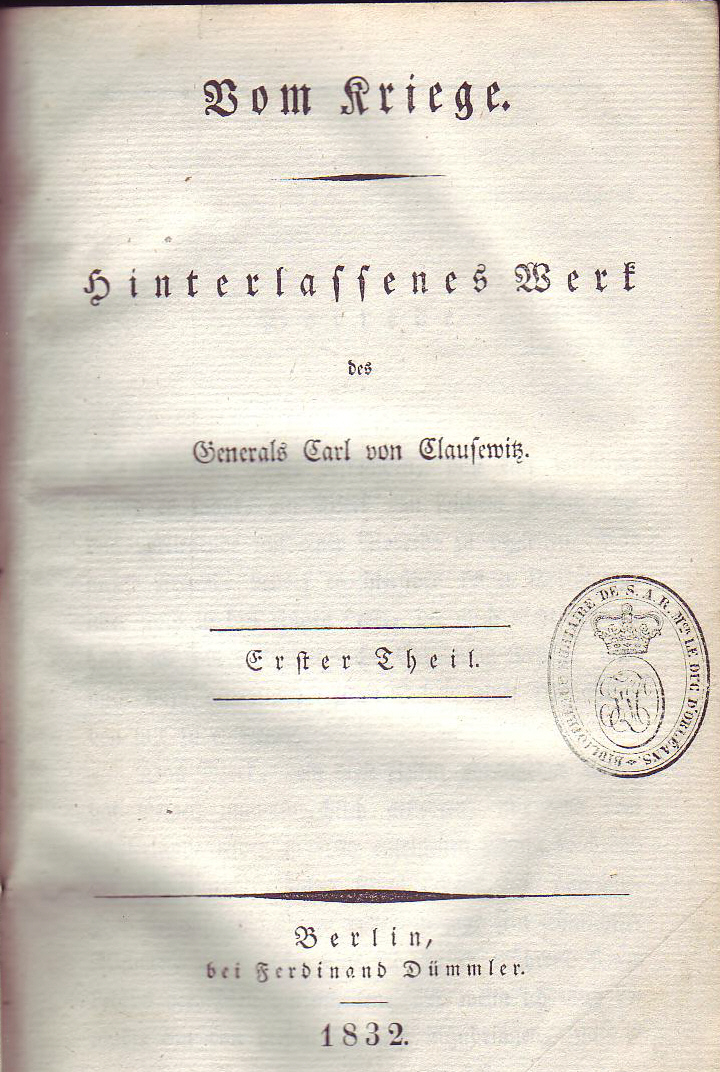
Carl von Clausewitz: Vom Kriege (Berlin 1832)

- Wojciech Chrzanowski (1793–1861), Polish general and military theorist
- Sergei Chvarkov (ru) (born 1961), Russian military scientist, professor at the Academy of Military Sciences; “Nauka o voyne—neobkhodimost’ ili dan’ mode?” Наука о войне – необходимость или дань моде? (“The Science of War: A Necessity or a Fashion?”) in Nezavisimoye Voyennoye Obozreniye (2020)
- James Connolly (1868–1916), Street Fighting (1915)
- Carl von Clausewitz (1780–1831), Prussian general and military theorist; Vom Kriege (On War)
- Julian Corbett (1854–1922), British naval historian and strategist; Some Principles of Naval Strategy (1911)
- Antonio Cornazzano (1429–1484), Italian author; De re militari (Digital copy*)
- Conrad C. Crane (born 1952), military strategist; director of the U.S. Army Military History Institute; Cassandra in Oz: Counterinsurgency and Future War (Naval Institute Press, Annapolis 2016)
- Martin van Creveld (born 1946), theorist of a new military science (guerrilla and terrorism); The Transformation of War (New York 1991)
- Michael Crowder (1934–1988), British historian interested in the history of West Africa; (ed.): West African Resistance. The military response to colonial occupation (London 1971)
- José Raimundo da Cunha Matos (1776–1839), Brazilian military historian, founding member of the Brazilian Historical and Geographical Institute
- Elisabeth B. Custer (1842–1933), widow of Brevet Major General Custer, memoir writer: Dicht am Feinde. Leben einer amerikanischen Offiziersfamilie im fernen Westen (Berlin 1887; Digital copy)

=== D ===
- Hans von Dach (1926–2003), Swiss officer, military writer, author of Total Resistance (Der totale Widerstand: Kleinkriegsanleitung für Jedermann) (Digital copy)
- Gustav Däniker (1896–1947), Swiss staff officer and military writer
- Gustav Däniker Jr. (1928–2000), Swiss divisional general and military publicist
- Leo Daugherty (born 1956), US military historian; Counterinsurgency and the United States Marine Corps. The First Counterinsurgency Era, 1899-1945 (Jefferson, NC 2015)
- Denis Vasilyevich Davydov (1784–1839), Russian officer, writer and poet; Theory of Partisan Warfare Опыт теории партизанского действия (1821)
- Régis Debray (born 1940), French author; Révolution dans la révolution ? : Lutte armée et lutte politique en Amérique latine (Maspero, Paris 1967)
- Carl von Decker (de) (1784–1844), Prussian officer, military writer; Der kleine Krieg im Geiste der neueren Kriegführung (Berlin 1822; 4. Aufl. 1844; 3rd ed.); Algerien und die dortige Kriegführung (Berlin 1842, vol. 1, part 2)
- Hans Delbrück (1848–1929), German historian and politician; Geschichte der Kriegskunst im Rahmen der politischen Geschichte (History of the Art of War within the Framework of Political History)
- B. C. Dening, Lieut. Col.; Modern War: Armies, not Air Forces, decide wars (1937)
- Desroziers, capitaine: Combats de partisans (Journal des sciences militaires, 59^{e}année, Paris 1883)
- Devaureix, capitaine, adjudant-major au 135^{e} régiment d'infanterie; De la guerre des partisans, sonpassé, son avenir (Journal des sciences militaires, Paris, décembre 1880)
- Isidor Didion (1798–1878), French general, author of classical writings on Ballistics
- Wilhelm Dilich (1571–1650), also military writer
- Dionysius of Halicarnassus (died after 7 BC), author of the Roman Antiquities
- Maximilian von Ditfurth (1806–1861), Electorate of Hesse officer and military historian
- Aubrey C. Dixon, British officer, military writer
- Ernst von Dohnányi, US military writer (pseudonym)
- Chris Donnelly (born 1946), British military scientist and intelligence officer working in NATO, author of Red Banner. Soviet Military System in Peace and War (1989)
- Giulio Douhet (1869–1930), Italian general and theorist of Air Warfare; treatise Luftherrschaft („Il Dominio dell'Aria“)
- Lev Dovator (1903–1941), cavalry operations theorist
- Mikhail Ivanovich Dragomirov (1830–1905), the most famous military theorist in Russia; Sketches of the Austro-Prussian War of 1866 Очерки австро-прусской войны 1866 г. (1867); Textbook of Tactics Учебник тактики (1872); An Attempt at a Guide for Preparing Units for Battle Опыт руководства для подготовки частей к бою (1885–1886); Soldier’s Handbook Солдатская памятка (1890) and many other publications in collections and journals
- M. A. Drobow, Soviet military writer; Малая война партизанство и диверсии / Malaja vojna partizanstvo i diversii (Small war, guerrilla warfare, and sabotage, Moscow 1931)
- Nikolai Dubrovin (1837–1904), Russian historian, academician and lieutenant general: History of the War and the Rule of the Russians in the Caucasus (6 vols., St. Petersburg 1871–1888), among others
- Manuel Duero, Marqués del (1808–1874), Spanish military; Táctica de infanteria: instrucción de guerrillas (Departmentósito de la Guerra, Madrid 1864)
- Guillaume Henri Dufour (1787–1875), general; Cours de tactique (Paris, 1851)
- Pierre Dupont de l'Étang (1765–1840), French general during the French Revolution, under Napoleon and the restored monarchy, L'Art de la guerre, poème en dix chants. Paris, Firmin Didot Frères, 1838 (Digital copy)
- Louis Durat-Lasalle (capitaine (1813–1848), dates unknown) French military writer, author of Code de l'Officier

=== E ===
- Edward Mead Earle (1894–1954): Makers of Modern Strategy: Military Thought from Machiavelli to Hitler, ed. (1943) (Digital copy, 1952 edition)
- Henry E. Eccles (1898–1986): Military Concepts and Philosophy (1965)
- Franz von Edelsheim (1868–?), officer, military writer; Operationen über See. Eine Studie, von Freiherr von Edelsheim, Oberleutnant im 2. Garde-Ulanen-Regiment, commandirt zur Dienstleistung im Grossen Generalstabe (Verlag von R. Eisenschmidt, Berlin 1901)
- Arthur Ehrhardt (1896–1971), officer, military writer; Der Kleinkrieg. Geschichtliche Erfahrungen und künftige Möglichkeiten. Potsdam 1935, 2nd ed., 1942, 3rd ed. 1944. American edition: Guerrilla Warfare. Lessons of the Past and Possibilities of the Future. Fort Leavenworth, KA 1936 (Command and General Staff School); see also Graue Bücherei
- Robert Petrovich Eideman (Roberts Eidemanis) (1895–1937), Soviet military writer, editor of Soviet Military Encyclopedia (1932)
- Jacques Ellul (1912–1994), French philosopher and sociologist; Propagandes (1962)
- Andreas Emmerich (1737–1809); Der Partheygänger im Kriege oder der Nutzen eines Corps leichter Truppen für eine Armee, 1789 (English: The Partisan in War)
- Tom Engelhardt (born 1944), American critic of US security and military policy
- Friedrich Engels (1820–1895), socialist politician, military writer, Karl Marx's lifelong friend („Kann Europa abrüsten?“)
- Enver Bey / Enver Pascha (1881–1922), Ottoman general, military writer
- Waldemar Erfurth (1879–1971), German military historian, strategist, and officer in three German armies; Die Überraschung im Kriege (Surprise in War; 1938)
- Ludwig von Eimannsberger (1878–1945), Austrian general; The Tank Warfare (Munich 1934)
- Ernst von Eisenhart-Rothe (1862–1947), German infantry general in World War I, Quartermaster General, 1917–1918 General Intendant of the Field Army, lieutenant general, military writer
- Alonso de Ercilla y Zúñiga (1533–1594), author of La Araucana
- Bernardino de Escalante (c. 1537–after 1605), Spanish military theorist, Diálogos del arte militar (Seville, 1583)
- Francisco Espoz y Mina (1781–1836), Spanish guerrilla leader and general; A Short Extract from the Life of General Mina (1825)
- Eutropius (4th century), Roman historian, Breviarium ab urbe condita
- Johann von Ewald (1744–1813), German army officer from Hesse-Kassel; Essay on Partisan Warfare (German: Abhandlung über den kleinen Krieg, Cassel 1785)

=== F ===
- Georg Rudolph Fäsch (1710–1787), Saxon military officer and war historian
- Erich von Falkenhayn (1861–1922), general
- Eugen Farrell, officer, military writer
- Byron Farwell (1921–1999), military historian; Queen Victoria´s little wars (New York 1972)
- Dieter Farwick (born 1940), German brigadier general and military writer; Kleinkriege, die unterschätzte Kriegsform. Warum die Zukunft von Kriegen den Guerillas, Partisanen und Hackern gehört, Bad Schussenried (Gerhard Hess Verlag) o. J. (2016)
- Ildefonse Favé (1812–1894), military writer, former adjutant to Emperor Napoleon III and later brigadier general
- Hans von Felgenhauer (1863–1946), royal Prussian major general, military writer and poet
- David M. Finkelstein, American historian, specializing in China (uscc.gov)
- Flavius Vegetius Renatus (late 4th century), war theorist and author of a main work of ancient military science: Epitoma rei militaris
- Florus, Roman historian, author of a short history of Rome
- Ferdinand Foch (1851–1929): Les principes de la guerre („The Principles of War“, 1903)
- Jean-Charles Chevalier de Folard (1669–1752), French officer and military theorist, author of Commentaires sur l'Histoire de Polybe (Amsterdam 1735, 7 vols.); Traité de la guerre de partisans (unpublished)
- Theodor Fontane (1819–1898), also military writer
- Curt von François (1852–1931), officer, military writer
- Hans Frank (1939–2019), German vice admiral, president of the Federal Academy for Security Policy (Bundesakademie für Sicherheitspolitik, BAKS), military author
- Hermann Franke (1878–1956), German officer; editor of Handbuch der neuzeitlichen Wehrwissenschaften (Walter de Gruyter & Co in Berlin und Leipzig)
- T. H. C. Frankland (1879-1915), Major, military writer; Notes on Guerilla Warfare (The United Service Magazine, New Series, vol. 33)
- Hugo von Freytag-Loringhoven (1855–1924), Prussian infantry general and military writer; Die Macht der Persönlichkeit im Kriege. Studien nach Clausewitz (The Power of Personality in War. Studies after Clausewitz, 1905)
- Frederick the Great (1712–1786), military theorist; Militärische Schriften
- Eugen Friese (19th century), officer, military writer; Braucht Deutschland eine Colonial-Armee? Dresden o.J. [1887] (3rd ed. 1887).
- Leonhard Fronsperger (1520–1575): Von Kayserlichem Kriegßrechten (On Imperial War Rights). The most important German military writer of the 16th century, addressing warfare of his time
- Sextus Iulius Frontinus (≈35–103), author of Strategemata
- Mikhail Vasilyevich Frunze (1885–1925), Soviet army leader during the Russian Civil War; Yedinaya voyennaya doktrina i krasnaya armiya (A Unified Military Doctrine and the Red Army) (1921); Front i tyl v voyne budushchego (The Front and the Rear in Future Warfare) (1925)
- Christopher J. Fuller, historian; See It/Shoot It: The Secret History of the CIA's Lethal Drone Program (2017)
- J. F. C. Fuller (1878–1966), British general, military writer, theorist of Armored Warfare

=== G ===
- Joseph Gallieni (1849–1916), French general, governor of Madagascar and war minister: The Pacification of Madagascar; Madagascar de 1896 à 1905 (Tananarive 1905)
- Karl Galster (1851–1931), German vice admiral, critic of the Tirpitz naval buildup
- David Galula (1919–1966), French officer, military writer
- Daniele Ganser (born 1972), Swiss historian and publicist, publications on NATO secret armies in Europe and military actions of NATO states
- Makhmut Gareev (1923–2019), Russian general, Deputy Chief of the General Staff of the Soviet Armed Force, president of the Russian Academy of Military Sciences; If War Comes Tomorrow? The Contours of Future Armed Conflict (1998)
- Azar Gat (born 1959), Israeli military historian and theorist; The Development of Military Thought: The Nineteenth Century (Clarendon Press: Oxford, 1992)

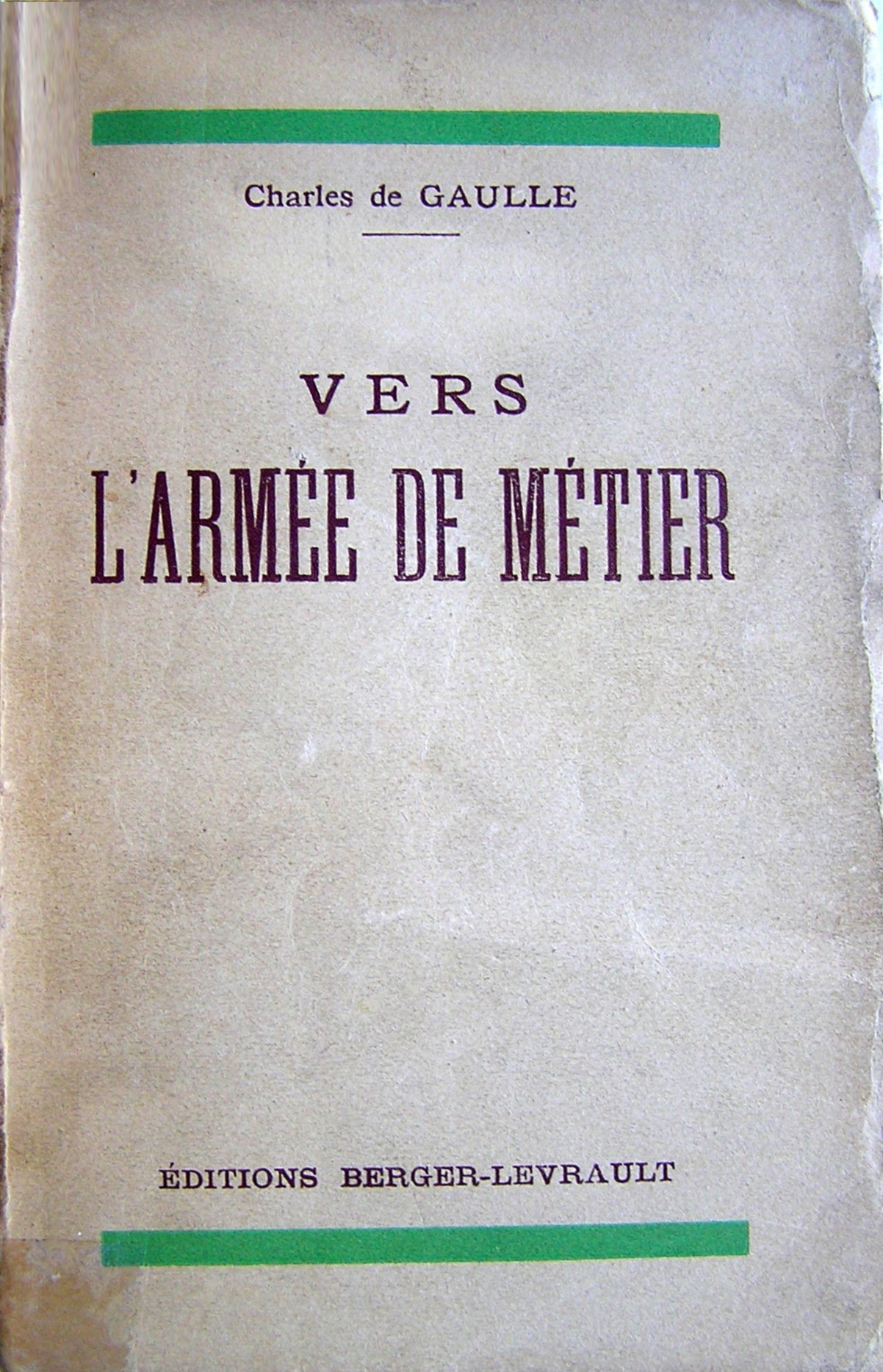
Charles de Gaulle: Vers l'armée de métier (1934)

- Charles de Gaulle (1890–1970), French general and statesman; La France et son armée (1938 – theory of armored warfare); Vers l'armée de métier (1934)
- Gazurelli, Italian officer, military writer
- Valery Gerasimov (born 1955), Russian army general, serving as the Chief of the General Staff of the Russian Armed Forces and First Deputy Minister of Defence; Tsennost' nauki v predvidenii Ценность науки в предвидении (The Value of Science is in the Foresight) in Voenno-Promyshlennyi Kurier (Military-Industrial Courier) 2013
- F. Gershelman Фёдор Константинович Гершельман (1853–1927), Partisanskaia voina Партизанская война (St. Petersburg 1885)
- Dan Gettinger, military author, drone expert; Unmanned Combat Aerial Vehicles: Current Types, Ordnance and Operations (Wien 2021); The Drone Databook
- Robert Ginsberg (born 1937): The Critique of War: Contemporary Philosophical Explorations (1969), ed.
- Nikolai Nikolayevich Golovin (1875–1944), Russian military leader, military historian, and theorist; Air strategy (1936)
- Colmar Freiherr von der Goltz (1843–1916), 19th century general and theorist of warfare
- Sergey Georgyevich Gorshkov (1910–1988), Soviet fleet admiral and naval strategist
- Leonid Govorov (1897–1955), Soviet military commander, Marshal of the Soviet Union, practitioner of combined arms strategy during World War II
- Thomas-Antoine le Roy de Grandmaison (1715-1801), officier; La Petite Guerre, ou traité du service des troupes légères en campagne (s.l., s.p. 1756)
- Lester W. Grau, American military historian, The Bear Went over the Mountain: Soviet Combat Tactics in Afghanistan (1996)
- Todd Greentree; author of Crossroads of Intervention: Insurgency and Counterinsurgency Lessons from Central America (Westport, CT: Praeger Security International, 2008)
- Heinz Greiner (1895–1977), general, military writer
- Samuel B. Griffith (1906–1983), US Marine Corps brigadier general and military historian
- Georgios Grivas(-Dighenis) (1898–1974), Greek officer, military writer; Guerrilla Warfare and EOKA's Struggle: A Politicomilitary Study
- Georg Dietrich von der Groeben (1725–1794), Prussian lieutenant general and military writer, Krieges-Bibliothek oder gesammlete Beyträge zur Krieges-Wissenschaft (War Library or Collected Contributions to the Science of War) and continuation Neue Kriegsbibliothek (New War Library)
- Otto Friedrich von der Groeben (1657–1728), Brandenburg-Prussia explorer, officer; Die erste deutsche Kolonie wird gegründet (The first German colony is founded)
- Erich Gröner (1901–1965), German naval author, author of standard works on German warships since 1815
- Otto Groos (1882–1970), German admiral, military historian, author and lecturer on naval warfare
- Heinz Guderian (1888–1954), German general, military writer, executor of the Blitzkrieg, author of Achtung – Panzer!
- Bruce I. Gudmundsson (born 1959), Danish-US-American military historian

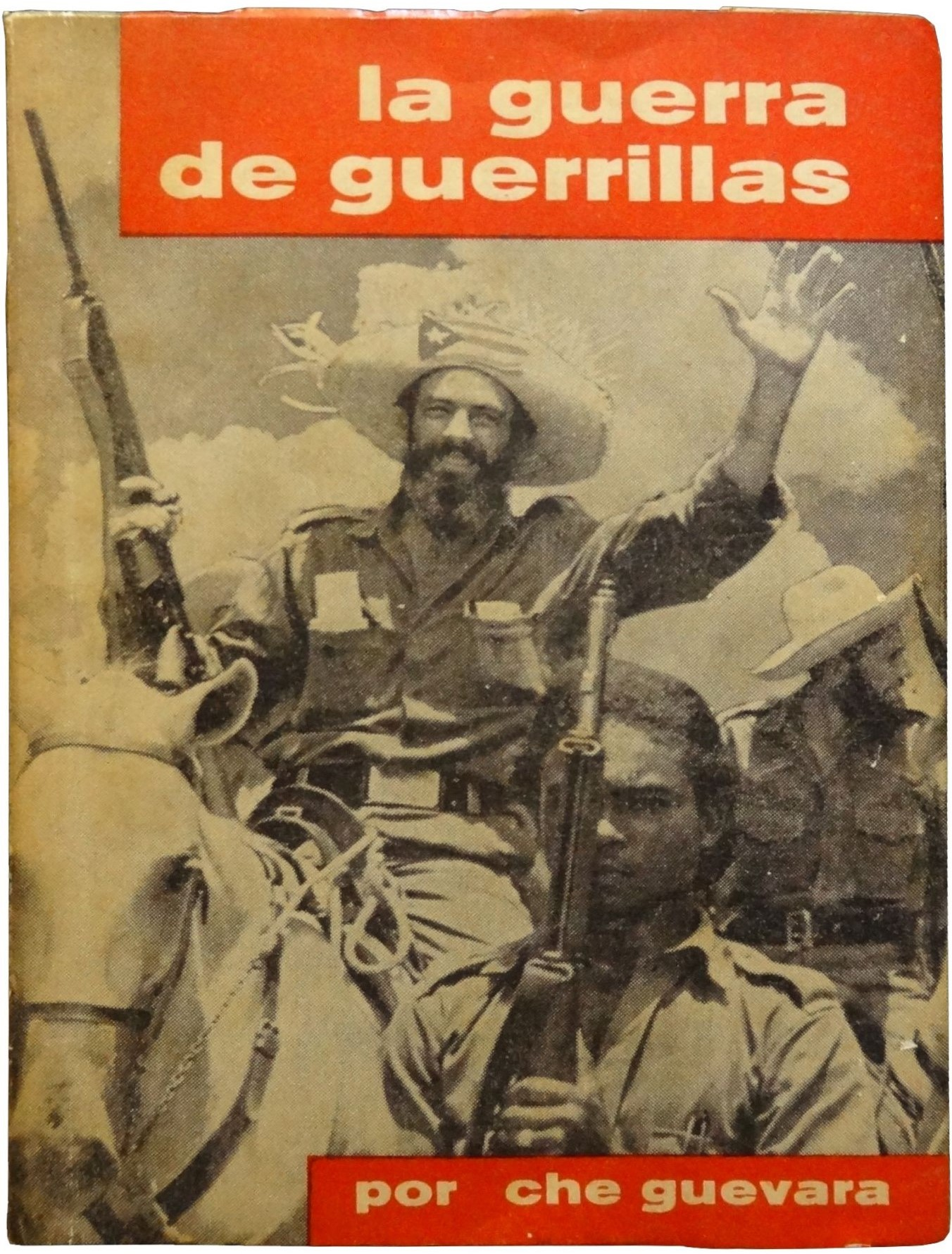
Che Guevara: Guerrilla Warfare (La Guerra de Guerrillas, edition of 1961)

- Ernesto Che Guevara (1928–1967), Argentine revolutionary, whose diary depicts the fighting in Bolivia (Bolivian Diary); author of Guerrilla Warfare (La Guerra de Guerrillas)
- Jacques Antoine Hippolyte Guibert (1743–1790), general and military writer
- Karl Theophil Guichard (1724–1775), Prussian officer and military writer, confidant of Frederick the Great
- Abraham Guillén (1913–1993), Spanish author, economist, and political theorist, developed a theory of urban guerrilla warfare; Philosophy of the Urban Guerrilla
- Guo Rugui 郭汝瑰 (1907–1997): Chinese Military History 中国军事史, 1980s (ed.)

=== H ===
- Robert Habermaas (1856–1921), major general and military writer
- David P. Hadley, American historian; The Rising Clamor: The American Press, the Central Intelligence Agency, and the Cold War (Lexington, Kentucky 2019)
- Hans von Haeften (de) (1870–1937), general, military writer; Eine deutsche Kolonialarmee (1905)
- Werner Hahlweg (1912–1989), military historian; Typologie des modernen Kleinkriegs (1967); Guerilla - Krieg ohne Fronten (Kohlhammer, Stuttgart 1968); Lehrmeister des Kleinen Krieges. Von Clausewitz bis Mao Tse-tung (1968)
- Morton Halperin (born 1938): Contemporary Military Strategy (1967)
- Muhammad Hamidullah (1908–2002): The Battlefields of Prophet Muhammad (Woking, England, 1953)
- Edward Bruce Hamley (1824–1893), British general and military writer; The Operations of War (1866)
- Samuel M. Harrington (1882–1948), officer of the United States Marine Corps with the rank of brigadier general, The Strategy and Tactics of Small Wars (1921)
- Georg Hartmann (1865–1946), military writer; Der Krieg in Südafrika und seine Lehren für Deutsch-Südwestafrika (Berlin 1900)
- Karl Haushofer (1869–1946), officer, university lecturer, military writer
- Otto Heilbrunn (1906–1969), German-British lawyer, military writer
- Herodian (died c. 250), author of History of the Empire after Marcus Aurelius
- Herodot (died c. 430/20 BC), ancient Greek historian, author of the Histories
- Alexander Vladimirovich Heroys (ru) (1870–1944); Russian military, Lieutenant General (1917); (with Léon Thévenin) L'Armée rouge et la guerre sociale (Paris 1931)
- Beatrice Heuser (born 1961), historian and political scientist: Rebellen – Partisanen – Guerilleros. Asymmetrische Kriege von der Antike bis heute (Paderborn u.a. 2013); The Strategy Makers: Thoughts on War and Society from Machiavelli to Clausewitz (Greenwood/Praeger, Santa Monica, CA 2010)
- Friedrich August Freiherr von der Heydte (1907–1994), officer, military writer; Der moderne Kleinkrieg als wehrpolitisches und militärisches Phänomen (Würzburg 1972)
- Hellmuth Heye (1895–1970), German vice admiral, Ombudsman for the Military (Wehrbeauftragter), and military writer
- Hans H. Hildebrand (de) (1919–2011), German naval officer and historian (with Albert Röhr and Hans-Otto Steinmetz): Die deutschen Kriegsschiffe: Biographien: ein Spiegel der Marinegeschichte von 1815 bis zur Gegenwart (seven vols., in several editions since 1979)
- Franz Hinterstoisser (1863–1933), Austrian aeronaut and military writer
- Alexander Ivanovich Hippius (1855 – around 1918), officer of the Imperial Russian Army, Military Governor of the Fergana Region (1911–1916); military writer; A Century of the Ministry of War, 1802–1902. General Staff. Historical Overview. Troop Training Столетие военного министерства. 1802—1902. Главный штаб. Исторический очерк. Образование (обучение) войск (St. Petersburg, 1903); On the Causes of Our War with Japan О причинах нашей войны с Японией (St. Petersburg 1905)
- Jochen Hippler (de) (born 1955), German political scientist; Counterinsurgency – Theorien unkonventioneller Kriegführung: Callwell, Thompson, Smith und das US Army Field Manual 3-24 (in: Thomas Jäger/Rasmus Beckmann (Hg.): Handbuch Kriegstheorien, Wiesbaden 2011, S. 256-28)
- Jaromir Hirtenfeld, originally Csikos (1816–1872), Austro-Hungarian military writer, owner and editor-in-chief of the Militär-Zeitung
- Hồ Chí Minh (1890–1969), Vietnamese revolutionary and communist politician (The Armed Uprising, etc.)
- Hoàng Văn Thái (1915–1986), Vietnamese Army General and communist politician; Some aspects of guerrilla warfare in Viet Nam (Hanoi, 1965)
- Thomas Hobbes (1588–1679), English philosopher; Leviathan
- Frederick Benjamin „Ben“ Hodges (born 1958), US military officer (Center for European Policy Analysis)
- Max Hoelz (1889–1933), German Communist and author; Vom „Weißen Kreuz“ zur roten Fahne. Jugend-, Kampf- und Zuchthauserlebnisse (Malik-Verlag, Berlin 1929)
- Franz Conrad von Hötzendorf (1852–1925), Chief of the General Staff of the entire armed forces of Austria-Hungary at the start of World War I, Field Marshal since 1916
- Kraft zu Hohenlohe-Ingelfingen (1827–1892), prince, general of artillery and military writer, Pour le Mérite; Strategische Briefe (Strategic Letters)
- Albert von Holleben (1835–1906), Prussian infantry general and military writer, appointed Governor of Mainz in 1893
- Richard Holmes (1946–2011), British military historian; Editor-in-Chief (with others) of the Oxford Companion to Military History
- Albert Hopman (1865–1942), German vice admiral and military writer
- Karl Hron (1852–1912); Der Parteigänger-Krieg (Seidel & Sohn, Wien 1885)
- Walter Hülsen (1863–1947), general, military writer
- Abel Hugo (1798–1855), France militaire: histoire des armées françaises de terre et de mer de 1792 à 1837. 1838 (5 vols.)

=== I ===
- Virgilio Ilari (born 1948), Italian historian and strategist
- Friedrich Immanuel (1857–1939), German colonel, military writer, Reich Warriors’ League Kyffhäuser
- Georgii Isserson Георгий Иссерсон (1898–1976), Soviet general and military theorist, operational art, mechanized deep operations; Evolyutsiya operativnogo iskusstva Эволюция оперативного искусства (1932 and 2nd enlarged ed. 1937; The Evolution of Operational Art, Combat Studies Institute Press, Fort Leavenworth, Kansas, 2013) and Lektsii po glubokoy taktike Лекции по глубокой тактике (The Fundamentals of the Deep Operation, 1933); Novye formy bor’by: Opyt issledovaniia sovremennykh voin Новые формы борьбы: Опыт исследования современных войн (New Forms of Combat: An Essay Researching Modern Wars) (1940); Key Writings

=== J ===
- Thomas Jäger (de) (born 1960), German political scientist; (with Rasmus Beckmann, eds.): Handbuch Kriegstheorien (Wiesbaden 2011 - content)
- Max Jähns (1837–1900), Prussian officer and military writer; Geschichte der Kriegswissenschaften, vornehmlich in Deutschland (3 volumes, München/Leipzig 1889–1891)
- Rudolf August von Janson (1844–1917), Prussian officer, infantry general and military writer
- Louis Michel de Jeney (Mihaly Lajos Jeney) (1723 or 1724–1797): Le partisan ou l'art de faire la petite-guerre avec succès selon le génie de nos jours détaillé sur des plans propres à faciliter l'intelligence des dispositions (Constapel, La Haye 1759)
- John VII the Middle of Nassau-Siegen (1561–1623), military career, Verteidigungsbuch für die Grafschaft Nassau (Defense Book for the County of Nassau)
- Michael Johns (born 1964), writer, foreign policy and security expert
- R. F. Johnson, Capt.; Night attacks: a treatise on nocturnal tactics (London, 1886)
- Antoine-Henri Jomini (1779–1869), baron, Swiss officer and military theorist, author of works on the Napoleonic Wars, including Traité de grande tactique, ou, Relation de la guerre de sept ans, extraite de Tempelhof, commentée at comparée aux principales opérations de la derniére guerre; avec un recueil des maximes les plus important de l'art militaire, justifiées par ces différents évenéments (Paris: Giguet et Michaud, 1805. In English translation as: Jomini, Antoine-Henri, trans. Col. S.B. Holabird, U.S.A. Treatise on Grand Military Operations: or A Critical and Military History of the Wars of Frederick the Great as Contrasted with the Modern System, 2 vols. New York: D. van Nostrand, 1865); Précis de l’Art de la Guerre (Summary of the Art of War) and Traité des grandes opérations militaires (Treatise on Major Military Operations)
- Charles-André Julien (1891–1991), French historian who opposed French colonialism; Les techniciens de la colonisation: XIXe-XXe siècles
- Wolfgang Jung (de) (1938–2024), German peace activist, publications on drone strikes controlled via Ramstein Air Base (www.luftpost-kl.de)
- Justinus (Justin), Roman historian

=== K ===
- Akhil Kadidal, military aviation journalist (swarm UAV)
- Zachary Kallenborn, author and analyst, specialized in WMD terrorism, unmanned systems, drone swarms; Are drone swarms weapons of mass destruction? (2020)
- Ghanshyam Singh Katoch, Lt. Gen., Indian military; Fourth Generation War: Paradigm For Change (June, 2005. Masters Thesis submitted at the Naval Postgraduate School, Monterey, California)

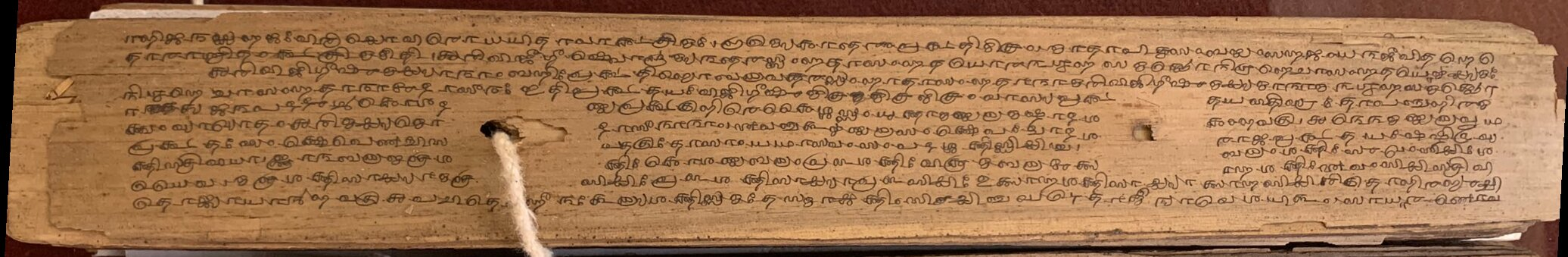
Arthashastra (16th century manuscript in Grantha script kept at the Oriental Research Institute, Mysore)

- Kautilya's Arthashastra, see under Chanakya
- Hugo Kerchnawe (1872–1949), Austrian major general and military historian
- Kimberly Ellen Kagan (born 1972), American military historian, heads the Institute for the Study of War
- Nikolai Vasilievich Kaulbars (ru), Baron (1842–1905), general of the Russian army and military writer
- Franz Georg Friedrich von Kausler (1794–1848): Napoleon’s Principles, Views and Statements on the Art of War, Military History and Warfare. Compiled from his Works and Correspondence. Leipzig, Baumgärtner 1827. Influential military writer for officer training of his time. Appointed member of the Royal Swedish Military Academy in Stockholm.
- Hugo Kerchnawe (1872–1949), Austrian general and military writer
- Anton Antonovich Kersnovsky (ru) (1907-1944), Russian military historian; Philosophy of War Философия войны (1932–1939); History of the Russian Army История Русской Армии (1933–1938, 4 vols.)
- John Keegan (1934–2012), military historian
- Egbert Broer Kielstra (1844–1920), Dutch KNIL officer, politician, and administrator; Beschrijving van den Atjeh-oorlog met gebruikmaking der officieele bronnen door het Departement van Koloniën, 3 parts (Van Cleef, Den Haag 1883, 1884, 1885)
- Jacob W. Kipp (1942-2021), US military historian, director of FMSO; publications on Russian and Soviet naval and military history; ‘Smart’ Defense From New Threats: Future War From a Russian Perspective: Back to the Future After the War on Terror (The Journal of Slavic Military Studies, 2014)
- Henry Kissinger (1923–2023), US Secretary of State, nuclear war theorist; The Necessity for Choice: Prospects of American Foreign Policy (1961)
- Johannes Kladusch, military historian; Der kleine Krieg. Studien zum Heerwesen des Absolutismus (Wiesbaden 1973)
- Ian Knight (born 1956), British historian and writer; (with Richard Scollins): Queen Victoria´s Enemies 2: Northern Africa (London 1989), and other books in the series Men-at-Arms
- J. H. B. Köhler (1818–1873), Dutch officer, military writer; Eene nalezing van feiten tijdens de eerste expeditie tegen het rijk van Atjeh; naar aanleiding van het werk: Beschrijving van den Atjeh-Oorlog door E. B. Kielstra; met een aanhangsel (Rotterdam 1884)
- Andrei Kokoshin (born 1945); Soviet and Russian statesman, political scientist and historian, Americanist; Serye kardinaly Belogo doma Серые кардиналы Белого дома (Grey Cardinals of the White House; 1986), SDI (1988)
- Nikolai Vladimirovich Kolesnikov (ru) (1882–1937), Russian officer, colonel of the General Staff, military writer – author of books on the theory and practice of warfare as well as on military-historical subjects
- Ivan Konev (1879–1973), Soviet general and Marshal of the Soviet Union, large-scale maneuver, WWII operations; Sorok pjatyj Сорок пятый (1966); Zapiski komandujuščego frontom Записки командующего фронтом (1972)
- Hans Krech (de) (born 1956), German historian; Die Kampfhandlungen in den ehemaligen deutschen Kolonien in Afrika während des 1. Weltkrieges (1914-1918) (Berlin 1999); Asymmetrische Konflikte, eine existenzielle Herausforderung für die NATO (Bremen 2008)
- Harald Kujat (born 1942), German general; Europa bewahren (Preserving Europe), etc.
- Dominika Kunertova, research analyst, drone warfare expert; Learning from the Ukrainian Battlefield: Tomorrow’s Drone Warfare, Today’s Innovation Challenge (ETH Zürich 2024)
- Alexander Ivanovich Kuzmin Александр Иванович Кузьмин, Russian military historian, director of the A. V. Suvorov State Memorial Museum in Saint Petersburg; contribution to Diary of N. A. Gryazev ‘My Journal’. Swiss Campaign of 1799 (Дневник Н.А. Грязева «Мой журнал». Швейцарский поход 1799 года. 2013)
- Vladimir Kvachkov (born 1948), Russian former Spetsnaz colonel, military intelligence officer and writer; Development of means and methods of special intelligence in the modern warfare (Развитие форм боевого применения сил и средств специальной разведки в современных условиях)
- Konrad Kyeser (1366–after 1405), Bellifortis

=== L ===
- Henry Lachouque (1883–1971), French officer and historian; Napoleon’s Battles (London, 1966)
- Jean-Gérard Lacuée, count of Cessac (1752–1841), French general, minister of war and governor of the École polytechnique
- Andrew Lambert (born 1956), British naval historian
- Landry (14th century), French author; Le chevalier de La Tour et le Guidon des guerres
- Alfred Langer (collective pseudonym; Tuure Lehén (1893–1976)); Der Weg zum Sieg. Die Kunst des bewaffneten Aufstandes (Berlin 1928)
- Lester D. Langley (1940–2025), American historian, author of books about the relationship of the United States with Latin America and the Caribbean; The Banana Wars. United States Intervention in the Caribbean, 1898-1934 (Lexington, KY 1985); with Thomas Schoonover (1936–2023): The Banana Men: American Mercenaries and Entrepreneurs in Central America, 1880-1930 (Lexington, KY 1995)
- Werner von Langsdorff (pseudonym Thor Goote) (1899–1940), German writer (Nazi Movement); Deutsche Flagge über Sand und Palmen. 53 Kolonialkrieger erzählen (German Flag over Sand and Palms. 53 colonial warriors tell their stories). Mit Geleitworten v. General P. v. Lettow-Vorbeck und Reichsstatthalter Ritter v. Epp (Bertelsmann, Gütersloh 1936)
- A. N. Lapchinsky (ru) (1882–1938), Head of Aviation Tactics department, Frunze Military Academy; Vozdushnaia armiia Военная мысль (Military Thought) (Gosvoenizdat, Moscow 1939)
- Walter Laqueur (1921–2018), German-born American historian; The Guerrilla Reader A Historical Anthology (Philadelphia, 1977); Guerrilla Warfare. A Historical and Critical Study (5th ed., New Brunswick, NJ 2006)
- La Roche-Aymon (1772–1849), Prussian-French general
- Jean Lartéguy (1920–2011), French officer, writer; Les Centurions (1960)

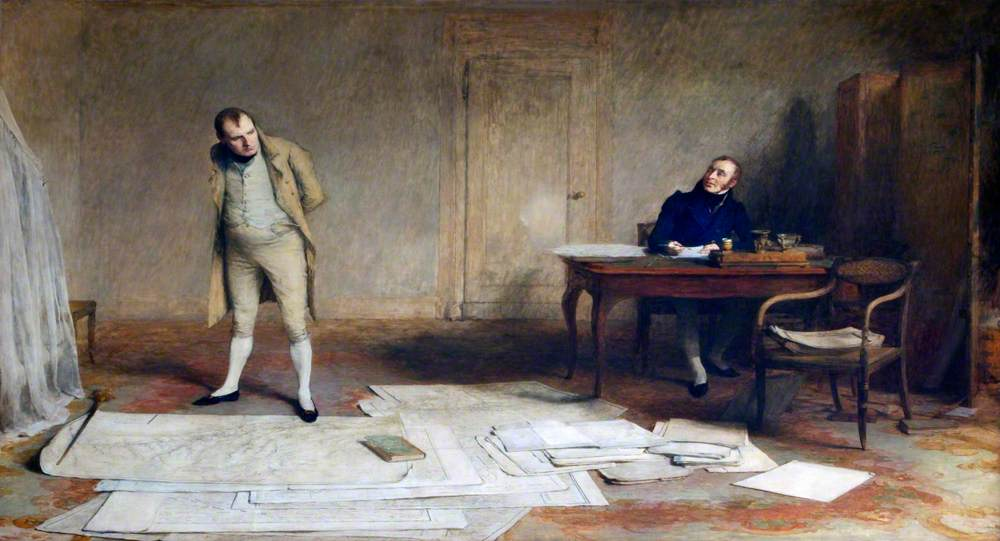
St Helena, 1816: Napoleon Dictating to Count Las Cases the Account of His Campaigns (1892), by the artist William Quiller Orchardson (1832–1910)

- Emmanuel, comte de Las Cases (1766–1842), French atlas-maker and author of a book about Napoleon, Le Mémorial de Sainte-Hélène (The Memorial of Saint Helena)
- Thomas Edward Lawrence, aka Lawrence of Arabia (1888–1935), British officer, archaeologist, intelligence agent, and writer
- Guillaume Le Blond (1704–1781), mathematician and military theorist, also worked on fortifications
- Frank Ledwidge, British lawyer, military historian, Royal Air Force College Cranwell
- Robert E. Lee (1807–1870), US officer, Confederate general
- Wilhelm Ritter von Leeb (1876–1956); Die Abwehr (1938)
- Heinrich Antonowitsch Leer (1829–1904), Russian military scientist and general, editor of Encyclopedia of Military and Naval Sciences
- Jean Frédéric Auguste Lemière de Corvey (1832–1771), officer, military writer; Des partisans et des corps irréguliers, ou manière d'employer avec avantage les troupes-légère ... Paris 1828 (Digital copy)
- Bernd Lemke (born 1965), military historian
- Vladimir Lenin (1870–1924), Guerrilla warfare (1906)
- Leo VI (866–912), Byzantine emperor; Summary Treatise on the Art of War
- Robert R. Leonhard, military theorist; The Art of Maneuver: Maneuver Warfare Theory and Airland Battle
- Hans Oskar von Lettow-Vorbeck (1839–1904), Leitfaden für den Unterricht in der Taktik an den Königlichen Kriegsschulen. Auf Befehl der General-Inspektion des Militär-Erziehungs- und Bildungs-Wesens ausgearbeitet von von Lettow-Vorbeck Guide for Tactical Instruction at Royal War Schools, Berlin, 1888)
- Paul von Lettow-Vorbeck (1870–1964), general, military writer
- Theodor Leutwein (1849–1921), German military officer and colonial administrator; autobiography, Elf Jahre als Gouverneur in Deutsch-Südwestafrika (Berlin 1906; Eleven Years as Governor in German South West Africa), an historical account of his career in German Southwest Africa; Die Kämpfe der Kaiserlichen Schutztruppe in Deutsch-Südwestafrika in den Jahren 1894-96, sowie die sich hieraus für uns ergebenden Lehren (Berlin 1898)
- Martin Lezius (1884–1941), German military writer, editor of Zeitschrift für Heereskunde
- Lee Yu-Ri (1908–1955), Chinese military scientist and writer, editor of Zhongguo bingxue daxi 中國兵學大系
- Basil H. Liddell Hart (1895–1970), British officer, military writer; proponent of the indirect approach; Strategy: The Indirect Approach
- Peter Lieb (born 1974), military historian
- Francis Lieber (1800–1872), Guerrilla parties: considered with reference to the laws and usages of war (1862)
- Hermann von der Lieth-Thomsen (1867–1942), German general and air warfare expert
- Johann Jakob Otto August Rühle von Lilienstern (1780–1847), Prussian lieutenant general and military writer
- Otto Liman, officer, military writer
- Lin Biao 林彪 (1907–1971), Chinese politician and strategist, strategy of encircling the cities of the world with the rural areas 农村包围城市 (by Mao Zedong); Long Live the Victory of People’s War! / Renmin zhanzheng shengli wansui! 人民战争胜利万岁 (Renmin Ribao, 3 September 1965)
- Lin Xunnan 林薰南 (1890–1982), Chinese general and military writer, editor of Bingxue luncong (1943)
- Julian Lindley-French (born 1958), British military historian
- Justus Lipsius (1547–1606), Flemish scholar, military writings
- Liu Lumin 刘鲁民 (born 1920), former deputy chief of logistics of the PLA, editor of Zhongguo bingshu jicheng 中国兵书集成
- Henry Lloyd (d. 1783), Welsh officer and military writer, Military Memoirs
- Heinrich von Löbell (de) (1816–1901); German military and military writer; (ed.) V[on] Löbell's Jahresberichte über die Veränderungen und Fortschritte im Militärwesen; Von Löbell's Jahresberichte über das Heer- und Kriegswesen
- Robert Lo-Looz (1728–1786), French officer and tactician
- Max Looff (1874–1954), German admiral and military writer
- Franc̦ois de Saillans-Bertrand de Loque, Protestant minister; author of Deux Traitéz: l'un de la guerre, l'autre du duel (Iacob Ratoyre, Lyon 1589)
- J. C. F. Lossau (1767–1848), Prussian general and war theorist; Der Krieg. Für wahre Krieger (1815)
- Woldemar Hermann von Löwenstern (1776–1858), Baltic officer in Russian service
- Louis Loyzeau de Grandmaison (1861–1915), French military theorist
- Ludwig XI. (attributed), Le Rosier des guerres
- Paul Lushenko (born 1982), U.S. Army strategist, drone warfare expert; (co-editor) Drones and Global Order: Implications of Remote Warfare for International Society (2021)
- Edward Luttwak (born 1942), theorist of the “dynamic paradox” of military strategy
- Jay Luvaas (1927–2009), US military historian, American Civil War expert
- Hubert Lyautey (1854–1934), Marshal of France, L'action coloniale (1900-1914): Madagascar - Sud-Oranais - Maroc (Digital copy - 1927)

=== M ===
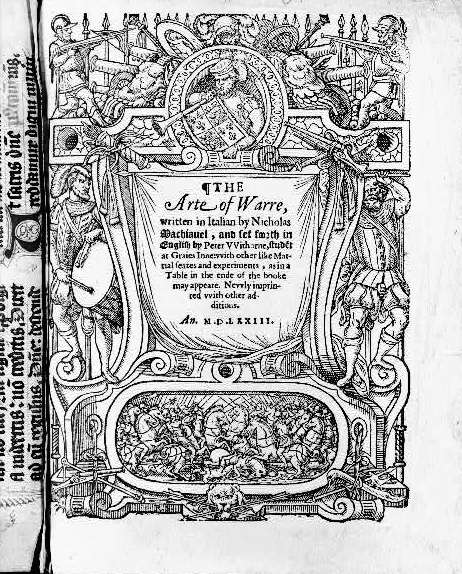
The Arte of Warre (Machiavelli): frontispiece of the English edition of Peter Withorne (London 1573)

- Niccolò Machiavelli (1469–1527), political thinker, author of The Prince and The Art of War
- Patrick MacDougall (1819–1894), British Army officer who became Commander of the British Troops in Canada; The Theory of War (1856), etc.
- Georg Maercker (1865–1924), German general, Freikorps leader, author; Unsere Schutztruppe in Ostafrika (Berlin 1893)
- T. Miller Maguire (1849–1920), British instructor, military historian; Guerilla or Partisan Warfare (1904); A Summary of Modern Military History, with Comments on the Leading Operations (1887); Outlines of Military Geography (1899); Our art of war as made in Germany (1900); Notes on the Outlines of Strategy (1902); Strategy and Tactics in Mountain Ranges (1904); General Von Clausewitz On War (1909)
- Alfred Thayer Mahan (1840–1914), maritime strategy, The Influence of Sea Power upon History
- Paul-Gédéon Joly de Maïzeroy (1719–1780), French officer and military theorist
- G. B. Malleson: Ambushes and Surprises: Being a Description of Some of the Most Famous Instances of the Leading Into Ambush and the Surprise of Armies, from the Time of Hannibal to the Period of the Indian Mutiny (London, 1885) (Digital copy)
- Jay Mallin (20th cent.), Cuba researcher; Strategy for conquest; Communist documents on guerrilla warfare (1971); Terror and Urban Guerrillas. A Study of Tactics and Documents (1971; 2nd ed. Coral Gables, FLA 1982)
- Curt von Maltzahn (1849–1930), German vice admiral and naval historian

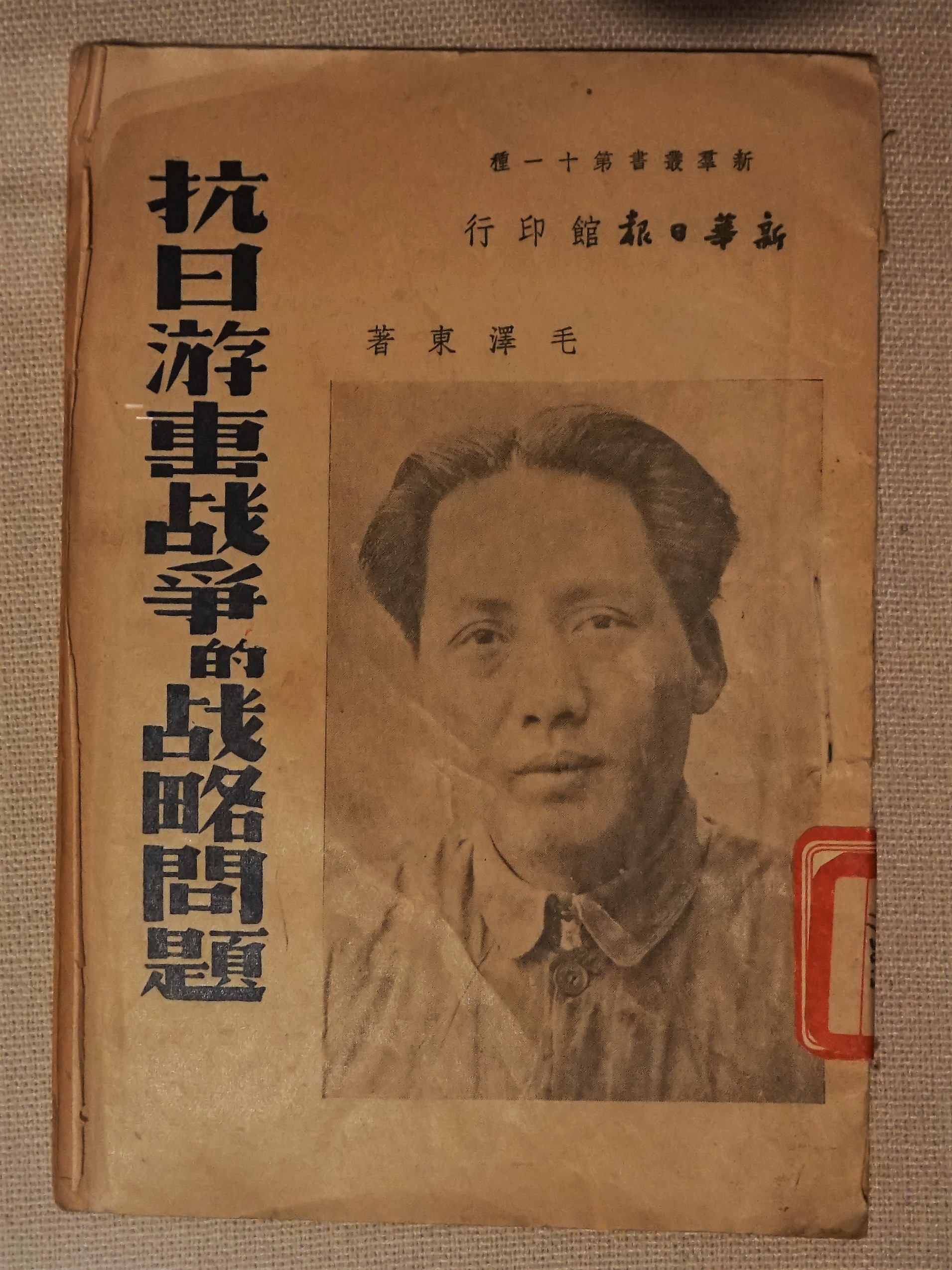
Mao Zedong: Problems of Strategy in Guerrilla War against Japan 抗日游击战争的战略问题 (1938)

- Mao Zedong (1893–1976), Chinese revolutionary leader, guerrilla theorist; The Struggle in the Chingkang Mountains 井冈山的斗争 (1928), On Guerrilla Warfare 抗日游击战争的一般问题 (1937), Problems of Strategy in Guerrilla War against Japan 抗日游击战争的战略问题 (1938); On Protracted War (speeches, 1938); Selected Military Writings (Digitali copy)
- Carlos Marighela (1911–1969), Brazilian urban guerrilla theorist; Minimanual of the Urban Guerrilla
- Andrew Marshall (1921–2019), American foreign policy strategist at the Office of Net Assessment (ONA) in the Department of Defense
- S. L. A. Marshall (1900–1977), US officer and military historian; Pork Chop Hill
- Marshall, George C. (1880–1959), US general, military writer
- A. R. Martin, Lieutenant-Colonel (1853–1926), British officer in the Indian Army; Mountain and Savage Warfare (Pioneer Press, Allahabad 1898)
- Tyrone G. Martin (born 1930), American constitutional scholar
- Karl Wilhelm Ritter von Martini (1821–1885), Austrian officer, military writer
- Karl Marx (1818–1883), German philosopher, political theorist, and revolutionary socialist, Friedrich Engels' lifelong friend
- Christian von Massenbach (1758–1827), military theorist
- Jason Matheny, president and CEO of RAND Corporation
- Flavius Mauritius Tiberius (539–602), Byzantine emperor, author of Strategikon
- Friedrich Wilhelm von Mauvillon (1774–1851), Prussian colonel
- Jakob Mauvillon (1743–1794), political economist and historian
- Giuseppe Mazzini (1805–1872), Italian nationalist and revolutionary who played a key role in the unification of Italy; Rules for the conduct of guerrilla bands (1832)
- Roger N. McDermott, specialist in Russian and Central Asian defence and security; The Russian Military Decision-Making Process & Automated Command and Control (German Institute for Defence and Strategic Studies, Hamburg 2020); Russia’s Path to the High-Tech Battlespace (The Jamestown Foundation, Washington, DC 2022)
- Nikolai von Medem Николай Васильевич Медем (1795–1870), German-Baltic Russian general and professor, founder of the national military strategy; Obozrenie izvestneyshikh pravil i sistem strategii Обозрение известнейших правил и систем стратегий (Review of the Most Renowned Rules and Systems of Strategy) (1836); Rukovodstvo k taktike Руководство к тактике (Guide to Tactics) (1837)
- Bernardino de Mendoza (1540–1604), Spanish diplomat, military theorist; Theórica y Práctica de Guerra (Madrid, 1595); Comentarios de lo sucedido en las Guerras de los Países Bajos (Rom 1592)
- Emanuel von Merta (1836–1899), Austrian general, military theorist
- H. F. Meijer (1832–1895), Dutch officer, military writer; Atjeh van 26 December 1875 tot 4 September 1876: De offensieve handelingen der gurilla. Uit officiëele bescheiden samengesteld (P. B. Nieuwenhuijs, Breda 1883)
- Gustav Meinecke (1854–1903), German editor and head of the Deutsche Kolonialzeitung, founded Deutscher Kolonial-Verlag, editor of Koloniales Jahrbuch
- Charles D. Melson, US military historian; chief historian of the Marine Corps; editor of Kleinkrieg. The German Experience with Guerrilla Warfare, from Clausewitz to Hitler (Haverton, PA 2016)
- Lodovico Melzo (1567–1617), Italian officer in Spanish service; Regole militari del cavalier Melzo sopra il governo e servitio della cavalleria (Military rules on the government and special service of the cavalry, 1611)
- Kirill Meretskov (1897–1968), Soviet military commander; winter War and WWII maneuver & logistics; Na službe narodu На службе народу (Serving the People) (1971)
- Albert Merglen (1915–2012), French general, military writer
- François-Jean de Mesnil-Durand (1736–1799), French tactician
- Evgeny Messner (Eugen Messner; 1891–1974), Russian soldier and military theorist; Mutiny, or the name of the Third World War (Мятеж — имя третьей всемирной, 1960)
- Karl H. Metz (born 1946), German historian; Der kleine Krieg im großen Krieg: Die Guerilla. Über eine Form politischer Gewalt, ihre Entstehung und ihren systematischen Zusammenhang (MGM, 33, 1983); Geschichte der Gewalt: Krieg, Revolution, Terror (201)
- Manus I. Midlarsky, On War: Political Violence in the International System (1975)
- Dmitry Milyutin (1816–1912), Russian military historian and politician, minister of war from 1861 to 1881; the last Russian general field marshal (1898); The history of Russia's war with France during the reign of Emperor Paul I in 1799 [История войны России с Францией в царствование Императора Павла I в 1799 году]. "Written by Imperial order of Sovereign Emperor Nicholas I". In five volumes. Saint Petersburg 1852–1853
- Billy Mitchell (1879–1936), US general; Winged Defense
- Helmuth Karl Bernhard von Moltke (1800–1891), Prussian field marshal, military writer
- Blaise de Monluc (1502–1577), French colonel general and marshal, author of Commentaires
- Arthur F. Montanaro, Lieut. Col. (1862–1914), British officer, military writer; Hints for a Bush Campaign (Sands Publishers, London 1901), German translation: Winke für Expeditionen im afrikanischen Busch. Mit Genehmigung des Verfassers aus dem Englischen übersetzt von Glauning, Hauptmann und Kompagniechef in der kaiserlichen Schutztruppe für Kamerun (Berlin 1905); (with Cecil Hamilton Armitage) The Ashanti Campaign of 1900 (London 1901)
- Raimondo Montecuccoli (1609–1680), Austrian general and military theorist; Aforismi dell'arte bellica (Aphorisms about the art of war)
- Max Montgelas (1860–1938), Bavarian general and diplomat; commission of Südwestafrikabericht (S.W.A.-Bericht) in 1908
- Robin Moore (1925–2008), American writer; The Hunt for Bin Laden: Task Force Dagger
- Henri Mordacq (1868–1943), French general, military writer
- Joseph Jean-Marie Mordrelle (fr) (1863–1942), French officer, military writer; Conférences sur la guerre coloniale, par le lieutenant-colonel Mordrelle, professées en 1908 à l'École supérieure de guerre (H. Charles-Lavauzelle, Paris 1910)
- Patrick M. Morgan, Deterrence: A Conceptual Analysis (1977)
- Curt Morgen (1858–1928), German explorer and officer; Kriegs- und Expeditionsführung in Afrika (1893)
- Moritz Graf von Sachsen (1696–1750), Marshal of France and military theorist; Mes Rêveries (My Reveries)
- Maurice, Prince of Orange (1567–1625), Prince of Orange
- Oleg Borissowitsch Mosochin (born 1956), Russian military historian, professor
- Johann Most (1846–1906), Revolutionäre Kriegswissenschaft: Eine Handbüchlein zur Anleitung Betreffend Gebrauches und Herstellung von Nitro-Glycerin, Dynamit, Schiessbaumwolle, Knallquecksilber, Bomben, Brandsätzen, Giften usw., usw. (The Science of Revolutionary Warfare: A Little Handbook of Instruction in the Use and Preparation of Nitroglycerine, Dynamite, Gun-Cotton, Fulminating Mercury, Bombs, Fuses, Poisons, Etc., Etc.) (New York: Internationaler Zeitung-Verein, c. 1883)
- Karl von Müffling genannt Weiß (1775–1851), Prussian field marshal and military writer
- James C. Mulvenon (born 1970), US political scientist, Chinese military expert
- Miyamoto Musashi (1584–1645), Japanese samurai, author of Gorin no Sho
- Ivan Musicant (born 1943), naval historian; The Banana Wars. A History of the United States Military Intervention in Latin America from the Spanish-American War to the Invasion of Panama (New York 1990)

=== N ===
- John Nagl (born 1966), US officer, military writer; Learning to Eat Soup with a Knife: Counterinsurgency Lessons from Malaya and Vietnam (Westport, CONN 2002)
- William Napier (1785–1860), British soldier and military historian; History of the War in the Peninsula and in the South of France from the Year 1807 to the Year 1814 (Carey and Hart, Philadelphia 1842)
- Anna Nadibaidze, expert in autonomous drones (contribution to Handbook of Drone Warfare, 2024)
- Napoleon, Military Maxims

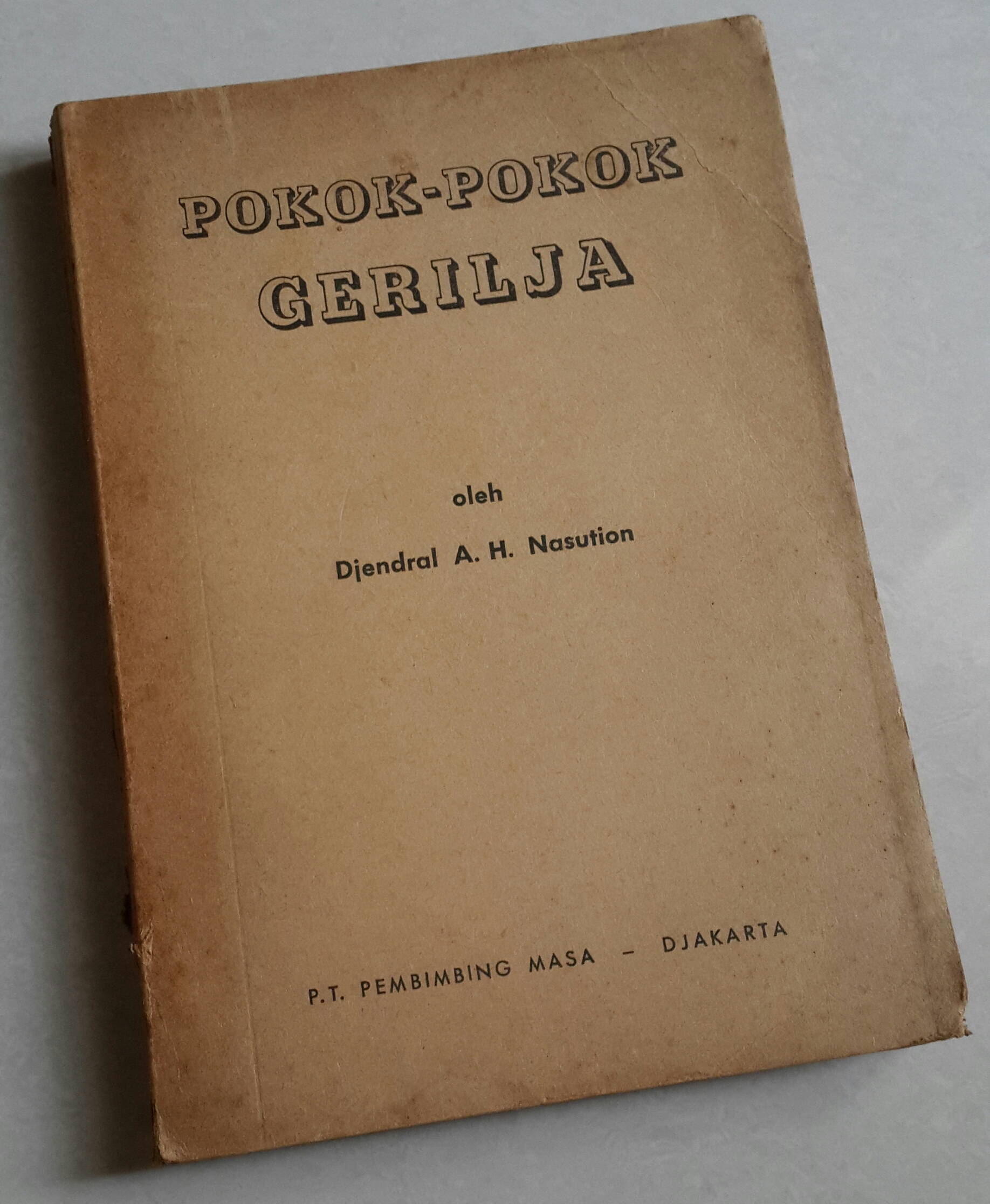
A. H. Nasution: Fundamentals of Guerrilla Warfare (Pokok-pokok Gerilja)

- Abdul Haris Nasution (1918–2000), Indonesian general, military writer; Fundamentals of Guerrilla Warfare (Pokok-pokok Gerilya)
- Álvaro de Navia-Osorio y Vigil, 3rd Marquis of Santa Cruz de Marcenado and Viscount of Puerto (1684–1732), Spanish diplomat, general, and author; Reflexiones militares (Military Reflections) (in seven volumes, Turin and Paris 1726-1730)
- Sönke Neitzel (born 1968), German historian, military history; Abgehört. Deutsche Generäle in britischer Kriegsgefangenschaft 1942–1945 (Berlin 2005); with Harald Welzer: Soldaten. Protokolle vom Kämpfen, Töten und Sterben (Frankfurt am Main 2011)
- A. Neuberg (collective pseudonym, etc. of Mikhail Nikolayevich Tukhachevsky, Ho Chi Minh und Hans Kippenberger): Der bewaffnete Aufstand. Versuch einer theoretischen Darstellung (Zürich 1928; English version: Armed Insurrection (London 1970)
- Virgil Ney (1905–1979), Col., US military historian; Notes on Guerrilla War: Principles and Practices (Washington, D.C. 1961)
- Ernst Nigmann (de) (1867–1923), officer, military writer; Felddienstübungen für farbige (ostafrikanische) Truppen (Deutsch-Ostafrikanische Zeitung, Daressalam 1910); Geschichte der Kaiserlichen Schutztruppe für Deutsch-Ostafrika (Berlin 1911)
- Kwame Nkrumah (1909–1972), Ghanaian politician; Handbook of Revolutionary Warfare (Digital copy)
- Wilhelm du Nord (1836–1909), Austrian officer and military writer
- Lon O. Nordeen, American author, Air Warfare in the Missile Age (2010); Harpoon Missile vs Surface Ships: US Navy, Libya and Iran 1986–88 (Duel 134, 2024)
- Nugroho Notosusanto (1930–1985), Indonesian military historian
- Walter Nuhn (born 1928); German author of works about German colonial history; Sturm über Südwest (Koblenz 1989); Flammen über Deutsch-Ostafrika. Der Maji-Maji-Aufstand 1905/06 (Bonn 1998); Feind überall. Guerillakrieg in Südwest. Der Große Nama-Aufstand 1904-1908 (Bonn 2000); Kamerun unter dem Kaiseradler. Geschichte der Erwerbung und Erschließung des ehemaligen deutschen Schutzgebietes Kamerun (Köln 2000); Kolonialpolitik und Marine. Die Rolle der Kaiserlichen Marine bei der Gründung und Sicherung des deutschen Kolonialreiches 1884-1914 (Bonn 2002); Auf verlorenem Posten - Deutsch-Südwestafrika im Ersten Weltkrieg (Bonn 2006)
- Roger H. Nye (1924–1996), US soldier and military writer

=== O ===
- Adam Ludwig Baron von Ochs (1759–1823), Hessian general, Betrachtungen über die neuere Kriegskunst über ihre Fortschritte und Veränderungen: und über die wahrscheinlichen Folgen welche für die Zukunft daraus entstehen werden (short: Considerations on Modern Warfare, Kassel 1817)
- Raymond T. Odierno (1954–2021), US general, involved in the development of the U.S. Army Field Manual 3-34 (FM 3-34), describing tactics for counterinsurgency operations, used by the US Army in Afghanistan from 2006 onwards
- Nikolai Vasilyevich Ogarkov (1917–1994), Marshal of the Soviet Union; Always Ready to Defend the Fatherland
- Onasander (1st century), Greek military writer; Strategikos
- Humberto Ortega (1947–2024), Nicaraguan general, military writer; Sobre la insurrección (Havanna 1981)
- Franklin Mark Osanka (1936–2016), US officer, military writer; Modern Guerrilla Warfare: Fighting Communist Guerilla Movements, 1941-1961 (1962)
- Robert Endicott Osgood (1921–1986), Limited War: The Challenge to American Strategy (1957); Limited War Revisited (1979)
- Albrecht Friedrich Rudolf, Archduke of Austria (1817–1895), Austrian field marshal; Über die Verantwortlichkeit im Krieg (On Responsibility in War)
- Adolf Ott (1842–1918), German soldier and writer

=== P ===
- Yuri Aleksandrovich Panteleyev (1901–1983), Soviet admiral; My Life for the Fleet
- Peter Paret (1924–2020), Understanding War: Essays on Clausewitz and the History of Military Power
- Antoine de Pas, Marquis de Feuquières (1648–1711), French general; Mémoires sur la guerre
- Gerhard von Pelet-Narbonne (de) (1840-1909), Prussian officer and military writer; editor of the series Erzieher des Preußischen Heeres (Educators of the Prussian Army)
- Peng Guangqian 彭光谦 (born 1943), Chinese military strategist; served as chief editor and published works such as Zhongguo guofang 中国国防 (China’s National Defense), Junshi zhanlüe jiben lilun wenti 军事战略基本理论问题 (Basic Theoretical Issues of Military Strategy), Junshi zhanlüe jianlun 军事战略简论 (A Brief Treatise on Military Strategy), Deng Xiaoping zhanlüe sixiang lun 邓小平战略思想论 (On Deng Xiaoping’s Strategic Thought), Zhanlüe xue 战略学 (The Science of Military Strategy), Zhong-Mei guanxi he woguo weilai guoji anquan huanjing 中美关系和我国未来国际安全环境 (China–U.S. Relations and the Future International Security Environment of Our Country)
- Lothar Persius (1864–1944), German naval officer and military author
- Carl Peters (1856–1918), German explorer and colonial administrator; Gefechtsweise und Expeditionsführung in Afrika (Berlin 1892)
- David Petraeus (born 1952), US general, military writer; initiator of FM 3-24 Counterinsurgency
- John Philippart (c. 1784–1875), British military writer
- Ardant du Picq (1821–1870), French colonel and military theorist; Études sur le Combat
- Thomas D. Pilcher (1858–1928), British officer, military writer; Some lessons from the Boer War 1899-1902 (London 1905)

Józef Piłsudski: Psychologia więźnia (1931)

- Józef Piłsudski (1867–1935), Polish statesman, Chief of State (1918–1922) and first Marshal of Poland (from 1920); Writings – Speeches – Orders of Józef Piłsudski (the first eleven-volume collection of his written legacy, published in 1930–1936 by the Józef Piłsudski Institute for Research in Modern History of Poland)
- John Pimlott (1948–1997), historian, was the Head of the Department of War Studies at the Royal Military Academy Sandhurst, author of books on 20th century military history
- Johannes Pohler (1851–?), German historian; Bibliotheca historico-militaris
- Markus Pöhlmann (born 1967), military historian
- Polyaenus (2nd century), author of Strategemata
- Polybius (c. 200–c. 118 BC), Greek historian
- Karl Eduard Pönitz (1795–1858), Saxon officer and military writer; Militärische Briefe eines Verstorbenen an seine noch lebenden Freunde, historischen, wissenschaftlichen, kritischen und humoristischen Inhalts. Zur unterhaltenden Belehrung für Eingeweihte u. Laien im Kriegswesen. (short: Military Letters of a Deceased, Adorf Verlagsbureau, 1841)
- Douglas Porch (born 1944), US military historian; The French Foreign Legion: A Complete History (Macmillan, London 1991)
- Robert W. Pringle; US-specialist on the Soviet Union and Eastern Europe, served in the United States Foreign Service and the Central Intelligence Agency; Historical Dictionary of Russian and Soviet Intelligence (2006)
- Adalbert of Prussia (1811–1873), German admiral
- Ruslan Pukhov (born 1973), Russian defense analyst; The Tanks of August; Brothers Armed
- Herbert Pürschel: Die Kaiserliche Schutztruppe für Kamerun. Gefüge und Aufgabe (Berlin 1936) Content: Entstehung der Schutztruppe und Entwicklung bis 1914 / Schutztruppe als Mittel zur Befriedung des Schutzgebietes / Die militärischen Kräfte des Schutzgebiets bei der Abwehr äußerer Gegner / Europäische Kriegsmittel in tropischen Gebieten
- Peter Purzelbaum (1884–1957), officer and military writer
- Ferdinand von Prondzynski (1804–1871), Prussian general; Theorie des Krieges (Theory of War)
- Jacques François de Chastenet de Puységur (1656–1743), Marshal of France; Art de la Guerre

=== Q ===
- Qiao Liang 乔良 (born 1955), Chinese author; Unrestricted Warfare (with Wang Xiangsui)
- Charles Sevin de Quincy (1660–1728), French artillery general; Histoire militaire du règne de Louis le Grand

=== R ===
- Erich Raeder (1876–1960), German admiral and military writer; Die französische Kolonialarmee (MR, 12. Jg., 1901, 700-709)
- Harold E. Raugh (born 1956), US military writer
- Oskar Regele (1890–1969), Austrian officer and military historian
- Frank Reichherzer (born 1977), military historian
- Markus Reisner (born 1978), Austrian historian and military expert
- Hellmuth Rentsch, officer, military writer; Partisanenkampf: Erfahrungen und Lehren
- Martin Rink (born 1966), German military historian; Vom "Partheygänger" zum Partisanen: die Konzeption des kleinen Krieges in Preußen 1740-1813 (Diss. 1998; content)
- James Patton Rogers, political scientist, expert on drone warfare; (ed.) Handbook of Drone Warfare (De Gruyter, Berlin 2024)
- Joseph Rogniat (fr) (1776-1840 ), Vicomte, French general; Considérations sur l'art de la guerre (1816), German translation: Betrachtungen über die Kriegskunst by J. A. Theobald (Cotta, Stuttgart 1823)
- Henri de Rohan (1579–1638), Huguenot leader; Le parfait Capitaine (1631)
- Heinrich Rohne (1842–1937), Prussian lieutenant general and military writer
- Erwin Rommel (1891–1944), German field marshal; Infanterie greift an (1937)
- Arthur Rosenberg (1889–1943), historian; A History of Bolshevism
- Pavel Rotmistrov (1901–1982), Soviet tank warfare theorist; Vremya i tanki Время и танки (memoirs, 1971); editor of Istoriya voennogo iskusstva История военного искусства (History of Military Art) (2 vols., Voenizdat, Moscow 1963)
- Friedrich Ruge (1894–1985), German vice admiral and military writer
- Wilhelm Rüstow (1821–1878), military writer and historian; Die Lehre vom kleinen Kriege (Zürich, 1864)
- Cornelius Ryan (1920–1974), The Longest Day; A Bridge Too Far

=== S ===
- Antonio Salinas, U.S. Army officer, military writer; Siren’s Song: The Allure of War; Boot Camp: The Making of a United States Marine; Leaving War: From Afghanistan's Pech Valley To Hadrian's Wall - A Veteran's Search For Peace
- Walerij Saluschnyj (born 1973), Ukrainian general; Modern positional warfare and how to win in it (2023)

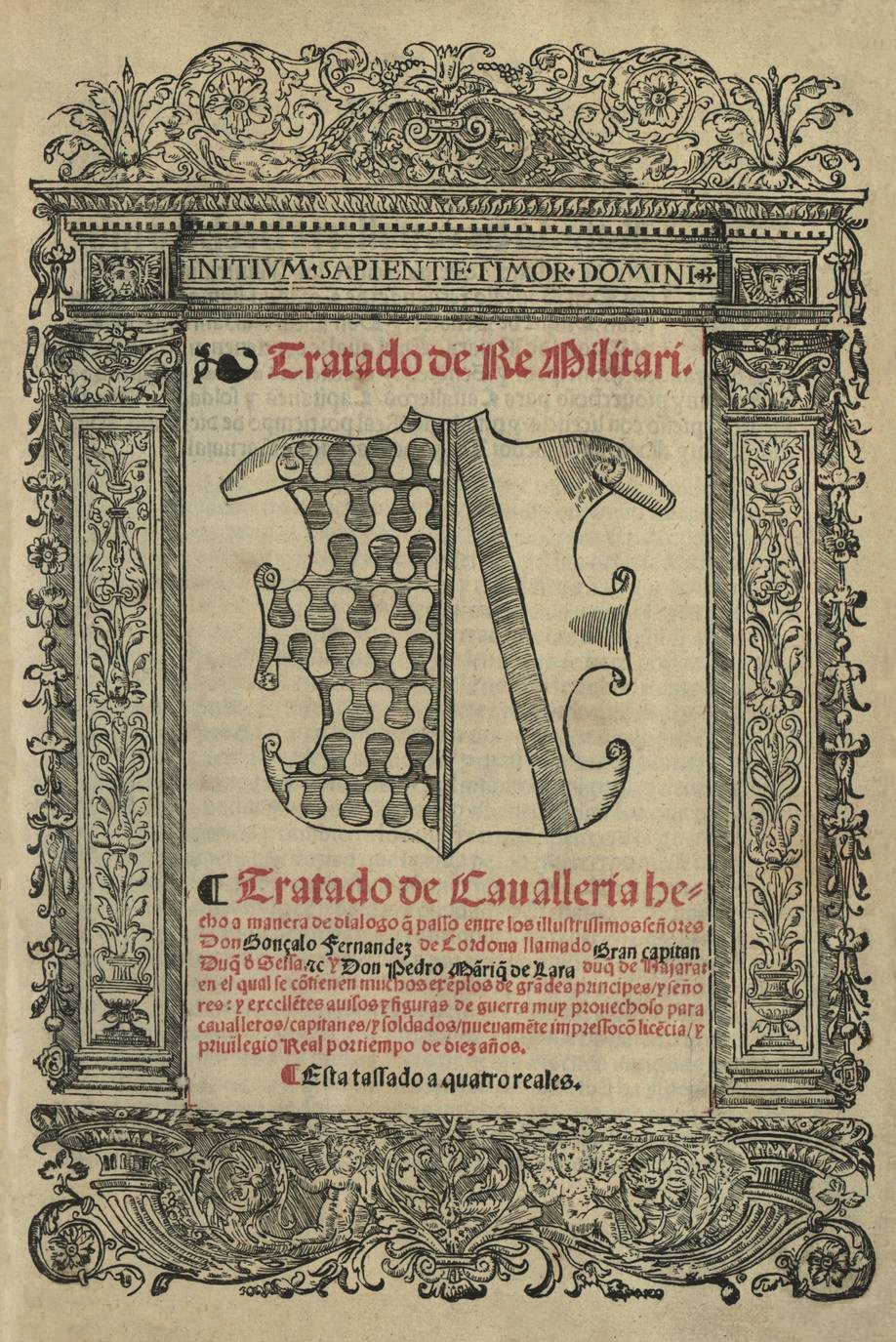
Diego de Salazar: Tratado de re militari

- Diego de Salazar (16th century), Spanish author; Tratado de re militari (a Latin adaptation of Machiavelli’s Dell'arte della guerra)
- L. Sambon, Italian military writer
- Felipe de San Juan; Instrucción de Guerrilla (Santiago de Chile, 1823; Tercera edicion, Lima 1822)
- Santa Cruz de Marcenado, see under Álvaro de Navia-Osorio y Vigil
- Aymon de Gingins-La Sarraz (1823-1893), Les partisans et la défense de la Suisse (1861) (Digital copy)
- Frances Stonor Saunders (born 1966); British journalist and historian; Who Paid the Piper?: CIA and the Cultural Cold War. Granta Books, London 1999
- Vasilii Efimovich Savkin; The Basic Principles of Operational Art and Tactics: A Soviet View (Moscow 1972; U.S. Government Printing Office, 1974)
- Ralph D. Sawyer (de), US expert on Chinese military history; The Seven Military Classics of Ancient China

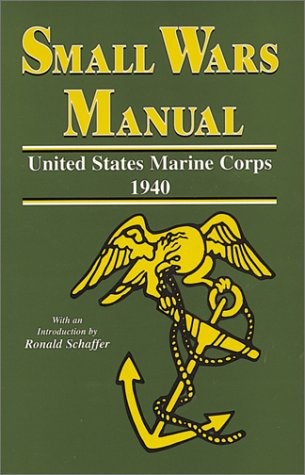
Small Wars Manual (United States Marine Corps 1940)

- Ronald Schaffer, US military historian; introduction to Small Wars Manual (United States Marine Corps, 1940)
- Emil Schalk, Summary of the Art of War (1862)
- Gerhard David von Scharnhorst (1755–1813), German field marshal and military writer
- Johann Baptist Schels (1780–1847 ), Austrian officer; Leichte Truppen; kleiner Krieg (Wien, 1813–14)
- Justus Scheibert (1831–1903), engineering officer
- Sigismund von Schlichting (1829–1909), infantry theorist
- Alfred Graf von Schlieffen (1833–1913), Chief of Germany's Great General Staff, designer of the Schlieffen Plan; Cannae: Studies of Envelopment
- Erwin A. Schmidl (born 1956), Austrian officer, military historian
- Helmut Schmidt (1918–2015), German politician, defense minister and chancellor; strategic writings
- Hugo Schmidt von Boneti (1866–1918), general major and military writer
- Paul von Schmidt (1837–1905), Prussian general major and military writer
- Jürgen W. Schmidt (born 1958), military historian
- Rochus Schmidt (1860–1938), officer, military writer; Geschichte des Araberaufstandes in Ost-Afrika. Seine Entstehung, seine Niederwerfung und seine Folgen (Berlin 1892)
- Heinrich Schnee (1871–1949), German lawyer, colonial civil servant; (ed.) Deutsches Koloniallexikon (German Colonial Lexicon) (Quelle and Meyer, Leipzig 1920, 3 vols. A-G, H-O, P-Z)
- Louis Schneider (1805–1878), actor, journalist, military writer
- Karl Ritter von Schönhals (1788–1857), Austrian field marshal, military writer
- Wilhelm von Schramm (1898–1983), German officer, journalist, military writer
- Lothar Schröter (born 1952), German military historian; Militärgeschichte der BRD (1989); Die NATO im Kalten Krieg: Die Geschichte des Nordatlantikpaktes bis zur Auflösung des Warschauer Vertrages (2 vols.: I: 1949-1975; II: 1976-1991) (2009); Der Ukrainekrieg (2025)
- Hagen Schulze (1943–2014), German historian; Freikorps und Republik 1918-1920 (Boppard 1968)
- Kurd Schwabe (de) (1866–1920), German officer, military writer; Dienst und Kriegführung in den Kolonien und auf überseeischen Expeditionen. Dargestellt und an Beispielen aus der kolonialen Kriegsgeschichte erläutert (Berlin 1903)
- Max Schwarte (de) (1860–1945), general, military writer
- von Schweinitz, officer, military writer
- Lazarus von Schwendi (1522–1583), diplomat and general; military writer
- Bernhard Schwertfeger (1868–1953), colonel and military writer
- Mychajlo Schyrochow (born 1974), Ukrainian historian and journalist
- Ludwig von Seddeler (1791–1852), Austrian-Russian lieutenant general, military historian
- Philippe-Paul de Ségur (1780–1873), French officer and military writer
- Alexander De Seversky (1894–1974), Entscheidung durch Luftmacht (Victory through Air Power)
- Sarah Sewall (born 1961), US security expert, military writer (new introduction to the FM 3-24 Counterinsurgency)
- L. J. Shadwell, Major; North-West Frontier Warfare. Being an Appendix to Sherston's "Tactics as Applied to Schemes" (Thacker, Spink & Co., Calcutta, 1902)
- Maxim Shepovalenko, Russian military analyst, Deputy Director of the Centre for Analysis of Strategies and Technologies (CAST); The Syrian Frontier
- Boris Shaposhnikov (1882–1945), Marshal of the Soviet Union; Mozg armii (Мозг армии, "The Brain of the Army") (1929)
- Leonty Shevtsov (born 1946), Russian colonel general; Новый взгляд на национальную военную стратегию (A new perspective on the national military strategy), Voyenno Promyshlennyy Kuryer, 2018
- Sergei Shtemenko (1907–1976), Soviet general, served as the Chief of the Soviet Armed Forces' General Staff from 1948 to 1952; postwar military doctrine and strategy; General'nyj štab v gody vojny Генеральный штаб в годы войны (The General Staff in the Years of War)
- Richard Simpkin (1921–1986), military theorist
- Peter W. Singer (born 1974), US political scientist, military historian; Wired for War
- Pushpinder Singh Chopra (1943–2021), Indian military historian
- Vladimir Slipchenko (1935–2005), Major General, military theorist, ties the idea of sixth-generation warfare to a concept of non-contact or contactless warfare; Voiny Novogo Pokolenia – Distantsionnye i Bezkontaktnye (Moscow 2004); Voyny shestogo pokoleniya. Oruzhiye i voennoye iskusstvo budushchego Войны шестого поколения. Оружие и военное искусство будущего (Sixth-Generation Wars: Weapons and Military Art of the Future) (2002)
- Pavel Smirnov (1888–1959), Soviet general major; Breaking Fortified Lines (1941)
- M. L. R. Smith (pseud.) (born 1963), political scientist, professor of strategic theory in the Department of War Studies at King's College, University of London; (with David Martin Jones (1950–2024)) The Political Impossibility of Modern Counterinsurgency: Strategic Problems, Puzzles, and Paradoxes (Columbia University Press 2015)
- Friedrich von Smitt (1787–1865), Russian historian of German origin
- Andrei Snesarev (1865–1937), Russian-Soviet military theorist
- Vasily Danilovich Sokolovsky (1897–1968), Marshal of the Soviet Union; Military Strategy
- Siegfried Sorge (1898–1989), German rear admiral and military writer
- Lennart Souchon (born 1942), German strategist and scholar of political philosophy and military theory; (ed.) Der Einsatz von Seestreitkräften im Dienst der auswärtigen Politik (Herford 1983)
- Emil Spannocchi (1916–1992), Austrian military officer and military theorist; Verteidigung ohne Selbstzerstörung ("Defense without self-destruction") in: Spannochi, E. & Brossollet G. Verteidigung ohne Schlacht ("Defense without battle"). Vienna: Carl Hanser Verlag (1977).
- Rolf Steinhaus (1916–2004), German vice admiral and military writer
- Karol Bogumił Stolzman (1793–1854); Partyzantka czyli Wojna dla ludów powstających najwłaściwsza (Partisan Warfare, that is, the war most suitable for emerging peoples) (Paryż; Lipsk; Poitiers 1844)
- Norman Stone (1941–2019), British historian and author; The Eastern Front. 1914–1917 (Hodder and Stoughton, London 1975)
- Hew Strachan (born 1949), British military historian; (with Richard Holmes, eds.) The Oxford Companion to Military History (2001)
- Jürg Stüssi-Lauterburg (de) (born 1954), Swiss military historian, former head of the military Library am Guisanplatz (in Bern), and politician; (ed.) Mit Suworow in der Schweiz: das Tagebuch des Hauptmanns Nikolaj A. Grjazew vom russischen Alpenfeldzug des Jahres 1799; mit einer Zeittafel zur Schweiz der Jahre 1798 bis 1802. 2013 (with a foreword by Ueli Maurer and an introductory note by Alexander I. Kuzmin)
- Prabowo Subianto (born 1951), Indonesian politician, businessman and former military officer, On the Art of Military Leadership (original Indonesian title: Kepemimpinan Militer "Military Leadership")
- Sun Tzu (c. 544–496 BC), Chinese general; The Art of War
- Matthew Sutcliffe (1550?–1629), English clergyman, academic and lawyer; Practice, Proceedings and Lawes of Armes (1593)
- Alexander Suvorov (1730–1800), Russian generalissimo; The Art of Victory Наука побеждать (1795)
- Viktor Suvorov (Виктор Суворов), pseudonym of Vladimir Bogdanovich Rezun (born 1947), former Soviet GRU officer, author of non-fiction books about the Soviet Army, military intelligence, and special forces; The Liberators, Inside the Soviet Army, Inside Soviet Military Intelligence, Aquarium (his memoir), and Spetsnaz
- Alexander Svechin (1878–1938), Soviet military officer and theoretician, thoughts on warfare and strategy; Strategiya (Strategy, first published in 1923); Evolyutsiya voyennogo iskusstva (Evolution of Military Art); Istoriya voyennogo iskusstva (History of Military Art); (ed.) Strategiya v trudakh voennykh klassikov Стратегия в трудах военных классиков (Strategy in the Works of Military Classics) (2 vols., Moskow 1924-1926)

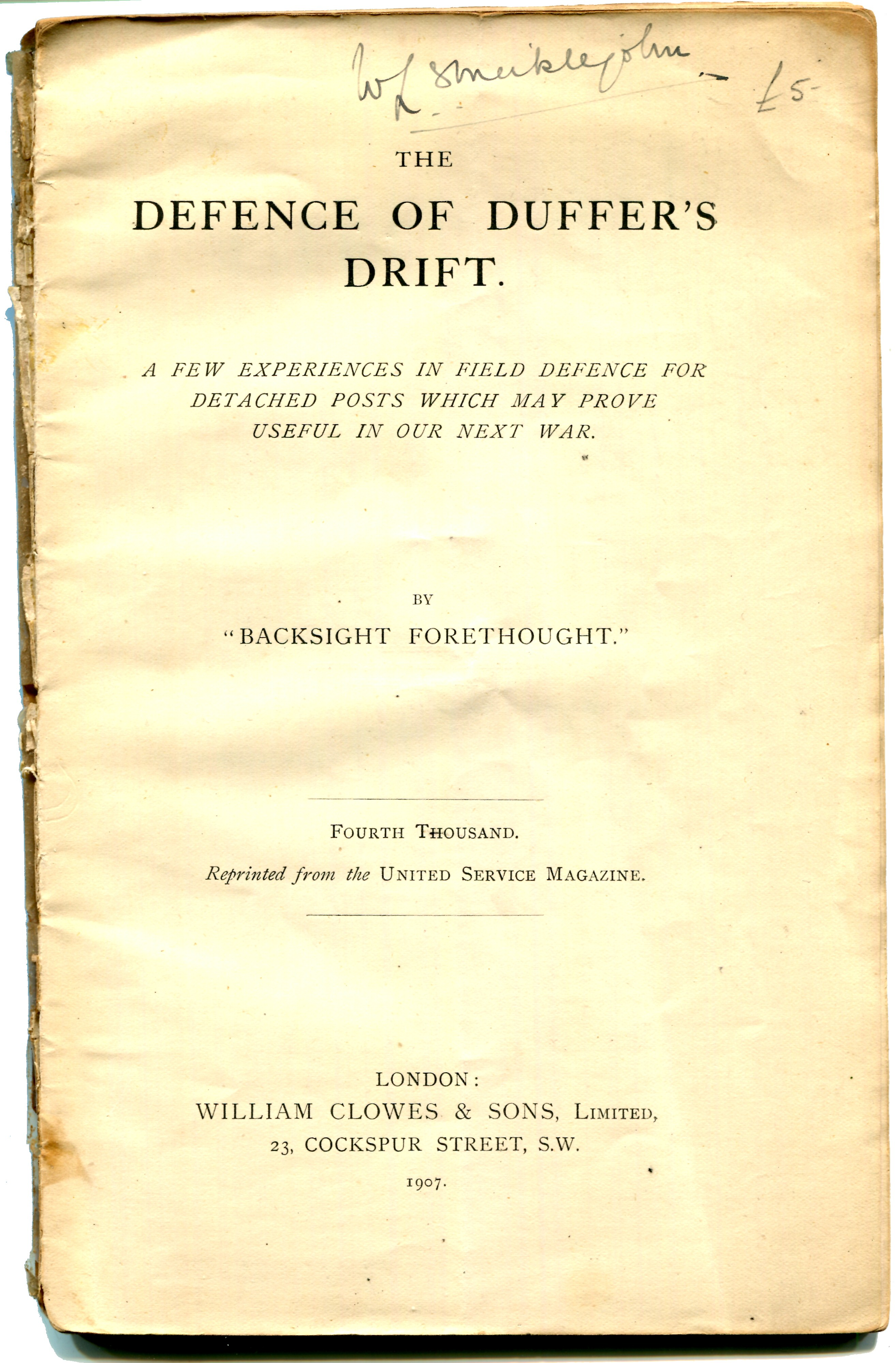
Lieutenant "Backsight Forethought": The Defence of Duffer's Drift (ed. 1907)

- Ernest Swinton (1868–1951), British Army officer and military author, played a part in the development and adoption of the tank during the First World War; The Defence of Duffer's Drift (London 1904, pseudonym "Backsight Forethought"; see also the new edition of the U.S. Army Command and General Staff College, Fort Leavenworth, Kansas)
- Syed Ameer Ali (1849–1928), A Short History of the Saracens
- Richard Szafranski, US officer, military writer

=== T ===
- al-Tabari (839–923), Persian historian; Tārīkh
- Karl Tanera (1849–1904), travel and military writer
- Stefan Terzibaschitsch (1926–2008), German-Serbian naval writer
- Washington Carroll Tevis (1829–1900), American-born soldier of fortune; La Petite guerre et le service des avant-postes (1855)
- Charles W. Thayer (1910–1969), US diplomat, military writer, Guerrillas and Partisans: Nature and Methods of Irregular Warfare (1964)
- Maximilian Friedrich von Thielen (1781–1856), officer and military writer
- Timothy L. Thomas, US Colonel (ret.), Western Russia specialist, senior analyst at the Foreign Military Studies Office at Ft. Leavenworth, KS, served as Director of Soviet Studies at the United States Army Russian Institute (USARI) in Garmisch, Germany; writings on Russian perspectives on future warfare; “Thinking Like a Russian Officer: Basic Factors and Contemporary Thinking on the Nature of War” (FMSO, Kansas, April 2016)
- Robert Grainger Ker Thompson (1916–1992), British military officer and counter-insurgency expert; Defeating Communist Insurgency (1966)

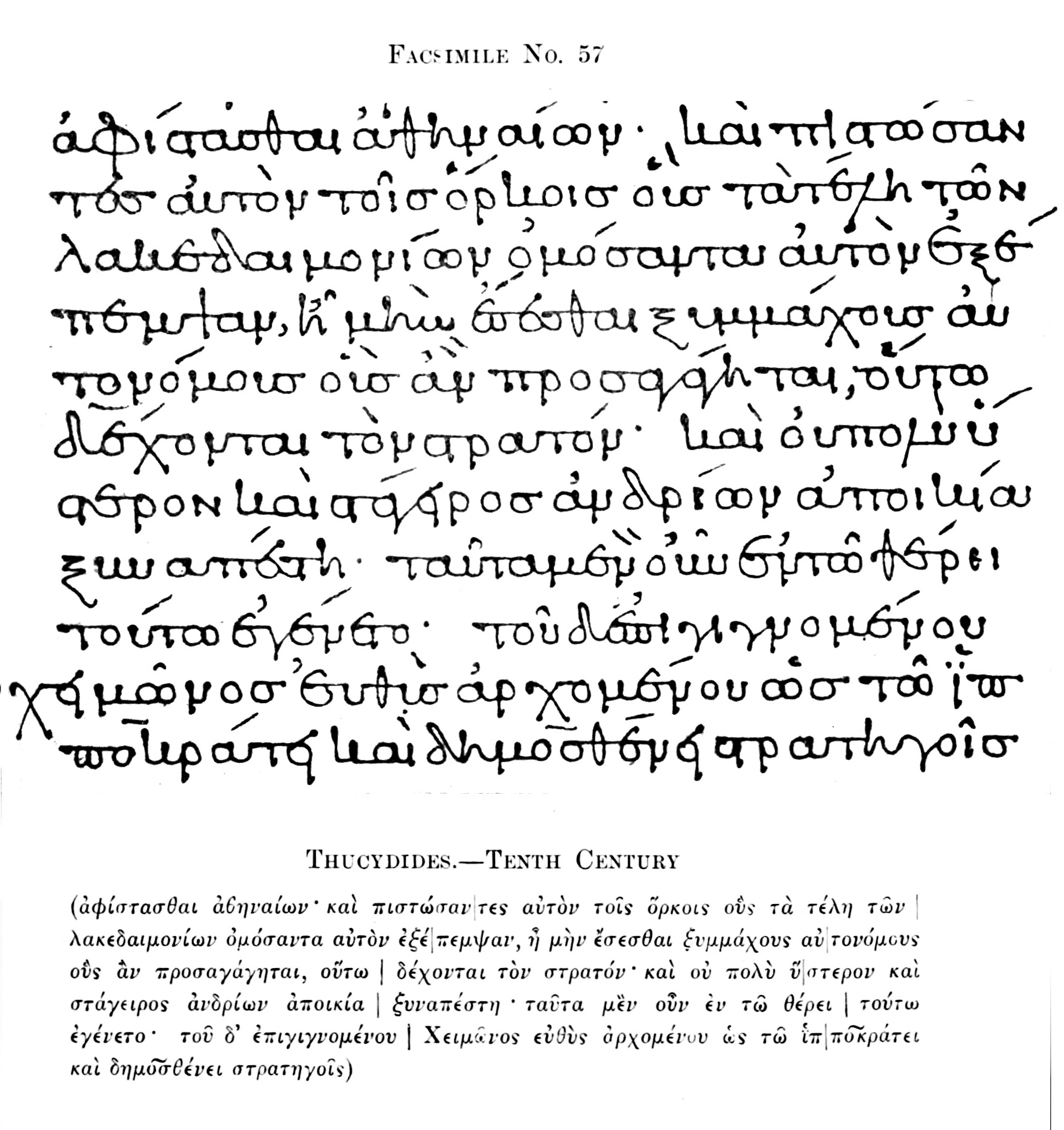
10th-century minuscule manuscript of Thucydides' History of the Peloponnesian War

- Thucydides (c. 454–c. 399/396 BC), Ancient Greek author of History of the Peloponnesian War
- Alfred von Tirpitz (1849–1930), German Grand Admiral and naval strategist
- Eduard Ivanovich von Totleben (1818–1884), German-Baltic Russian general; Defense of Sevastopol (2 vols., 1863–1878)
- Arnold J. Toynbee (1889–1975), War and Civilization: A Study of History (1957)
- Hans Karl Heinrich von Trautzschen (1730–1812), poet and military writer; Military and Literary Letters of Mr. von T. (1769)
- Vladimir Kiriakovich Triandafillov (1894–1931), Soviet military theorist, especially of operational art; The Scope of Operations of Modern Armies (1926), The Character of Operations of Modern Armies (1929)
- Georg Trierenberg (20th century), German officer, military writer; Togo, die Aufrichtung der deutschen Schutzherrschaft und die Erschliessung des Landes (Mittler, Berlin 1914)
- Roger Trinquier (1908–1986), French paratrooper officer, military writer; Modern Warfare (1961)
- Philippe-Charles-Jean-Baptiste Tronson du Coudray (1738–1777), French military writer; Mémoire sur la meilleure méthode d'extraire et de raffiner le salpêtre (1774)
- Dmitry Tselorungo, Russian military historian; Officers and soldiers of the Russian army during the Patriotic War of 1812: Social portraits and service Офицеры и солдаты российской армии эпохи Отечественной войны 1812 года: социальные портреты и служба (Borodino 2017)
- Yamamoto Tsunetomo (1659–1719), author of Hagakure
- Franjo Tudman (1922–1999), Croatian politician and historian; Rat protiv rata: Partizanski rat u prošlosti i budućnosti (War Against War: The Partisan War in the Past and the Future) (Zagreb, 1957)
- Mikhail Tukhachevsky (1893–1937), Marshal of the Soviet Union; military theorist, "deep operations” theory, mechanized warfare pioneer
- Henri de La Tour d’Auvergne, vicomte de Turenne (1611–1675), French general and Marshal of France
- Lancelot Turpin de Crissé (1716–1793), French military writer; Essai sur l’art de la guerre (1754)
- Nick Turse (born 1975), US journalist and historian; Tomorrow’s Battlefield
- Nikolay Tyutyunnikov Николай Николаевич Тютюнников; Russian military writer, various articles on military thought; Voyennaya mysl’ v terminakh i opredeleniyakh Военная мысль в терминах и определения (Military Thought in Terms and Definitions) (3 vols., Pero, Moscow 2018)

=== U ===
- Kurt Wilhelm Uebe, officer, military writer
- Harold H. Utley, major; An Introduction to the Tactics and Technique of Small Wars (Marine Corps Gazette, 1931/1933)
- Robert M. Utley (1929–2022), American author and historian, authority on the history of the American West; Frontier Regulars. The United States Army and the Indian 1866-1891 (Lincoln, NE/London 1973)
- Mesut Uyar (born 1969), Turkish political scientist and historian; A Military History of the Ottomans: From Osman to Atatürk (with Edward J. Erickson)

=== V ===
- Jukums Vācietis (Ioakim Ioakimovich Vatsetis; 1873–1938), Latvian and Soviet military commander; O voyennoy doktrine budushchego О военной доктрине будущего (On the Military Doctrine of the Future) (1923)
- Georg Wilhelm von Valentini (1775–1834); Die Lehre vom Krieg (1820)
- Roberto Valturio (1405–1475), Italian author of De re militari (1460)
- Bernardo de Vargas Machuca (1557–1622), Spanish military theorist; Milicia y descripción de las Indias (1599)
- Valentin Varennikov (1923–2009), strategist and memoirist on Soviet operational art; memoirs published under the title The Unrepeatable Неповторимое (2001-2, 7 vols.)
- Sébastien Le Prestre de Vauban (1633–1707), French general and fortress engineer; Traité de l'attaque et de la deffence des places
- Vaultier (18th century), artillery commissary; Observations sur l'art de faire la guerre
- Flavius Vegetius Renatus, Roman military writer; Epitoma rei militaris
- Julius von Verdy du Vernois (1832–1910), Prussian infantry general and military theorist
- Ivan Vinarov (1896–1969), Fighter on the Silent Front
- David Vine (born 1974), US anthropologist and author on overseas US military presence, Lily-Pad Strategy; Base Nation: How U.S. Military Bases Abroad Harm America and the World (2015); The United States of War: A Global History of America’s Endless Conflicts, from Columbus to the Islamic State (2020); Lists of U.S. Military Bases Abroad, 1776-2021
- Aleksandr Vladimirov (born 1945); Russian Major General (ret.); Osnovy obshchey teorii voyny Основы общей теории войны (Fundamentals of the General Theory of War)
- Võ Nguyên Giáp (1911–2013), Vietnamese general; strategist of the First Indochina War; The Big Victory, The Great Task (1967); Military Art of People's War: Selected Writings (1970)
- Eduard Freiherr von Völderndorff und Waradein (1783–1847), Bavarian major general and military writer; Observations sur l'ouvrage de Mr. le Comte Ph. de Ségur (1826)
- Abram Mironovich Volpe Абрам Миронович Вольпе (1894–1937), Soviet military; Фронтальный удар: эволюция форм оперативного маневра в позиционный период мировой войны (Frontal Strike: Evolution of Forms of Operational Maneuver in the Positional Period of the World War) (State Military Publishing House, Moscow 1931)
- Ivan Vasilievich Vuich Иван Васильевич Вуич (1813–1884), Russian military, Malaia voina Малая война (St. Petersburg, 1850)

=== W ===
- John D. Waghelstein (1937–2025), US officer, military writer; El Salvador: Observations and Experiences in Counterinsurgency: an Individual Study Project (Army War College, 1985)
- Gerhard Wagner (1898–1987), German admiral and military theorist
- Johann Jacobi von Wallhausen (1580–1627), early German military writer; Kriegskunst zu Fuß (1615)
- Timothy A. Walton, US political scientist; Three Warfares
- Wang Xiangsui (born 1954), Chinese author; Unrestricted Warfare (with Qiao Liang)
- Nikolai Efimovich Varfolomeev (1890–1939), Soviet military commander and theorist
- Edward Wegener (1904–1981), German and NATO admiral, military theorist
- Wolfgang Wegener (1875–1956), German vice admiral and naval strategist
- Wei Liao 尉缭 (Warring States period), Chinese military theorist; Wei Liaozi
- Dieter Wellershoff (1933–2005), German admiral, Inspector General of the Bundeswehr
- Harald Welzer (born 1958), German social psychologist; Climate Wars: What People Will Be Killed For in the 21st Century (Polity Press 2012); with Sönke Neitzel: Soldaten. Protokolle vom Kämpfen, Töten und Sterben (Frankfurt am Main 2011)
- Wlodimir Stanislaus Ritter von Wilczynski (19th century), Theorie des grossen Krieges: mit Hilfe des kleinen oder Partisanen-Krieges (Vienna 1869)
- Reinhold von Werner (1825–1909), German vice admiral and military writer
- Wolfram Wette (born 1940), German military historian and peace researcher; Armee gegen die eigenen Bürger? – Historische Erfahrungen in Deutschland (2006, journal article)
- Georg Cardinal von Widdern (1841–1920), German military writer; Der Kleine Krieg und Der Etappendienst (2nd ed., Eisenschmidt, Berlin 1899)
- Gerhard Wiechmann (born 1958), German historian; Guerilla und small wars (2023)
- Johannes Wieland (1791–1832), Swiss officer and military writer
- Karl Wilhelm von Willisen (1790–1879), Prussian general and military writer; Theorie des großen Krieges angewendet auf den russisch-polnischen Feldzug von 1831 (Theory of the Great War Applied to the Russo-Polish Campaign of 1831)
- Ulrich Wille (1848–1925), Swiss general and military theorist
- William of Tyre (12th century), Chronica
- William, Count of Schaumburg-Lippe (1724–1777), military theorist, Scharnhorst's mentor
- Martin Windrow (1944–2025), British historian and publisher, long time series editor of Osprey's Men-at-Arms and Elite series
- Hermann von Wissmann (1853–1904), German explorer and administrator in Africa; Afrika. Schilderungen und Rathschläge zur Vorbereitung für den Aufenthalt und Dienst in den Deutschen Schutzgebieten (Africa. Accounts and Advice for the Preparation for Residence and Service in the German Protectorates, Berlin 1894)
- Garnet Wolseley (1833-1913), British general; The Soldier's Pocket Book (5th ed. 1886; 1st ed. 1869)
- Robert Wooster, American historian, authority on the history of the U.S. Army in the nineteenth-century American West; The Military and United States Indian Policy 1865-1903 (New Haven/London 1987)
- Quincy Wright (1890–1970), A Study of War (1965)
- M. le Bon de Wüst; L'Art militaire du partisan (1768)
- Joseph Caldwell Wylie (1911–1993), US naval officer; Military Strategy: A General Theory of Power Control (1967)

=== X ===
- Xenophon (c. 430–after 355 BC), Greek writer; Anabasis
- Rudolf von Xylander (1872–1946), Bavarian general and military historian

=== Y ===
- Yagyū Munenori (1571–1646), Japanese swordmaster and author; Heihō kadensho
- Mohammad Yousaf (born 1937), Pakistani military officer and historian; The Bear Trap (with Mark Atkin)

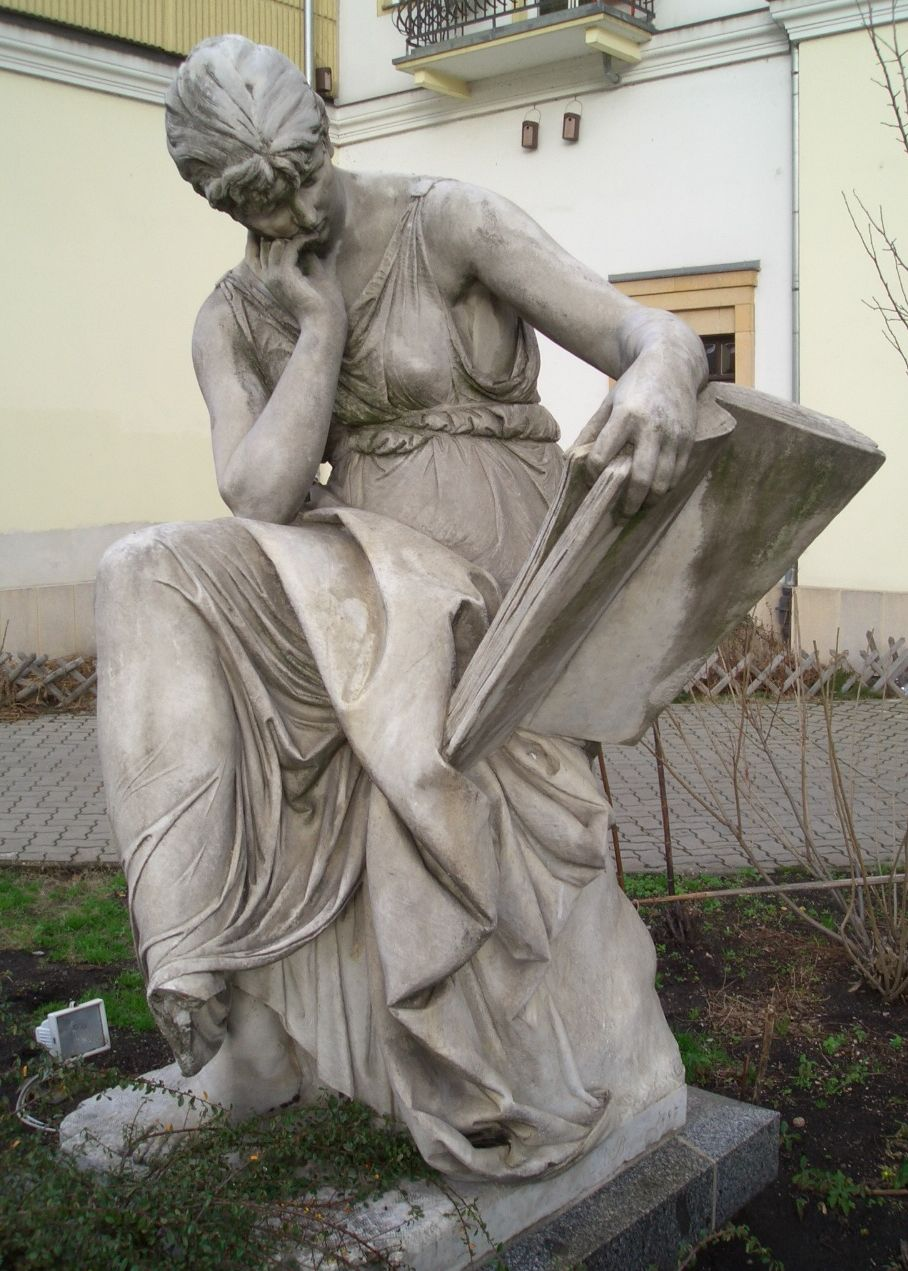
Reinhold Begas: Military Science, 1887, marble (commissioned work for the Hall of Fame in Berlin)

=== Z ===
- Mykhailo Zabrodskyi (born 1973), Russian-trained Ukrainian military writer
- Andrei Zayonchkovsky (1862–1926), Russian infantry general, military historian and theorist
- Friedrich Wilhelm von Zanthier (1741–1781), officer and military theorist; Versuch über die Märsche der Armeen (1778)
- Zhuge Liang (181–234), strategist of the Three Kingdoms; Collected Works (Zhuge Liang ji 諸葛亮集)
- Alfred Zimmermann (de) (1859–1925), colonial politician and publicist in the German Empire; Geschichte der deutschen Kolonialpolitik (Ernst Siegfried Mittler und Sohn, Berlin 1914)
- Nikolaus Zrinski (1620–1664), Ban of Croatia, imperial general, poet, and military writer
- Sherifa Zuhur (born 1953), US academic and security analyst on the Middle East
- Beat Fidel Zurlauben (1720–1799), Swiss Guard general; Histoire militaire des Suisses au Service de la France (eight volumes, 1751-1753, with four additional volumes Code militaire des Suisses, 1758-1764)

== See also ==
- List of military writers
