= John Pimlott =

John Pimlott may refer to:

- John Pimlott (footballer), English footballer
- John Pimlott (historian), British military historian
- John Alfred Ralph Pimlot, British historian of tourism
