= Lothar Schröter =

German military historian

Lothar Schröter (born 1952) is a German military historian.

He studied history and Russian at the Pädagogische Hochschule in Leipzig from 1970 to 1974. He later completed postgraduate studies in military history. He began his career as a research assistant at the Military History Institute in Potsdam, where he later served as a doctoral and habilitated senior assistant and lecturer until 1990. Afterwards, he worked in professional education and continuing training until retirement. Schröter has authored numerous works on military and security issues. Notable publications include: Militärgeschichte der BRD (1989); Die NATO im Kalten Krieg (2009, 2 vols.); USA – Supermacht oder Koloss auf tönernen Füßen? (2009); Künftige Supermacht in Asien? Militärpolitik und Streitkräfte der Volksrepublik China (2011); Der Ukrainekrieg: Die Wurzeln, die Akteure und die Rolle der NATO (2025).

== See also ==
- List of military theorists and writers
