= FM 3-24 Counterinsurgency =

US Army manual

FM 3-24 Counterinsurgency is a US Army manual, created by General David H. Petraeus and James F. Amos. The foreword is by Sarah Sewall. The document has been credited with changing for the better the US approach to insurgency in Iraq. However, FM 3-24 (along with other counterinsurgency policies) has been quite heavily criticized, mainly for its paradoxical claims.

== See also ==
- Counter-insurgency
- Propaganda
- Irregular warfare
