= Peng Guangqian =

Chinese army officer (born 1943)

Peng Guangqian (彭光谦), born in November 1943 in Huangpi, Hubei, is a major general in the People's Liberation Army and a strategist for China's Academy of Military Science. On December 3, 2003 he warned that "Taiwan independence means war" and that Beijing was willing to risk diplomatic isolation, economic recession, a loss of foreign investment and a boycott of the 2008 Olympics to prevent Taiwan independence.
