= História geral das guerras angolanas =

1680 book by António de Oliveira de Cadornega

General History of the Angolan Wars
- Author: António de Oliveira de Cadornega
- Original title: História geral das guerras angolanas
- Language: Portuguese
- Subject: History of Angola
- Genre: History
- Publisher: Lisbon: Agência Geral do Ultramar (1972 edition)
- Publication date: 1680
- Publication place: Portugal
- Media type: Print
- Pages: 3 volumes

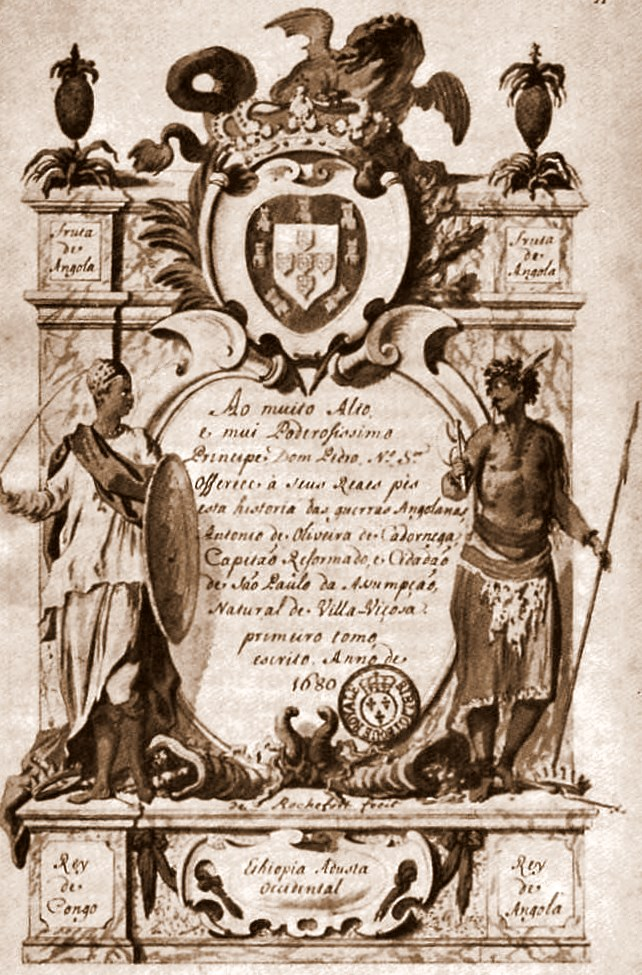
História geral das guerras angolanas (1680), by Capitão reformado e cidadão de S. Paulo da Assunção, natural de Vila Viçosa

General History of the Angolan Wars (Portuguese: História Geral das Guerras Angolanas) is a historical work written by António de Oliveira de Cadornega (pt) (c. 1623–1690) and first published in Lisbon in 1680. It is regarded as the first major historical account written in Angola by a long-term resident.

== Author ==
António de Oliveira de Cadornega was a Portuguese military officer and chronicler. He lived for about fifty years in Angola, including twenty-eight years in Massangano and twenty-three years in Luanda. Serving as a captain in the Portuguese colonial forces, he documented both the wars of conquest and the societies of Angola during the 17th century.

Upon his arrival in Luanda in October 1639, he witnessed the attack on the city carried out by the Dutch forces, an event he later described in detail.

== Content ==
The Portuguese military campaigns in Angola form the core of his work, which provides a comprehensive account of the Portuguese occupation of the region. The book is also notable for its rich ethnographic, geographical, and sociological observations. The historian Arlindo Correia described it as “a book [...] of purity, spontaneity, and truthfulness, of enthusiasm and patriotism that captivate us.”

A facsimile reproduction of his General History of the Angolan Wars was published between 1940 and 1942, annotated and revised by José Matias Delgado (1865–1932). It was printed by the Portuguese state press (Imprensa Nacional-Casa da Moeda), under the authority of the Agência-Geral do Ultramar (General Agency for Overseas Territories), in Lisbon in 1972, in three volumes.

== Content and significance ==
Cadornega's work provides a detailed narrative of the Portuguese conquest and local resistance in Angola. Unlike many other contemporary “Histories of Angola,” which emphasized the missionary role of Christianity, the General History of the Angolan Wars presents a broader perspective, reflecting military, political, and social aspects of the region.

As the first comprehensive history of Angola authored by a resident, it offers unique insights into both Portuguese colonial activity and local African polities. The book was originally written for a readership in Portugal and Brazil interested in Angola's history and affairs.

== Editions ==
- First edition (1680) Lisbon.
- Modern edition (1972) Agência Geral do Ultramar, Lisbon, annotated and corrected by José Matias Delgado.

== Bibliography ==
- António de Oliveira de Cadornega, História Geral das Guerras Angolanas, Lisbon, 1680.
- António de Oliveira de Cadornega, História Geral das Guerras Angolanas, annotated by José Matias Delgado, 3 vols., Agência Geral do Ultramar, Lisbon, 1972. (Online: 1, 2, 3)
- Miguel Junior: Analysis of the General History of Angolan Wars (1575–1680) of Antonio Oliveira de Cadornega. 2017

== See also ==
- History of Angola
- Portuguese Angola
- Colonial history of Africa
