= Summary of the Art of War =

1830 military treatise

- Author: Antoine-Henri Jomini
- Original title: Précis de l’Art de la Guerre: Des Principales Cominaisons de la Stratégie, de la Grande Tactique et de la Politique
- Subject: War
- Publication date: 1830

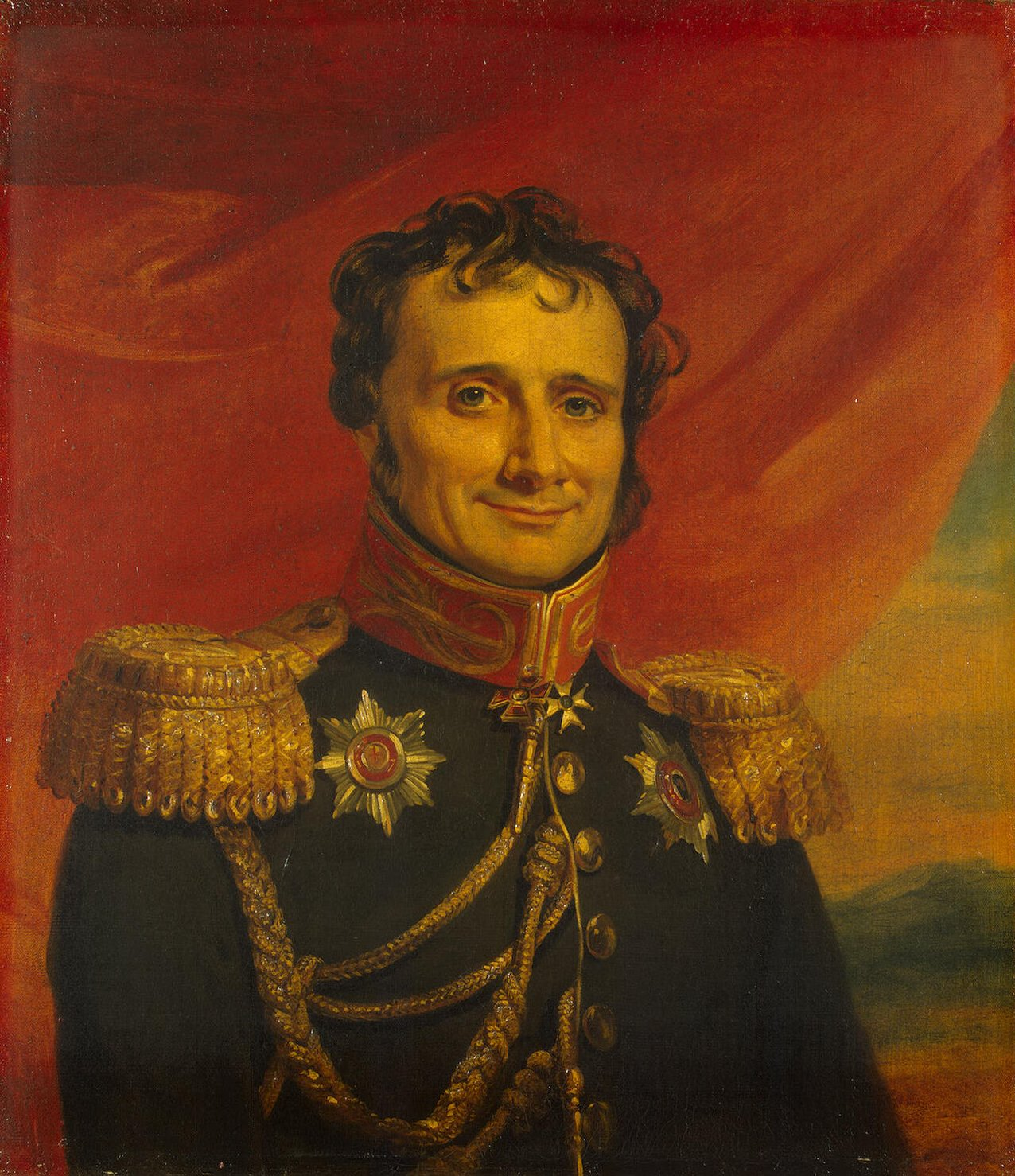
Antoine-Henri Jomini.

Summary of the Art of War: the Principal Combinations of Strategy, Grand Tactics, and Military Politics (French: Précis de l’Art de la Guerre: Des Principales Cominaisons de la Stratégie, de la Grande Tactique et de la Politique) is a military treatise by Antoine-Henri Jomini, originally published as a complete work in 1838. The work, which lays out Jomini's theory of war, includes a series of maxims that were extensively taught and discussed at the United States Military Academy.

== Content ==
Summary of the Art of War focuses on war policy and "the problems of adapting military means to political objectives". Jomini implied both the diplomatic and military importance of territory (for example as necessary to raising manpower as well as resources needed for maintenance of an army). However, he did not make territory the target of military operations, seeing the defeat of the enemy army as the "only effective means of accomplishing a war of invasion". The work is perhaps known for its maxims that explained a principle he believed underlies all war :

1. "To throw by strategic movements the mass of an army, successively, upon the decisive points of a theater of war, and also upon the communications of the enemy as much as possible without compromising one's own."
2. "To maneuver to engage fractions of the hostile army with the bulk of one's forces."
3. "On the battlefield, to throw the mass of the forces upon the decisive point, or upon the portion of the hostile line which it is of the first importance to overthrow."
4. "To so arrange that these masses shall not only be thrown upon the decisive point but that they shall engage at the proper times and with energy."

== Legacy ==
It is considered Jominis' greatest work; the historian Mark T. Calhoun has called it Jomini's "capstone", and Robert B. Marks of Legacy Books Press has referred to it as the author's "magnum opus". Used extensively at West Point, it gave birth to the saying "that many a Civil War general went into battle with a sword in one hand and Jomini's Summary of the Art of War in the other".
