= John Pimlott (historian) =

British military historian

- Born: 1948; Brigg
- Died: 24 October 1997 (aged 48–49); Surrey
- Education: University of Leicester
- Occupations: Member of the war studies department at Royal Military Academy Sandhurst, historian
- Years active: 1973–1997

John Pimlott (1948, Brigg — 24 October 1997, Surrey) was the Head of the Department of War Studies at the Royal Military Academy Sandhurst, also known as a prolific author of books on 20th century military history.

== Early years and education ==
After studying at Brigg Grammar School, in Lincolnshire, and the University of Leicester, he received a PhD for a thesis on the administration of the British Army between 1783 and 1793.

== Career ==
John Pimlott was the Head of the Department of War Studies at the Royal Military Academy Sandhurst from 1994, institution where he worked since 1973.

He is best known for editing books on 20th century military history for the general public. The subject matter of his books covers the conflicts of the First and Second World Wars, the conflicts in the Middle East and the Vietnam War, specifically focusing on the guerrilla warfare aspects of this conflict. Pimlott argued that the British approach to counterinsurgency was more successful than the approaches of other European overseas empires.

== Works ==
His works include illustrated books as War in Peace (London: Marshall Cavendish, 1987), Nam: The Vietnam Experience 1965–75 (London: Hamlyn Publishing, 1988), Vietnam: The History and Tactics (New York: Crescent Books, 1982), Battle of the Bulge (London:Bison, 1985) or Guerrilla Warfare (New York: Military Press, 1985).

== Death ==
Pimlott died when two grenades picked up during a visit to a battlefield site exploded in his studio in Surrey.
