= History of guerrilla warfare =

The history of guerrilla warfare stretches back to ancient history. While guerrilla tactics can be viewed as a natural continuation of prehistoric warfare, the Chinese general and strategist Sun Tzu, in his The Art of War (6th century BCE), was the earliest to propose the use of guerrilla warfare. This directly inspired the development of modern guerrilla warfare. Communist leaders like Mao Zedong and North Vietnamese Ho Chi Minh both implemented guerrilla warfare in the style of Sun Tzu, which served as a model for similar strategies elsewhere, such as the Cuban "foco" theory and the anti-Soviet Mujahadeen in Afghanistan. While the tactics of modern guerrilla warfare originate in the 20th century, irregular warfare, using elements later characteristic of modern guerrilla warfare, has existed throughout the battles of many ancient civilizations.

== Ancient ==
General and strategist Sun Tzu, in his The Art of War (6th century BC), was one of the first proponents of the use of guerrilla warfare. The earliest description of guerrilla warfare is an alleged battle between Emperor Huang and the Myan people (Miao) in China. Guerrilla warfare was not unique to China; nomadic and migratory tribes such as the Scythians, Goths, Vandals, and Huns used elements of guerrilla warfare to fight the Persian Empire, the Roman Empire, and Alexander the Great.

Quintus Fabius Maximus Verrucosus, widely regarded as the "father of guerrilla warfare" of his time, devised the Fabian strategy which was used to great effect against Hannibal's army during the Second Punic War.

Guerrilla warfare was also a common strategy of the various Celtic, Germanic and African tribes that the Romans faced through their history. Their first great exponent would be the Lusitanian chieftain Viriathus, whose knowledge of guerrilla tactics earned him eight years of victories over the Roman armies. He would die by treason without being ever decisively bested on the battlefield. The Arverni Gaul Vercingetorix also favored mobile warfare and cutting of supply lines in his revolt against the Roman Republic in 52 BC, and Arminius from the Germanic Cherusci capitalized on the terrain and the Imperial Roman army formations to win the Battle of the Teutoburg Forest. Another example of an enemy using guerrilla was Tacfarinas, chief of Numidian rebels, who forced the Roman Empire into allying with neighboring natives in order to finally defeat him. Later Caratacus, the war chief of the British Catuvellauni, employed guerrilla warfare mixed in with occasional set-piece battles for eight years. Although Caratacus was ultimately captured by the Romans, Tacitus writes that they respected him.

In the Classic Ancient world, this kind of warfare was indirectly mentioned by the Greeks in Homeric stories, but usually as hit and run acts of foraging for booty in enemy territory, pretty much as later Vikings piracy. There are not many examples of guerrilla in ancient Greek warfare, though the Aetolians did make use of it against Demosthenes and his heavy hoplite infantry during the Aetolian campaign.

== Medieval to early modern ==
Guerrilla warfare was practiced by the Byzantine Empire, particularly during its wars with the Abbasid Caliphate. In the middle of the tenth century these practices were codified in a military manual known by the modern Latin translation of its Greek title, De velitatione bellica. Ascribed to the emperor Nikephoros II Phokas, this manual describes the tactics employed along the Tauros Mountains, the border region between empire and caliphate. The tactics focus on tracking invaders, limiting the damage that they can do through careful surveillance and counter-raids, and then attacking them in mountain passes when they are laden with pillage and prisoners. Shadowing enemy forces and setting up ambushes are the main themes of the text.

During the Mongol invasion of Europe, guerrilla warfare and stiff resistance helped many Europeans, particularly those at Croatia and Dzurdzuketia, in preventing the Mongols from setting a permanent hold of their territory and driving them off. In the 15th century, Vietnamese leader Lê Lợi launched a guerrilla war against the Chinese.

One of the most successful guerrilla wars was led by George Kastrioti Skanderbeg against the invading Ottoman Empire. In 1443 he rallied Albanian forces and drove the Turks from his homeland. Skanderbeg fought a guerrilla war against invading armies up to 20 times larger than his, by using the mountainous terrain to his advantage. He harassed the vast Ottoman army with small "hit and run" units, as well as using feint retreats followed by sudden counterattacks, and other tactics unknown in warfare up to then. For 25 years Skanderbeg kept the Turks from retaking Albania, which due to its proximity to Italy, could easily have served as a springboard to the rest of Europe.

In 1462, the Ottomans were driven back by Wallachian prince Vlad III Dracula. Vlad was unable to stop the Turks from entering Wallachia, so he resorted to guerrilla war, constantly organizing small attacks and ambushes on the Turks. During The Deluge in Poland guerrilla tactics were applied. In the Hundred Years' War between England and France, commander Bertrand du Guesclin used guerrilla tactics to pester the English invaders.

Gonzalo Fernández de Córdoba, known as the Great Captain, learned guerrilla warfare from skirmishing against Moors in the Granada War and applied it successfully during the Italian Wars. He trained his Italian troops on it. His successors in the Spanish armies, such as Prospero Colonna, Fernando d'Ávalos and Antonio de Leyva, also made a wide usage of guerrilla warfare during the subsequent Italian Wars. It became a common fixture of the Spanish tercios founded by Emperor Charles V. Their tactics included hit and run attacks, ambushes and camisados, which saw wide usage during the Eighty Years' War.

The Frisian warlord and freedom fighter Pier Gerlofs Donia fought a guerrilla against Philip I of Castile and with his co-commander Wijerd Jelckama against Charles V.

During the Dutch Revolt of the 16th century, the Geuzen waged a guerrilla war against the Spanish Empire. During the Northern Wars, a pro-Danish guerrilla group known as the Snapphane fought against the Swedes.

Chhatrapati Shivaji Maharaj pioneered Shiva sutra or Ganimi Kava (guerrilla tactics) against the Mughals and other powers in 1645 leading to the establishment of the Maratha state in 1674, sowing seeds of what would become the last major Indian empire, the Maratha Empire, before the British Raj.

In the 17th century Ireland, Irish irregulars called tories and rapparees used guerrilla warfare in the Irish Confederate Wars and the Williamite War in Ireland. Finnish guerrillas, sissis, fought against Russian occupation troops in the Great Northern War, 1710–1721. The Russians retaliated brutally against the civilian populace; the period is called Isoviha (Grand Hatred) in Finland.

== Long 18th century (1700–1815) ==
=== North America Colonial Wars ===
In North America, one of the earliest recorded instances of guerrilla warfare was Apalachee resistance to the Spanish during the Narváez expedition in 1528 in Spanish Florida.

In the mid 17th century the Colonists of New France were in conflict with the Iroquois Confederacy. Iroquois forces used hit and run tactics, harassment and avoided costly pitched battles. The colonists of New France began calling these Indian tactics La Petite Guerre because the tactics were meant for raiding as opposed to pitched battles. Under the tutelage of Wendake, Wobanaki, Algonquin and Ottawa tutors the habitants of New France learned La Petite Guerre and successfully used them against the Iroquois.

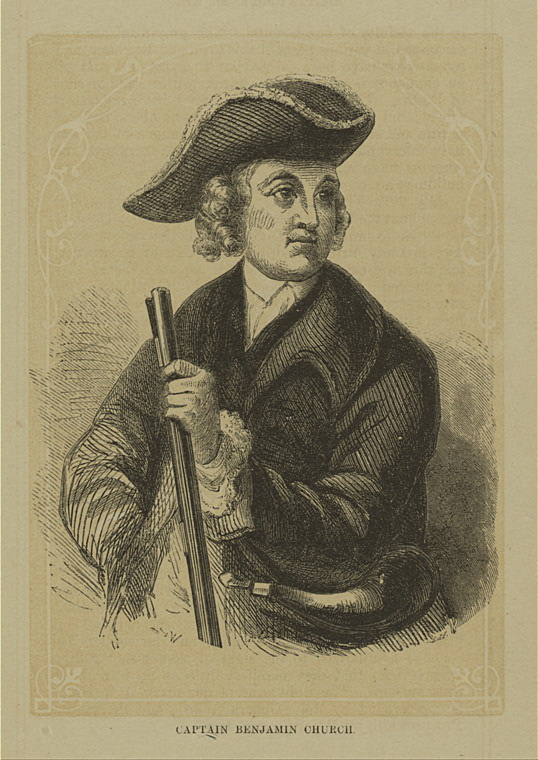
Colonel Benjamin Church (1639–1718) from the Plymouth Colony, father of Unconventional warfare, American Ranging, and Rangers

Major Benjamin Church, New Englanders learned guerilla tactics through Native warfare and also had been adopting Indian scouting and raiding tactics since King Philip's War. Throughout the four French and Indian Wars, starting in the late 17th century Canadiens, the Wabanaki Confederacy, and some Acadians brought La Petite Guerre to the New England Colonies and the Ohio Valley. In present-day Maine, Father Sébastien Rale led the Wabanaki Confederacy in a petite guerre along the New England/ Acadia border. A generation later, in Nova Scotia, Father Jean-Louis Le Loutre led the Mi'kmaq and the Acadians in a petite guerre behind Anglo-American lines in the lead up to the last French and Indian War.

During the French and Indian War La Petite Guerre came to the front stage when the Ohio valley Indians defeated the Braddock Expedition near the forks of Ohio in the Battle of the Monongahela. In Nova Scotia, French Officer Charles Deschamps de Boishébert led the Mi'kmaq and the Acadians in a guerrilla war while the British expelled the Acadians from the region. In the Northeast, a New Hampshire backwoodsman, Robert Rogers, began to make a stir in the British Armed Forces establishment for his success using the tactics of the "little war". British military leaders like Jeffery Amherst, John Forbes, and Henry Bouquet understood they needed to learn and adopt the techniques and tactics of the little war or be consumed, like Braddock. The British military establishment began adopting some of the tactics of La Petite Guerre as "light infantry."

=== American Revolution ===
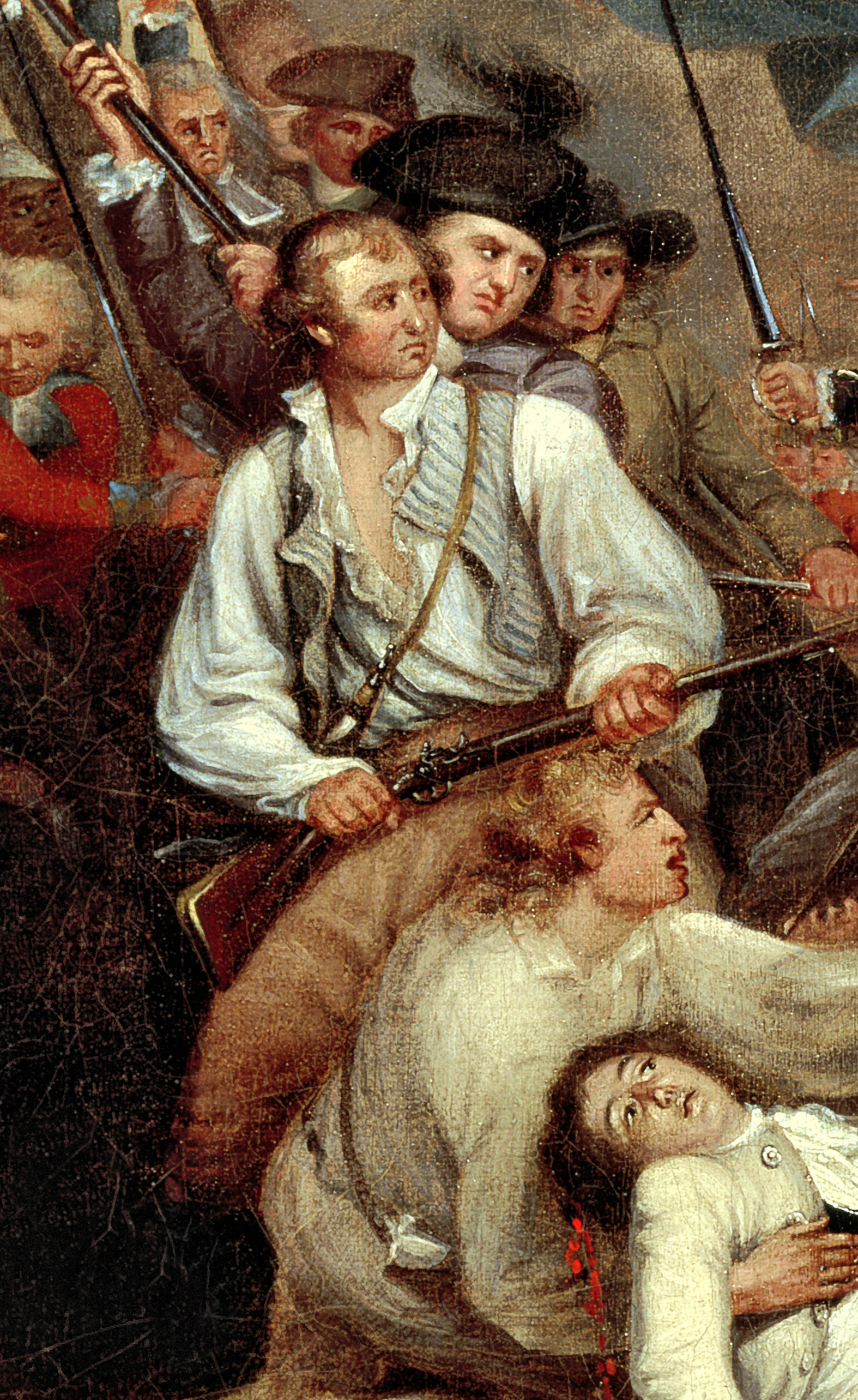
Thomas Knowlton led Knowlton's Rangers in the Continental Army.

Although many of the engagements of the American Revolution were conventional, guerrilla warfare was used to a certain extent during this conflict from 1775 to 1783, which made a significant impact. Guerrilla tactics were first used in the US at the Battles of Lexington and Concord by the Patriots at April 19, 1775. George Washington sometimes used some sort of unconventional methods to fight the British. During the Forage War, George Washington sent militia units with limited Continental Army support to launch raids and ambushes on British Army detachments and forage parties, the militia, and Continental Army support would skirmish with British detachments in small-scale battles and engagements. Throughout the Forage War, British casualties exceeded past 900. The Forage War raised morale for the Patriots as their guerrilla operations against the British were very effective.

Next, there are other Americans that used hit and run raids, ambushes, and surprise attacks against the British. Several famous Colonial American officers had success with guerrilla tactics notably William R. Davie, John Stark, David Wooster, Thomas Knowlton, Francis Marion, Israel Putnam, Shadrach Inman, Ethan Allen, Daniel Morgan, Morgan's Corps of Rangers riflemen, and the Overmountain Men. All these American guerrilla fighters did their part by using unconventional tactics to fight the British and loyalists. Nathanael Greene used a guerrilla strategy very effectively against Lord Cornwallis. First, Nathanael Greene would keep retreating to lure the British far from their supply lines, then send out his forces to fight in small skirmishes and engagements with British detachments to weaken them.

Then fighting the conventional battle, Nathanael Greene fought Lord Cornwallis at Guilford Court House and gave him a severe blow. Although Lord Cornwallis was the victor, his victory was pyrrhic as he had too many casualties that he could ill afford. After the British surrender at Yorktown and America gaining their independence, many of these Americans who used guerrilla tactics and strategies became immortalized and romanticized as time passed. Although guerrilla warfare was frequently used when avoiding battles, the Americans fought in conventional linear formations in decisive battles against the British. The American Revolution could be seen as a hybrid war since both conventional and guerrilla warfare was used throughout its duration.

=== Vendéan Counter-Revolution ===
From 1793 to 1796 a revolt broke out against the French Revolution by Catholic royalists in the Department of the Vendée. This movement was intended to oppose the persecution endured by the Roman Catholic Church in revolutionary France (see Dechristianisation of France during the French Revolution#The Revolution and the Church) and ultimately to restore the monarchy. Though ill-equipped and untrained in conventional military tactics, the Vendéan counter-revolution, known as the "Royal Catholic Army," relied heavily on guerrilla tactics, taking full advantage of their intimate knowledge of the marsh filled, heavily forested countryside. Though the Revolt in the Vendée was eventually "pacified" by government troops, their successes against the larger, better equipped republican army were notable.

=== 2nd Pazhassi War, India ===
The Second Pazhassi War (1800–1805) was a conflict launched by Pazhassi Raja against Company rule in Wayanad and Malabar. Known for his expertise in guerrilla warfare, he strategically used the dense forests and hills to launch surprise attacks on the British. He was supported by the Kurichiya and Kuruma tribal warriors, skilled in archery and hunting, who played a crucial role in the rebellion. The conflict arose after the East India Company imposed heavy taxes through Raja's uncle, Vira Varma, violating a prior agreement. In response, Pazhassi Raja mobilized his forces and waged a prolonged struggle against British rule. The rugged terrain, including a recently discovered cave in Cherambadi, Nilgiris, served as a strategic hideout during the war. Despite initial British setbacks, they launched a massive campaign to defeat Raja's forces.

After years of fierce fighting, Pazhassi Raja was ultimately surrounded and killed on November 30, 1805, at Mavila Thodu near the Kerala-Karnataka border. His defiance against colonial rule made him one of the earliest freedom fighters in India's history. The British, despite superior firepower, struggled against his guerrilla tactics, proving the effectiveness of indigenous resistance. Pazhassi Raja's rebellion is remembered as a symbol of early resistance against foreign domination. He was honored with the title “Kerala Simham” (Lion of Kerala) for his bravery and leadership in battle.

=== Australian frontier wars ===
The Hawkesbury and Nepean Wars (1790–1816), the first of the Australian frontier wars, were a series of conflicts between the New South Wales Corps and the Indigenous Australians of the Hawkesbury river and Nepean river in Sydney, Australia. The local Darug people raided farms until Governor Lachlan Macquarie dispatched troops from the 46th Regiment of Foot in 1816. They were fought using mostly guerrilla-warfare tactics; however, several conventional battles also took place. Indigenous Australians led by Pemulwuy, a resistance leader, also conducted raids around Parramatta, a western suburb in Sydney, during the period between 1795 and 1802. These attacks led Governor Philip Gidley King to issue an order in 1801 which authorized settlers to shoot Indigenous Australians on sight in Parramatta, Georges River and Prospect areas. The wars resulted in the defeat of the Hawkesbury River and Nepean river Indigenous clans who were subsequently dispossessed of their lands.

=== Napoleonic Wars ===
"Wherever we arrived, they disappeared, whenever we left, they arrived — they were everywhere and nowhere, they had no tangible center which could be attacked."

— Prussian officer during the Peninsular War, while fighting with French regulars against Spanish guerrillas

In the Napoleonic Wars many of the armies lived off the land. This often led to some resistance by the local population if the army did not pay fair prices for products they consumed. Usually, this resistance was sporadic, and not very successful, so it is not classified as guerrilla action. There are three notable exceptions, though:

- The rebellion of 1809 in Tirol led by Andreas Hofer.

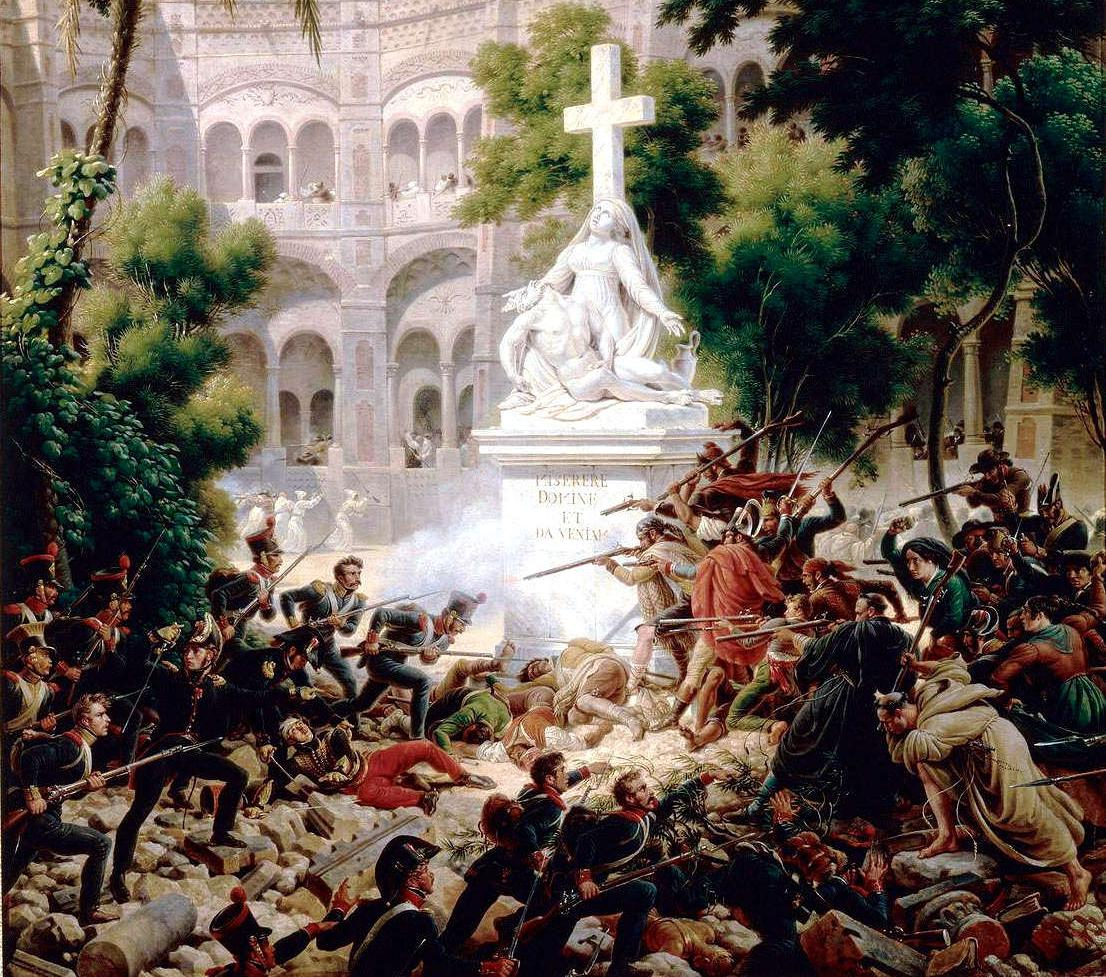
Siege of Saragossa: The assault on the San Engracia monastery

==== Napoleon's invasion of Russia ====
In Napoleon's invasion of Russia of 1812 two actions could be seen as initiating guerrilla tactics. The burning of Moscow after it had been occupied by Napoleon's Grand Army, depriving the French of shelter in the city, resembled guerrilla action insofar as it was an attack on the available resources rather than directly on the troops (and insofar as it was a Russian action rather than an inadvertent consequence of nineteenth-century troops' camping in a largely abandoned city of wooden buildings). In a different sense, the imperial command that the Russian serfs should attack the French resembled guerrilla tactics in its reliance on partisans rather than army regulars. This did not so much spark a guerrilla war as encourage a revengeful slaughter of French deserters by Russian peasants. Meanwhile, Fieldmarshal Mikhail Kutuzov permitted than-Hussar Lieutenant-Colonel Denis Davydov to open the Partisan War against the French communications. Davydov, Seslavin, Figner and others are since known in Russia as the 'Partisan Rangers of the Year '12' (Russian: Партизаны [Отечественной войны 18] '12-го года). They were successful in their operations making the French troops unable to fight or even move, because of food and ammunition shortage, and not just because of the Russian Winter as is usually stated.

==== Peninsular War ====
The Third of May 1808 by Francisco Goya, showing Spanish resisters being executed by Napoleon's troops

In the Peninsular War Spanish and Portuguese guerrillas tied down hundreds of thousands of French Imperial Army troops and killed tens of thousands. The continual losses of troops caused Napoleon to describe this conflict as his "Spanish ulcer". This was one of the most successful partisan wars in history and was where the word guerrilla was first used in this context. The Oxford English Dictionary lists Wellington as the oldest known source, speaking of "Guerrillas" in 1809. Poet William Wordsworth showed an early insight into guerrilla methods in his 1809 pamphlet on the Convention of Cintra:

It is manifest that, though a great army may easily defeat or disperse another army, less or greater, yet it is not in a like degree formidable to a determined people, nor efficient in a like degree to subdue them, or to keep them in subjugation–much less if this people, like those of Spain in the present instance, be numerous, and, like them, inhabit a territory extensive and strong by nature. For a great army, and even several great armies, cannot accomplish this by marching about the country, unbroken, but each must split itself into many portions, and the several detachments become weak accordingly, not merely as they are small in size, but because the soldiery, acting thus, necessarily relinquish much of that part of their superiority, which lies in what may be called the engineer of war; and far more, because they lose, in proportion as they are broken, the power of profiting by the military skill of the Commanders, or by their own military habits. The experienced soldier is thus brought down nearer to the plain ground of the inexperienced, man to the level of man: and it is then, that the truly brave man rises, the man of good hopes and purposes; and superiority in moral brings with it superiority in physical power.

— William Wordsworth, Selected Prose (1988), Penguin Classics, pp. 177–178.

This war saw British and Portuguese forces using Portugal as a secure position to launch campaigns against the French army, while Spanish guerrilleros bled the occupiers. Gates notes that much of the French army "was rendered unavailable for operations against Wellington because innumerable Spanish contingents kept materialising all over the country. In 1810, for example, when Massena invaded Portugal, the Imperial forces in the Peninsula totaled a massive 325,000 men, but only about one quarter of these could be spared for the offensive – the rest were required to contain the Spanish insurgents and regulars. This was the greatest single contribution that the Spaniards were to make and, without it, Wellington could not have maintained himself on the continent for long—let alone emerge victorious from the conflict". Combined, the regular and irregular allied forces prevented Napoleon's Marshals from subduing the rebellious Spanish provinces.

==== War of 1812 ====
Although a great number of engagements were conventional, unconventional warfare was used to a certain extent by the Americans in their second conflict with the British Empire. This war has been a controversial between historians and scholars. However, it cannot be denied that some guerrilla actions did take place and were expertly used by the Americans. The Americans used forms of unconventional warfare, such as, raiding, hit and run incursions, surprise attacks, and sometimes ambushes. The three commanders of the Regiment of Riflemen were fairly competent in some limited unconventional types of warfare against the British Empire such as Benjamin Forsyth, Daniel Appling, and Ludowick Morgan. Other Americans that used hit and run raids plus surprise incursions were Duncan McArthur, Alexander Smyth, Andrew Holmes, Daniel Bissell, John B. Campbell, and George McGlassin.

The United States however, also had amphibious like combatants that could be seen as 'guerrillas of the sea'. These were either United States Navy commanders or privateers that raided British merchant shipping. The privateers were able to raid the British ships by raising British colors to surprise and capture British ships, or disguise one's ship as a harmless looking vessel with hidden riflemen to ambush/surprise unsuspecting British ships. These Americans were Melancthon Taylor Woolsey, Otway Burns, Thomas Boyle, David Porter, Jesse Elliot, John Percival, John Ordronaux, and William Josephus Stafford. Next, the American militia which were famous for their forms of guerrilla warfare in the American Revolution were not used so effectively in the War of 1812. It has been reported that the militia were poorly utilized as conventional troops, poorly armed, underfunded, and poorly trained which made them significantly less effective than their American Revolutionary counter-parts. Because of these conditions, the American militia was given a poor status, therefore they could only do so little damage. However, if used carefully in a sophisticated way, they could have been effective guerrilla fighters.

One of the most notable commanders to use the guerrilla tactics effectively was Alexander Macomb. His exploits are mentioned in the book The Battles at Plattsburgh: September 11, 1814 by Keith A. Herkalo. This history book mentions how General Alexander Macomb had the American militia fire at the British from behind trees, rocks, and bushes while retreating or maneuvering around them in the woods during the Battle of Plattsburgh. British and Canadian commanders quoted how the American militia were formidable and did not fight like gentlemen by firing from concealed positions behind trees and rocks. It was said that the American Militia with their guerrilla style fighting in this battle played an important role in America's victory of Plattsburgh. At the end of the war, America gained very little favorable results such as the defeat of their formidable native America foe Tecumseh's Confederacy. America could only fight the British to a draw at the end of this conflict. It's debatable if any of these American combatant's guerrilla-like actions had any impact on the outcome of the war, but they do provide good insight of lessons to be learned for future military commanders and historians yearning to learn the ways of guerrilla tactics and strategy.

== 19th century (1815–1914) ==
=== American Civil War ===
Irregular warfare in the American Civil War followed the patterns of irregular warfare in 19th century Europe. Structurally, irregular warfare can be divided into three different types conducted during the American Civil War: 'People's War', 'partisan warfare', and 'raiding warfare'. The concept of 'People's war,' first described by Carl von Clausewitz in On War, was the closest example of a mass guerrilla movement in the era. In general, this type of irregular warfare was conducted in the hinterland of the Border States (Missouri, Arkansas, Tennessee, Kentucky, and northwestern Virginia), and was marked by a vicious neighbor-against-neighbor conflict. One such example was the opposing irregular forces operating in Missouri and northern Arkansas from 1862 to 1865, most of which were pro-Confederate or pro-Union in name only and preyed on civilians and isolated military forces of both sides with little regard of politics. From these semi-organized guerrillas, several groups formed and were given some measure of legitimacy by their governments. Quantrill's Raiders, who terrorized pro-Union civilians and fought Federal troops in large areas of Missouri and Kansas, was one such unit. Another notorious unit, with debatable ties to the Confederate Army, was led by Champ Ferguson along the Kentucky-Tennessee border. Ferguson became one of the only figures of Confederate cause to be executed after the war. Dozens of other small, localized bands terrorized the countryside throughout the border region during the war, bringing total war to the area that lasted until the end of the Civil War and, in some areas, beyond.

Partisan warfare, in contrast, more closely resembles Commando operations of the 20th century. Partisans were small units of conventional forces, controlled and organized by a military force for operations behind enemy lines. The 1862 Partisan Ranger Act passed by the Confederate Congress authorized the formation of these units and gave them legitimacy, which placed them in a different category than the common 'bushwhacker' or 'guerrilla'. John Singleton Mosby formed a partisan unit which was very effective in tying down Federal forces behind Union lines in northern Virginia in the last two years of the war.

Lastly, deep raids by conventional cavalry forces were often considered 'irregular' in nature. The "Partisan Brigades" of Nathan Bedford Forrest and John Hunt Morgan operated as part of the cavalry forces of the Confederate Army of Tennessee in 1862 and 1863. They were given specific missions to destroy logistical hubs, railroad bridges, and other strategic targets to support the greater mission of the Army of Tennessee. By mid-1863, with the destruction of Morgan's raiders during the Great Raid of 1863, the Confederacy conducted few deep cavalry raids in the latter years of the war, mostly because of the losses in experienced horsemen and the offensive operations of the Union Army. Federal cavalry conducted several successful raids during the war but in general used their cavalry forces in a more conventional role. A good exception was the 1863 Grierson's Raid, which did much to set the stage for General Ulysses S. Grant's victory during the Vicksburg Campaign.

Federal counter-guerrilla operations were very successful in preventing the success of Confederate guerrilla warfare. In Arkansas, Federal forces used a wide variety of strategies to defeat irregulars. These included the use of Arkansas Unionist forces as anti-guerrilla troops, the use of Union Navy riverine forces such as gunboats to control the waterways, and the provost marshal military law enforcement system to spy on suspected guerrillas and to imprison those captured. Against Confederate raiders, the Federal army developed an effective cavalry themselves and reinforced that system by numerous blockhouses and fortification to defend strategic targets.

However, Federal attempts to defeat Mosby's Partisan Rangers fell short of success because of Mosby's use of very small units (10–15 men) operating in areas considered friendly to the Rebel cause. Another regiment known as the "Thomas Legion", consisting of white and anti-Union Cherokee Indians, morphed into a guerrilla force and continued fighting in the remote mountain back-country of western North Carolina for a month after Robert E. Lee's surrender at Appomattox. That unit was never completely suppressed by Union forces, but voluntarily ceased hostilities after capturing the town of Waynesville on May 10, 1865.

In the late 20th century several historians have focused on the non-use of guerrilla warfare to prolong the war. Near the end of the war, there were those in the Confederate government, notably Jefferson Davis who advocated continuing the southern fight as a guerrilla conflict. He was opposed by generals such as Robert E. Lee who ultimately believed that surrender and reconciliation were better than guerrilla warfare.

=== South African War ===
Guerrilla tactics were used extensively by the forces of the Boer republics in the First and Second Boer Wars in South Africa (1880–1881; 1899–1902) against British forces. In the First Boer War, the Boer commandos wore their everyday dull-coloured farming clothes. The Boers relied more on stealth and speed than discipline and formation and, being expert marksmen using smokeless ammunition, the Boer were able to easily snipe at British troops from a distance. So the British relaxed their close-formation tactics. The British Army had changed to Khaki uniforms, first used by the British Indian Army, a decade earlier, and officers were soon ordered to dispense with gleaming buttons and buckles which made them conspicuous to snipers.

In the third phase of the Second Boer War, after the British defeated the Boer armies in conventional warfare and occupied their capitals of Pretoria and Bloemfontein, Boer commandos reverted to mobile warfare. Units led by leaders such as Jan Smuts and Christiaan de Wet harassed slow-moving British columns and attacked railway lines and encampments. The Boers were almost all mounted and possessed long range magazine loaded rifles. This gave them the ability to attack quickly and cause many casualties before retreating rapidly when British reinforcements arrived. In the early period of the guerrilla war, Boer commandos could be very large, containing several thousand men and even field artillery. However, as their supplies of food and ammunition gave out, the Boers increasingly broke up into smaller units and relied on captured British arms, ammunition, and uniforms.

To counter these tactics, the British under Kitchener interned Boer civilians into concentration camps and built hundreds of blockhouses all over the Transvaal and Orange Free State. Kitchener also enacted a scorched earth policy, destroying Boer homes and farms. Eventually, the Boer guerrillas surrendered in 1902, but the British granted them generous terms in order to bring the war to an end. This showed how effective guerrilla tactics could be in extracting concessions from a militarily more powerful enemy.

=== Philippine–American War ===
At the start of the Philippine–American War, even with the recommendation of the able General Antonio Luna, guerrilla warfare strategy was viewed by the Philippine side only as a tactical option of final recourse. This led to subsequent defeat of the First Philippine Republic forces in the early stages of the war mainly due to superior American weaponry and troops. Guerrilla warfare was only used as a main strategy on November 13, 1899, which made American occupation of the Philippine archipelago all the more difficult over the next few years. This can be greatly seen by the Moro Rebellion at the southern province of the Philippines wherein Moro rebels will conceal themselves in the thick Philippine jungle and will charge American troops with only bolo knives in overwhelming numbers at the opportune time. These led the American weapons manufacturers to develop the famed M1911 pistol.

=== War of the Pacific ===
During the War of the Pacific (1879–1883) the Peruvian Army General Andres Avelino Caceres fought a three-year guerrilla war against the victorious Chilean Army in the Andean Region of Peru from 1881 to 1883 (La Breña Campaign); this campaign was later studied in the Austrian Theresian Military Academy as an excellent illustration of successful mountain warfare.

=== Mexican Revolution ===
In the Mexican Revolution from 1910 to 1920, the populist revolutionary leader Emiliano Zapata employed the use of predominantly guerrilla tactics. His forces, composed entirely of peasant farmers turned soldiers, wore no uniform and would easily blend into the general population after an operation's completion. They would have young soldiers, called "dynamite boys", hurl cans filled with explosives into enemy barracks, and then a large number of lightly armed soldiers would emerge from the surrounding area to attack it. Although Zapata's Liberation Army of the South met considerable success, his strategy backfired as government troops, unable to distinguish his soldiers from the civilian population, waged a broad and brutal campaign against the latter.

=== Brigandage in south Italy ===
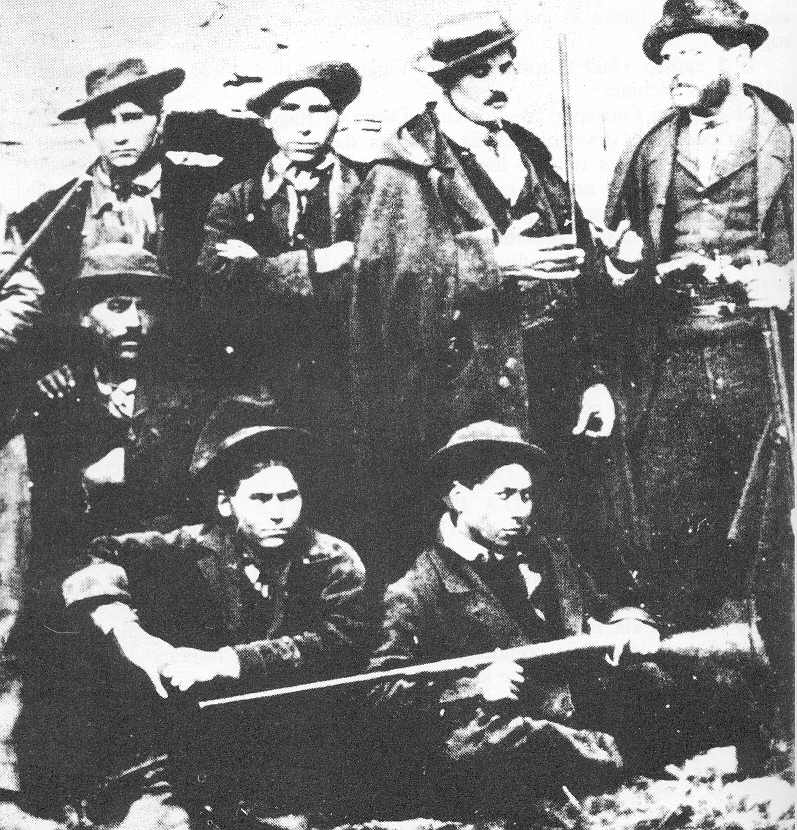
Band of south Italian brigands in Basilicata, during the Italian unification

After the Italian unification in 1860, many bands composed mainly by peasants emerged in Southern Italy. The sources of the trouble were the carelessness of the new government toward the problems of the southern laborers, higher taxes and higher prices of basic necessities, mandatory military service who subtracted youths from the workforce and the economical benefits reserved only for the bourgeois society. In this period thousands of poor people took the way of brigandage. The most well known brigand was Carmine Crocco, a former soldier in the service of Giuseppe Garibaldi who formed an army of two thousand men. Crocco was renowned for his guerrilla tactics, which were enhanced by the same royal soldiers who chased him. His warfare included cutting water supplies, destroying flour-mills, cutting telegraph wires and ambushing stragglers.

=== Others ===
- In 1848, both The Nation and The United Irishman advocated guerrilla warfare to overthrow English rule in Ireland, though no actual warfare took place.
- The Poles and Lithuanians used guerrilla warfare during the January Uprising of 1863–1865, against the Russian Empire.
- In the 19th century, peoples of the Balkans used guerrilla tactics to fight the Ottoman Empire.
- the North African Muslim uprisings against the colonial powers after World War II.
- guerrilla warfare tactics were first applied in India by Sher Shah Suri or even before the Khuwar zam Shah against the Mongol.
- During the early stages of the Franco-Prussian War, the Francs-tireurs conducted guerrilla warfare against the occupying Prussian Army.

== World Wars (1914–1945) ==
=== Irish War of Independence and Civil War ===
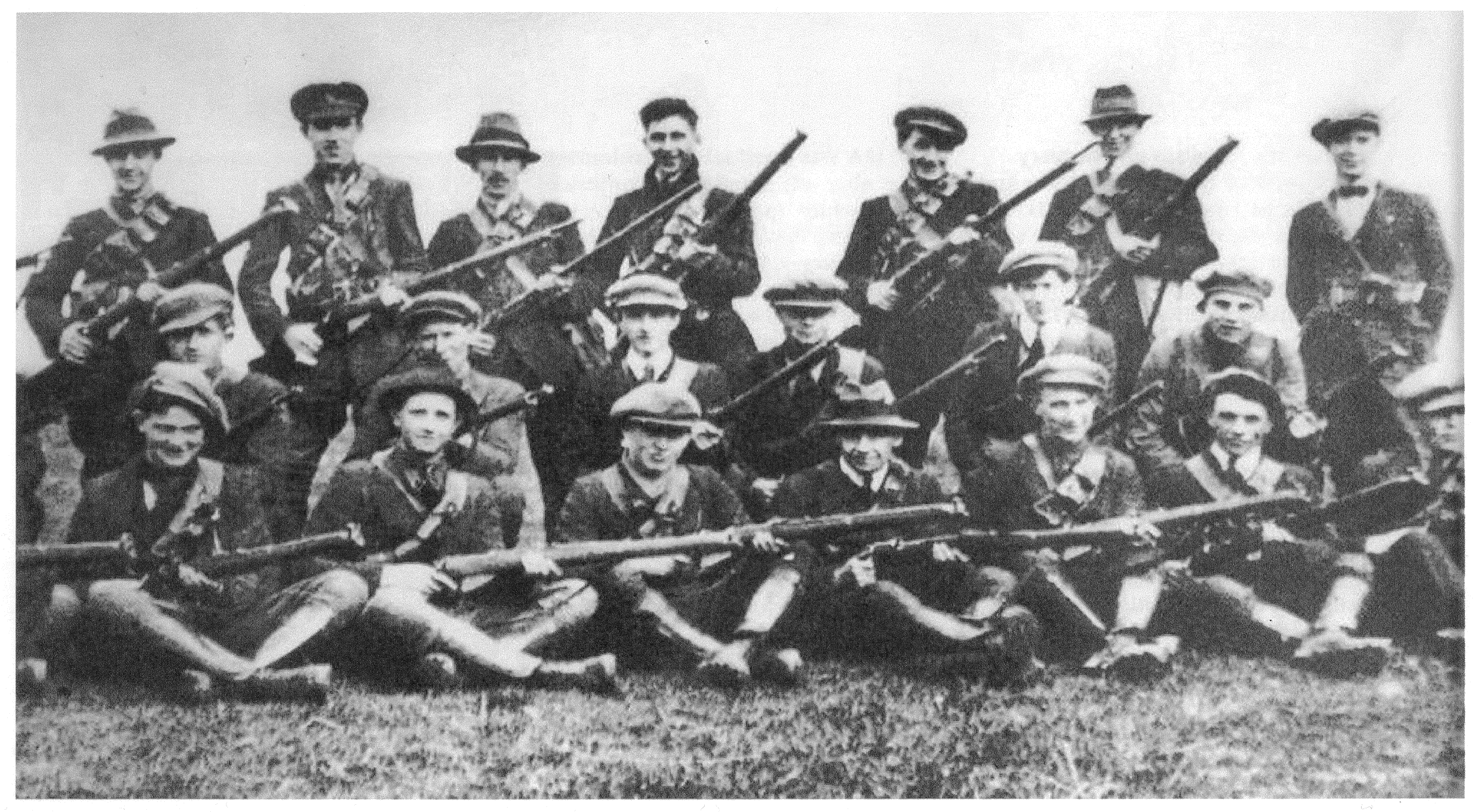
IRA Flying Column during the Irish War of Independence

The wars between Ireland and the British state have been long, and over the centuries have covered the full spectrum of the types of warfare. The Irish fought the first successful 20th century war of independence against the British Empire and the United Kingdom. After the military failure of the Easter Rising in 1916, the Irish Republican Army (IRA) used guerrilla tactics involving both urban guerrilla warfare and flying columns in the countryside during the Irish War of Independence of 1919 to 1922. Many were inspired by the fabled exploits of the 1799–1803 guerilla campaign by Michael Dwyer after the failed 1798 rebellion.

The chief IRA commanders in the localities during this period were Tom Barry, Séumas Robinson, Liam Lynch, Seán Mac Eoin, and Tom Maguire.

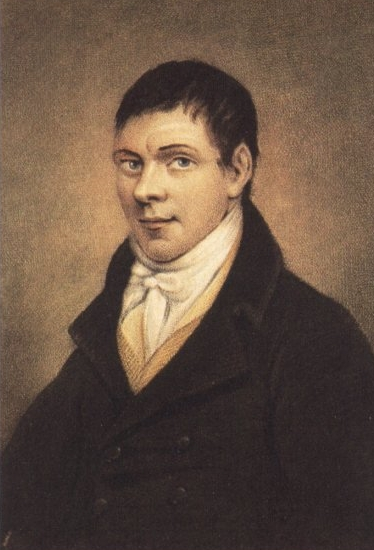
Michael Dwyer

The IRA guerrilla was of considerable intensity in parts of the country, notably in Dublin and in areas such as County Cork, County Kerry and County Mayo in the south and west. Despite this, the Irish fighters were never in a position to either hold territory or take on British forces in a conventional manner. Even the largest engagements of the conflict, such as the Kilmichael Ambush or Crossbarry Ambush constituted mere skirmishes by the standards of a conventional war. Another aspect of the war, particularly in the north-eastern part of the province of Ulster, was communal violence. The Unionist majority there, who were largely Protestant and loyal to Britain were granted control over the security forces there, in particular the Ulster Special Constabulary and used them to attack the Nationalist (and largely Catholic) population in reprisal for IRA actions. Elsewhere in Ireland, where Unionists were in a minority, they were sometimes attacked by the IRA for aiding the British forces. The extent to which the conflict was an inter-communal one as well as war of national liberation is still strongly debated in Ireland. The total death toll in the war came to a little over 2000 people.

By mid-1921, the military and political costs of maintaining the British security forces in Ireland eventually proved too heavy for the British government. In July 1921, the Government of the United Kingdom agreed to a truce with the IRA and agreed to meet representatives of the Irish First Dail, who since the 1918 general election held 73 of the 105 parliamentary seats for the island. Negotiations led to a settlement, the Anglo-Irish Treaty. It created the Irish Free State of 26 counties as a dominion within the British Empire; the other 6 counties remained part of the UK as Northern Ireland.

Sinn Féin and the Irish Republican Army split into pro- and anti-Treaty factions with the Anti-Treaty IRA forces losing the Irish Civil War (1922–23) which followed. The partition of Ireland laid the seeds for the later Troubles. The Irish Civil War is a striking example of the failure of guerrilla tactics when used against a relatively popular native regime. Following their failure to hold fixed positions against an Irish Free State offensive in the summer of 1922, the IRA re-formed "flying columns" and attempted to use the same tactics they had successfully used against the British. However, against Irish troops, who knew them and the terrain and faced with the hostility of the Roman Catholic Church and the majority of Irish nationalist opinion, they were unable to sustain their campaign. In addition, the Free State government, confident of its legitimacy among the Irish population, sometimes used more ruthless and effective measures of repression than the British had felt able to employ. Whereas the British executed 14 IRA men in 1919–1922, the Free State executed 77 anti-treaty prisoners officially and its troops killed another 150 prisoners or so in the field (see Executions during the Irish Civil War). The Free State also interned 12,000 Republicans, compared with the British figure of 4,500. The last anti-Treaty guerrillas abandoned their military campaign against the Free State after nine months in March 1923.

=== World War I ===
In a successful campaign in German East Africa, the Imperial German Army commander Paul Emil von Lettow-Vorbeck fought against the numerically superior allied forces. Even though he was cut off from Germany and had few Germans under his command (most of his fighters were African askaris), he won multiple victories during the East Africa Campaign and managed to exhaust and trouble the Allies; he was undefeated up until his acceptance of a cease-fire in Northern Rhodesia three days after the end of the war in Europe. He returned to Germany as a hero.

Major guerrilla war was fought by the Arabs against the Ottoman Turks during the Arab Revolt (1916–1918). Attacking the Hejaz Railway to disrupt the Ottoman Army is a strategy often credited to the British officer T. E. Lawrence.

Another guerrilla war opposed the German Occupation of Ukraine in 1918 and partisan and guerrilla forces fought against both the Bolsheviks and the Whites during the Russian Civil War. This fighting continued into 1921 in Ukraine, in Tambov province, and in parts of Siberia. Other guerrillas opposed the Japanese occupation of the Russian Far East.

=== Second Sino-Japanese War ===
Despite a common misconception, both Nationalist and Communist forces maintained active underground resistance in Japanese-occupied areas during the Second Sino-Japanese War. Even before the outbreak of total war in 1937, partisans were already present in Manchuria hampering Japan's occupation of the region. After the initial phases of the war, when large swaths of the North China Plain rapidly fell to the Japanese, underground resistance, supported by either Communist sympathizers or composed of disguised National Revolutionary Army soldiers, would soon rise up to combat the garrison forces. They were quite successful, able to sabotage railroad routes and ambush reinforcements. Many major campaigns, such as the four failed invasions of Changsha, were caused by overly-stretched supply lines, lack of reinforcements, and ambushes by irregulars. The Communist cells, many having decades of prior experience in guerrilla warfare against the Nationalists, usually fared much better, and many Nationalist underground groups were subsequently absorbed into Communist ones. Usually, in Japanese-occupied areas, the Imperial Japanese Army only controlled the cities and railroad routes, with most of the countryside either left alone or with active guerrilla presence. The People's Republic of China has emphasized their contribution to the Chinese war effort, going as far to say that in addition to an "overt theatre", which in many cases they deny was effective, there was also a "covert theatre", which they claim did much to stop the Japanese advance.

=== World War II ===
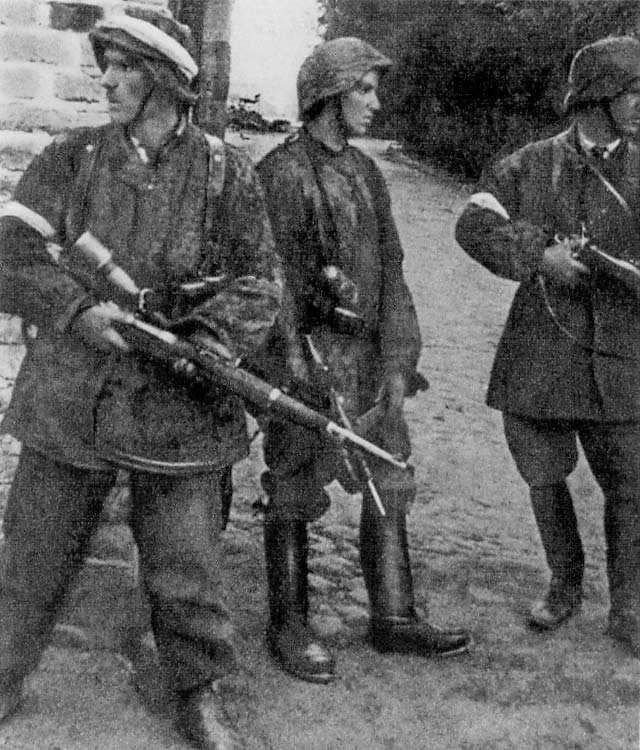
Polish guerrillas from Batalion Zośka dressed in stolen German uniforms and armed with stolen weapons, fighting in the Warsaw Uprising, the largest anti-Nazi guerrilla warfare in Europe

Many clandestine organizations (often known as resistance movements) operated in the countries occupied by German Reich during the Second World War. These organizations began forming as early as 1939 when, after the defeat of Poland, the members of what would become the Polish Home Army began to gather. In March 1940, a partisan unit of the first guerrilla commanders in the Second World War in Europe under Major Henryk Dobrzański "Hubal" completely destroyed a battalion of German infantry in a skirmish near the village of Huciska.

A guerrilla movement in Ethiopia was formed to rout out Italian forces as early as 1935. Other clandestine organizations operated in Denmark, Belgium, Norway, France (Resistance), France (Maquis), Czechoslovakia, Slovakia, Yugoslavia (Royalist Chetniks), Yugoslavia (Partisans), Soviet Union, Italy, Albania and Greece. From the second half of 1944, the total forces of the Yugoslav Partisans numbered over 500,000 men organized in four field armies, which engaged in conventional warfare. By 1944 the Polish resistance was thought to number 600,000. Many of these organizations received help from the British operated Special Operations Executive (SOE) which along with the commandos was initiated by Winston Churchill to "set Europe ablaze." The SOE was originally designated as 'Section D' of MI6 but its aid to resistance movements to start fires clashed with MI6's primary role as an intelligence-gathering agency. When Britain was under threat of invasion, SOE trained Auxiliary Units to conduct guerrilla warfare in the event of invasion. Even the Home Guard were trained in guerrilla warfare in the case of invasion of England.

Osterley Park was the first of three such schools established to train the Home Guard. Not only did SOE help the resistance to tie down many German units as garrison troops, so directly aiding the conventional war effort, but also guerrilla incidents in occupied countries were useful in the propaganda war, helping to repudiate German claims that the occupied countries were pacified and broadly on the side of the Germans. Despite these minor successes, many historians believe that the efficacy of the European resistance movements has been greatly exaggerated in popular novels, films and other media.

Contrary to popular belief, in the Western and Southern Europe the resistance groups were only able to seriously counter the German in areas that offered the protection of rugged terrain. In relatively flat, open areas, such as France, the resistance groups were all too vulnerable to decimation by German regulars and pro-German collaborators. Only when operating in concert with conventional Allied units were the resistance groups to prove indispensable.

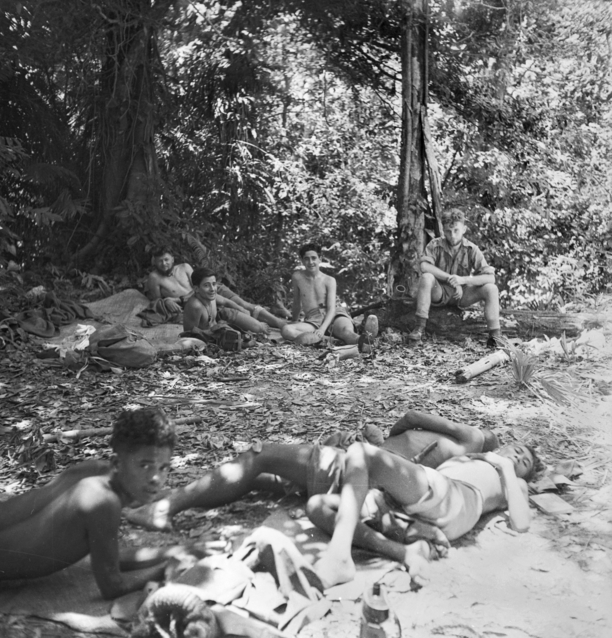
Australian guerillas during the Battle of Timor

All the clandestine resistance movements and organizations in the occupied Europe were dwarfed by the partisan warfare that took place on the vast scale of the Eastern Front combat between Soviet partisans and the German Reich forces. The strength of the partisan units and formations cannot be accurately estimated, but in Belorussia alone is thought to have been in excess of 300,000. This was a planned and closely coordinated effort by the STAVKA which included insertion of officers and delivery of equipment, as well as coordination of operational planning with the regular Red Army forces such as Operation Concert in 1943 (commenced 19 September) and the massive sabotage of German logistics in preparation for commencement of Operation Bagration in the summer of 1944.

Guerrilla tactics were employed in the war in the Pacific as well. When Japanese forces invaded the island of Timor on 20 February 1942, they were resisted by a small, under-equipped force of Allied military personnel—known as Sparrow Force—predominantly from Australia, United Kingdom, and the Netherlands East Indies. Although Portugal was not a combatant, many East Timorese civilians and some Portuguese colonists fought with the Allies as guerrillas (criados), or provided food, shelter and other assistance. Some Timorese continued a resistance campaign following the Australian withdrawal.

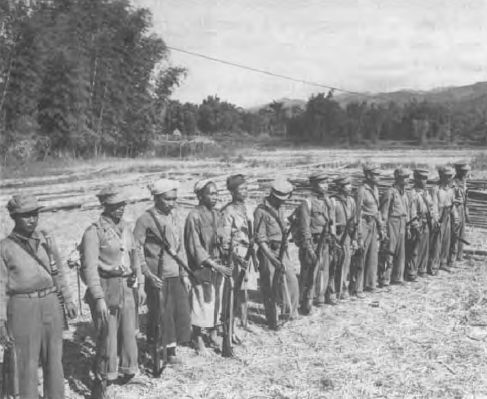
Squad of Kachin Rangers employed by the U.S. Army as guerilla fighters in Burma

When the United States entered the war, the US Office of Strategic Services (OSS) co-operated and enhanced the work of SOE as well as working on its own initiatives in the Far East. Colonel Wendell Fertig in 1942 organized a large guerrilla force which harassed the Japanese occupation forces on the Philippine Island of Mindanao all the way up to the liberation of the Philippines in 1945. After the surrender of Bataan and Corregidor which was the last organized resistance against the Imperial Japanese Army, Filipino guerillas fought the Japanese throughout the war and became a very important force during the liberation of the Philippines. The exploits of these American commanders and Filipino guerillas influenced the later formation of the United States Green Berets.

Others included Col. Aaron Bank, Col. Russell Volckmann, and Col. William R. Peers. Volckmann commanded a guerrilla force which operated out of the Cordillera of Northern Luzon in the Philippines from the beginning of World War II to its conclusion. He remained in radio contact with US Forces, prior to the invasion of Lingayen Gulf. Peers, who later became a general, commanded OSS Detachment 101 in Burma. Because it was never larger than a few hundred Americans, it relied on support from various Burmese tribal groups. In particular, the vigorously anti-Japanese Kachin people were vital to the unit's success.

The Chindits – officially in 1943 77th Indian Infantry Brigade and in 1944 3rd Indian Infantry Division – were a British India "Special Force" that served in Burma and India in 1943 and 1944 during the Burma Campaign. They were formed to put into effect Orde Wingate's newly developed guerilla warfare tactic of long range penetration.

The Japanese military themselves also used guerrilla warfare during the later part of the Pacific War, when Japan's resource was already dwindling and the Allies have started invading. Tadamichi Kuribayashi famously used guerrilla warfare during the Battle of Iwo Jima, where the general used network of tunnels and caves to attack American forces. His tactic was somewhat successful, delaying the Americans from taking Iwo Jima for 36 days. The same tactic was used during the Battle of Okinawa.

== Cold War era (1945–1990) ==
=== Baltic anti-soviet campaigns ===
After World War II, during the 1940s and 1950s, thousands of fighters in Estonia, Latvia and Lithuania (see Forest Brothers, Latvian national partisans, Lithuanian partisans (1944–1953)) participated in unsuccessful guerrilla warfare against Soviet occupation. In Lithuania, guerrilla warfare was massive until 1958. The last fighter in Estonia was discovered and killed in 1978.

=== Israel ===
European Jews fleeing from anti-Semitic violence (especially Russian pogroms) immigrated in increasing numbers to Palestine. When the British restricted Jewish immigration to the region (see White Paper of 1939), Jewish immigrants began to use guerrilla warfare against the British for two purposes: to bring in more Jewish refugees from German-occupied Europe, and to turn the tide of British sentiment at home. Jewish groups such as the Lehi and the Irgun carried out a campaign of acts of terror and sabotage against British rule. Among these attacks was the 1946 King David Hotel bombing carried out by the Irgun which killed 91 people. The Lehi and Irgun were amalgamated into the Israel Defense Forces and subsequently fought in the 1948 Arab–Israeli War.

=== Second Indochina War ===
==== Within South Vietnam ====
Within the United States, the Vietnam War is commonly thought of as a guerrilla war. However, this is a simplification of a much more complex situation which followed the pattern outlined by Maoist theory.

The National Liberation Front (NLF), drawing its ranks from the South Vietnamese peasantry and working class, used guerrilla tactics in the early phases of the war. However, by 1965 when U.S. involvement escalated, the National Liberation Front was in the process of being supplanted by regular units of the North Vietnamese Army.

The NVA regiments organized along traditional military lines, were supplied via the Ho Chi Minh trail rather than living off the land, and had access to weapons such as tanks and artillery which are not normally used by guerrilla forces. Furthermore, parts of North Vietnam were "off-limits" by American bombardment for political reasons, giving the NVA personnel and their material a haven that does not usually exist for a guerrilla army.

Over time, more of the fighting was conducted by the North Vietnamese Army and the character of the war become increasingly conventional. The final offensive into South Vietnam in 1975 was a mostly conventional military operation in which guerrilla warfare played a minor, supporting role.

The Cu Chi Tunnels (Ðịa đạo Củ Chi) was a major base for guerrilla warfare during the Vietnam War. Located about 60 km northwest of Saigon (Ho Chi Minh City), the Viet Cong (NLF) used the complex system tunnels to hide and live during the day and come up to fight at night.

Throughout the Vietnam War, the Communist Party of Vietnam closely supervised all levels of the conflict. The bulk of the VC/NLF were initially southerners, with some distinctive southern issues and sensibilities. Nevertheless, the VC/NLF was associated with the Northern Lao Dong Party which furnished it with supplies, weaponry and trained cadres, including regular NVA/PAVN troops. The Southern Communist party, the Peoples Revolutionary Party (PRP) organized in 1962, to participate in the insurgency, and COVSN, Central Office for Southern Vietnam, which partially controlled military activity.

This is a set of tactics which were used frequently in the Vietnam War by the NVA.

==== Within Laos ====
The Central Intelligence Agency raised a guerrilla army to oppose PAVN invaders of the Kingdom of Laos. Consisting principally Hmong hill tribesmen, L'Armee Clandestine under General Vang Pao was the only guerrilla army to ever enjoy air supremacy. It fought the Vietnamese regulars from 1961 to 1975 before reduced numbers and dwindling American support led to their defeat.

=== Soviet invasion of Afghanistan ===
The Soviet invasion of Afghanistan started with a rapid takeover of the major cities but then turned into a decade-long guerilla resistance. The Afghan side was a collection of tribes who initially fought with obsolete weapons such as rifles from the 19th century or the First World War. The resistance fighters were known collectively as the Mujahideen. The United States and United Kingdom started to support the Afghanistan resistance with gradually more potent weapons and eventually anti-tank and anti-aircraft missiles which then would cause so much damage to the far larger Soviet Armed Forces that the Soviet Union abandoned its occupation and retreated back to the Soviet Union.

=== Bangladesh Liberation War ===
Mukti Bahini (Bengali: মুক্তি বাহিনী "Liberation Army") collectively refers to the armed organizations who fought against the Pakistan Army during the Bangladesh Liberation War. It was dynamically formed by (mostly) Bengali regulars and civilians after the proclamation of independence for Bangladesh (formerly East Pakistan) on March 26, 1971. Subsequently, by mid-April 1971 the former members of East Pakistan armed forces formed the "Bangladesh Armed Forces" and M. A. G. Osmani assumed the command of the same. The civilian groups continued to assist the armed forces during the war. After the war "Mukti Bahini" became the general term to refer to all forces (military and civilian) of former East Pakistani origin fighting against the Pakistan Armed Forces during the Bangladesh Liberation War. Often Mukti Bahini operated as an effective guerrilla force to keep their enemies on the run. It has been compared to the French Maquis, the Viet Cong, and the guerrillas of Josip Broz Tito in their tactics and effectiveness.

=== Northern Ireland conflict ===
In the late 1960s the Troubles began again in Northern Ireland. They had their origins in the partition of Ireland during the Irish War of Independence. They came to an end with the signing of the Good Friday Agreement in 1998. The violence was characterised by an armed campaign against the British presence in Northern Ireland by the Provisional Irish Republican Army, British counter-insurgency policy, and attacks on civilians by both Ulster loyalists and Irish republicans. There was also widespread collusion between loyalist paramilitaries and British security forces, as established in the Stevens Inquiries, with hundreds of members of the RUC and UDR being members of the UVF and UDA, including carrying out sectarian murders, and British military intelligence giving targets, intelligence, arms and training to loyalists. There was also, to a far lesser extent, collusion between republicans and both British and Irish security forces, including Gardaí giving intelligence that led to the 1989 Jonesborough ambush (see Smithwick Tribunal).

Although both loyalist and republican paramilitaries carried out terrorist atrocities against civilians which were often tit-for-tat, a case can be made for saying that attacks such as the Provisional IRA carried out on British soldiers at Warrenpoint in 1979 was a well planned guerrilla ambush. Anti-Good Friday Agreement splinter groups could be called guerrillas but are usually called terrorists or dissidents by governments of both the British and Irish governments. The news media such as BBC News and CNN will often use the term "gunmen" as in "IRA gunmen" or "Loyalist gunmen". Since 1995 CNN also uses guerrilla as in "IRA guerrilla" and "Protestant guerrilla". Reuters, in accordance with its principle of not using the word terrorist except in direct quotes, refers to "guerrilla groups".

=== Latin American insurgence ===
In the 1960s, 1970s, and 1980s, Latin America had several urban guerrilla movements whose strategy was to destabilize regimes and provoke a counter-reaction by the military. The theory was that a harsh military regime would oppress the middle classes who would then support the guerrillas and create a popular uprising.

While these movements did destabilize governments, such as Argentina, Uruguay, Guatemala, and Peru to the point of military intervention, the military generally proceeded to completely wipe out the guerrilla movements, usually committing several atrocities among both civilians and armed insurgents in the process.

Several other left-wing guerrilla movements, sometimes backed by Cuba, attempted to overthrow US-backed governments or right-wing military dictatorships. US-backed Contra guerrillas attempted to overthrow the left-wing Sandinista government of Nicaragua. The Sandinista Revolution saw the involvement of Women and the Armed Struggle in Nicaragua.

=== Iran–Iraq War ===
During the eight-year Iran–Iraq War, irregular warfare was used against Iraqi Armed Forces. The Iranian Irregular Warfare Headquarters, the 65th Airborne Special Forces Brigade of the Islamic Republic of Iran Army, and Peshmerga of Iraqi Kurdistan were involved.

== Since 1990 ==
=== Europe since 2000 ===
The Greek Marxist 17 November disbanded around 2002 following the capture and imprisonment of much of its leadership.

The ongoing war between pro-independence groups in Chechnya and the Russian Armed Forces is currently the most active guerrilla war in Europe. Most of the incidents reported by the Western news media are very gory terrorist acts against Russian civilians committed by Chechen separatists outside Chechnya. However, within Chechnya the war has many of the characteristics of a classic guerrilla war. See the article History of Chechnya for more details.

In Northern Ireland, the Real Irish Republican Army and the Continuity Irish Republican Army, two small, radical splinter groups who broke with the Provisional Irish Republican Army, continue to exist. They are dwarfed in size by the Provisional IRA and have been less successful in terms of both popularity among Irish republicans and guerrilla activity: The Continuity IRA has failed to carry out any killings, while the Real IRA's only attacks resulting in deaths were the 1998 Omagh bombing, which killed 29 civilians, a booby trap torch bomb in Derry which killed a former Ulster Defence Regiment soldier, and a 2009 attack on a Northern Ireland military installation which killed 2 British soldiers and wounded several others.

=== Iran ===
After 1979 Revolution, the Iranian Defence Minister Mostafa Chamran established the Irregular Warfare Headquarters as part of the Iranian Armed Forces. He employed the force against Iraqi military during the Iran–Iraq War. The unit was later disbanded.

=== Iraq (2003–2011) ===
The Iraqi insurgency used guerrilla tactics against the U.S.-led Multi-National Force – Iraq. Such tactics include the bombing and ambushing of American and allied convoys, as well as non-combat MOS's throughout all United States Armed Forces branches; hit-and-run raids on opposition bases; and the public execution of civilians who were allied with the U.S.-led coalition. It is reported that 31,994 coalition troops were wounded in action, while 4,418 were killed, 3,481 of whom were killed in action, and 937 that were non-hostile. 37% of those hostile combat casualties in Iraq were combat service support or non combat MOS's, which shows the extent of the guerrilla war waged in Iraq. Sunni insurgents not only established a de facto government in the Al Anbar province they were able to gain huge footholds in Mosul, Tel Afar, Samarra, Northern Baghdad, etc. Insurgent control was maintained despite a series of coalition campaigns; the worsening violence in Baghdad led to the recall of coalition forces, ensuring continued insurgent control.

=== Naxal Insurgency ===
The Naxal insurgency in West Bengal was the beginning of the rising of Maoists in eastern India. The Naxals, begun their People's War through radical students in the city of Calcutta, however it continues today, having its bases in rural India and top universities. The area under Maoist control has been viewed as a war zone and the group itself has been called the biggest threat to Indian Security by Indian Prime Minister Manmohan Singh.

=== Afghanistan (2001–2016) ===
The Taliban uprising took place after Afghanistan's invasion by Allied forces in 2001. As in the earlier wars against the British and Soviets, Afghan resistance to the NATO intervention took the traditional form of a Muslim "holy war (jihad) against the infidels". As with the Soviet invasion of Afghanistan 20 years earlier, the Taliban took refuge in the Pakistani Mountain areas and continue to move across the border between Afghanistan and Pakistan, often evading Pakistani and NATO forces. The Taliban have now become a dominant role in the Afghan life once again. The Pakistani Government have been accused of supporting and/or turning a blind eye to the Afghan Taliban, while the Pakistani Government has accused NATO of doing the same.

== List of historical examples ==
=== Successful guerrilla campaigns ===
- American Revolutionary War (1775–1783); actions and campaigns by Francis Marion, William R. Davie, Nathaniel Greene, plus many other American commanders and partisans against the British Empire
- War of 1812 (1812–1815); America only defeated Tecumseh's confederacy, Spain, and Red Sticks. But could only fight Great Britain to a draw.
- Irish War of Independence (1919–1921); campaign organized by Michael Collins
- Peninsular War in Spain (1808–1814)
- First Boer War (1880–1881)
- Greek War of Independence against the Ottoman Empire (1821–1830)
- Rif War (1920–1927) which was led by Abd el-Krim
- Algerian War (1954–1962)
- Soviet–Afghan War (1979–1989)
- War in Afghanistan (2001–2021)
- Burma Campaign (1942–1945)
- Cuban Revolution (1956–1959)
- East Timor (1999)
- Kosovo Liberation Army (1992–1999)
- Eritrean War of Independence (1961–1991)
- Turkish Revolutionaries at Turkish War of Independence against partitioning of the Ottoman Empire by the Allies
- Arab Revolt (1916–1918)
- Haitian Revolution
- Independence wars in Latin America
- Indonesian War of Independence against the Netherlands and the United Kingdom (1945–1949).
- Hezbollah in southern Lebanon (1982–2000)
- Philippines during the Japanese occupation of World War II (Note: See, for example, the guerilla operations in the cordillera of Northern Luzon led by then-Col. Russell Volckmann, United States Army, who escaped from Corregidor in the last hours before the capture of the rest of its military defenders, and who wrote a memoir, We Remained (1954). Volckmann was later promoted to general.)
- Rhodesian Bush War (1972–1980)
- portions of the Wars of Scottish Independence; notably, actions led by Robert the Bruce (13th century – 14th century)
- First Indochina War (1946–1954)
- Vietnam War (1959–1975)
- Cambodian Civil War (1967–1975)
- Bangladesh Liberation War (1971)
- People's War in Nepal
- The Partisans of Yugoslavia
- China (Communists vs. Nationalists) (1946–1949)
- Nicaragua (1977–1979)

=== Unsuccessful guerrilla campaigns ===
- Irish Guerrilla campaign (1799–1803)
- Caucasian War (1817–1864)
- War of 1812. America could not defeat the British. The Americans could only defeat Tecumseh's confederacy, Spain, and Red Sticks
- Abd al-Qadir in Algeria (1830–1847)
- Taiping Rebellion in Qing China (1850–1864)
- Polish uprising (1863–1865)
- Philippine–American War (1899–1902) Moro Rebellion (1899–1913)
- Second Boer War (1899–1902)
- Ukrainian nationalist partisans and guerrillas during and after the Russian Civil War
- Makhnovist anarchists and guerrillas in Ukraine after the Russian Civil War
- Basmachi rebels in Soviet Central Asia (1916–1931)
- Tambov Rebellion in Soviet Russia (1919–1921)
- Irish Civil War (1922–1923)
- IRA S-Plan campaign (1939–1941) Northern Campaign (IRA) (1942–1944) Border Campaign (IRA) (1956–1962)
- Spanish Maquis after the Spanish Civil War
- Polish resistance movement (1939–1944), unsuccessful until USSR replacement of German occupation
- Italian guerrilla war in Ethiopia (1941–1943)
- Greek Civil War (1945–1949)
- Nazi German Werwolf movement (1945)
- Ukrainian Insurgent Army (UPA) (1944–1949)
- Latvia, Estonia and Lithuania 1944–1965, Forest Brothers, Latvian national partisans, Lithuanian partisans
- Malayan Emergency (1948–1960)
- Karen National Liberation Army in Burma
- Mau Mau Uprising (1952–1960)
- Tibet 1958–1974, resistance against Chinese occupation ultimately failed when American Central Intelligence Agency withdrew its support in context of President Richard Nixon's diplomatic overtures to the People's Republic of China
- Parrari in Pakistan 1960s
- Dhofar Rebellion in Oman, (1962–1976)
- LTTE's campaign against the Sri Lanka government, (1978–2009)
- Thailand 1964–1982 Communist Party of Thailand (CPT). It suffered major setbacks in late 1970s and an amnesty was granted by the Thai government to all of its fighters in 1982, ending a long rebellion that once had much of rural areas under control.
- Simba rebellion in Congo (1963–1965)
- Dominican Civil War (1965) U.S. forces suppressed Dominican guerrillas
- Uruguay 1965–1973, the Tupamaros were suppressed by the army forces that later took power
- Argentina 1969–1981 Montoneros and ERP were suppressed by security forces around 1977
- Polisario Front in Western Sahara
- El Salvador Civil War (1979–1992)
- Second Sudanese Civil War (1983–2005)
- Kashmir Armed insurgency vs India (1989–present)
- Kachin Independent Army in Burma
- Internal conflict in Peru – insurgencies led by two rival Marxist guerrilla groups, the Shining Path and Túpac Amaru Revolutionary Movement from 1981 to 2000
- Armed Islamic Group (GIA) in Algeria

=== Ongoing guerrilla campaigns ===
- Ukrainian resistance in Russian-occupied Ukraine and partisan conflict in Russia

== See also ==
- Guerrilla warfare
- Guerrilla Warfare by Che Guevara
- On Guerrilla Warfare by Mao Zedong
- Reagan Doctrine
- Strategy and tactics of guerrilla warfare
- Yank Levy
- Polack, Peter (2018). Guerrilla Warfare: Kings of Revolution. Casemate. ISBN 978-1-612006-758.
