= On Protracted War =

Work of compiled speeches by Mao Zedong

On Protracted War (simplified Chinese: 论持久战; traditional Chinese: 論持久戰; pinyin: Lùn chíjiǔ zhàn) is a work comprising a series of speeches by Mao Zedong given from May 26, 1938, to June 3, 1938, at the Yenan Association for the Study of the War of Resistance Against Japan. In it, he calls for a protracted people's war, as a means for small revolutionary groups to fight the power of the state.

== Content ==
Mao proposed the idea of protracted war in response to two prominent extreme views of the Second Sino-Japanese War. Mao opposed both the overly optimistic view (referred to as the "quick-win theory") that China would receive foreign help to defeat Japan while the Communist Party of Japan overthrew the emperor and the overly pessimistic view (the "subjugation theory") that presumed Japan would overwhelm China, maybe in as quick as three months.

=== Strategy ===
Mao starts off the book by critiquing the "defeatist exponents of the theory of national subjugation". He argues that because of the creation of the Second United Front and national "perseverance" the Japanese have failed to achieve a victory through mobile warfare and that China was now engaged in a "protracted war". Afterwards, Mao criticizes the proponents of "China's quick victory" stating that they were underestimating the enemy. He expresses his dislike of armchair generals who assume that Guerrilla warfare holds a supplementary role to mobile warfare. Mao laments that their hopes consisted chiefly of a victory through foreign military intervention by the Soviet Union or victory through a decisive military solution.

Mao stated that there had to be three prerequisites in order to achieve victory and defeat the forces of Japan:

"First, the establishment of an anti-Japanese united front in China; second, the formation of an international anti-Japanese united front; third, the rise of the revolutionary movement of the people in Japan and the Japanese colonies. From the standpoint of the Chinese people, the unity of the people of China is the most important of the three conditions."

Mao argues that resistance against Japan must come through the form of both conventional resistance, and a rearward strike on the logistical and reinforcement capabilities of Japanese forces. He asserted that warfare through conventional means must not involve static defense of nonessential strategic objectives.

"Our strategy should be to employ our main forces to operate over an extended and fluid front. To achieve success, Chinese forces must conduct their warfare with a high degree of mobility on extensive battlefields... This means large scale mobile warfare, and not positional warfare... It does not mean the abandonment of all the vital strategic points, which should be defended by positional warfare as long as possible... Positional warfare is necessary, but strategically it is auxiliary and secondary."

As part of his goal to wage a people's war, Mao explained that large numbers of Guerrilla units among the peasants were necessary for such a strategy to succeed. China's ability to supply her troops depended on captured Japanese equipment stocks and foreign deliveries, allowing China to conduct positional warfare when her conventional capabilities matched the Japanese, who would be worn down using the aforementioned rearward strikes.

=== Politics ===
The basis of a people's war, a war waged by the peasants and thus the party, necessitated political control over military operations. This was echoed by his 1938 statement:

"Political power grows out of the barrel of a gun. Our principle is that the Party commands the gun, and the gun must never be allowed to command the Party. Yet, having guns, we can create Party organizations, as witness the powerful Party organizations which the Eighth Route Army has created in northern China."

In On Protracted War Mao argues that wars waged by communists were inherently progressive and just. All wars which had the support of the party were to be actively participated in, even if they were in coordination with reactionary factions. Mao criticized "idealists" who refused to cooperate with said reactionaries.

=== Influence ===
Among the military pedagogical films produced by the PLA's August First Film Studio was Tunnel Warfare, depicts villagers who become guerillas and build a network of tunnels in which invading enemy troops ultimately become trapped. Tunnel Warfare highlighted the principles discussed in On Protracted War. Tunnel Warfare was viewed approximately 1.8 billion times.

== See also ==
- Guerrilla Warfare by Che Guevara
- "Yank" Levy, author of the original book entitled Guerilla Warfare
- On Guerrilla Warfare by Mao Zedong
