= Irregular military =

Any non-standard military organization

Irregular military is any military component distinct from a country's regular armed forces, representing non-standard militant elements outside of conventional governmental backing. Irregular elements can consist of militias, private armies, mercenaries, or other non-state actors, though no single definition exists beyond exclusion from national service. Without standard military unit organization, various more general names are often used; such organizations may be called a troop, group, unit, column, band, or force. Irregulars are soldiers or warriors that are members of these organizations, or are members of special military units that employ irregular military tactics. This also applies to irregular infantry and irregular cavalry units.

Irregular warfare is warfare employing the tactics commonly used by irregular military organizations. This often overlaps with asymmetrical warfare, avoiding large-scale combat and focusing on small, stealthy, hit-and-run engagements.

== Regular vs. irregular ==
The words "regular" and "irregular" have been used to describe combat forces for centuries, usually with little ambiguity. The requirements of a government's chain of command cause the regular army to be very well defined, and anybody fighting outside it, other than official paramilitary forces, are irregular. In case the legitimacy of the army or its opponents is questioned, some legal definitions have been created.

In international humanitarian law, the term "irregular forces" refers to a category of combatants that consists of individuals forming part of the armed forces of a party to an armed conflict, international or domestic, but not belonging to that party's regular forces and operating inside or outside of their own territory, even if the territory is under occupation.

The Third Geneva Convention of 1949 uses "regular armed forces" as a critical distinction. The International Committee of the Red Cross (ICRC) is a non-governmental organization primarily responsible for and most closely associated with the drafting and successful completion of the Third Geneva Convention Relative to the Treatment of Prisoners of War ("GPW"). The ICRC provided commentary saying that "regular armed forces" satisfy four Hague Conventions (1899 and 1907) (Hague IV) conditions. In other words, "regular forces" must satisfy the following criteria:

- being commanded by a person responsible for his subordinates to a party of conflict
- having a fixed distinctive emblem recognizable at a distance
- carrying arms openly
- conducting operations in accordance with the laws and customs of war

By extension, combat forces that do not satisfy these criteria are termed "irregular forces".

== Types ==
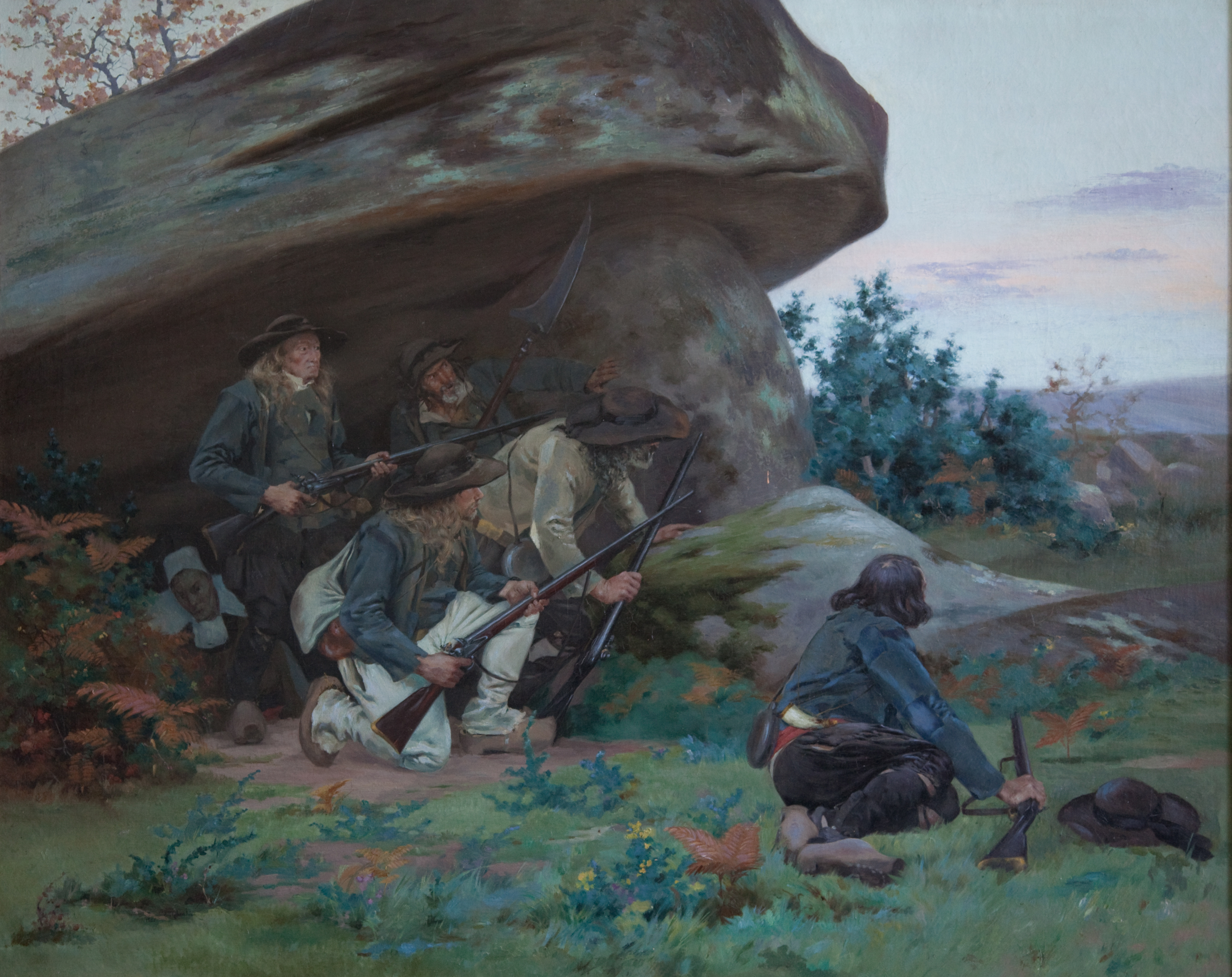
Chouans hiding behind a dolmen

The term "irregular military" describes the "how" and "what", but it is more common to focus on the "why" as just about all irregular units were created to provide a tactical advantage to an existing military, whether it was privateer forces harassing shipping lanes against assorted New World colonies on behalf of their European contractors, or Auxiliaries, levies, civilian and other standing irregular troops that are used as more expendable supplements to assist costly trained soldiers. Bypassing the legitimate military and taking up arms is an extreme measure. The motivation for doing so is often used as the basis of the primary label for any irregular military. Different terms come into and out of fashion, based on political and emotional associations that develop. Here is a list of such terms, which is organized more or less from oldest to latest:

- Auxiliaries – foreign or allied troops supplementing the regular army, organized from provincial or tribal regions. In the Imperial Roman army, it became common to maintain a number of auxiliaries about equal to the legionaries.
- Levies – feudal peasants and freemen liable to be called up for short-term military duty.
- Privateer – a "for-profit" private person or ship authorized and sponsored by a government by letters of marque to attack foreign vessels during wartime and to destroy or disrupt logistics of the enemy during "peacetime", often on the open sea by attacking its merchant shipping, rather than engaging its combatants or enforcing a blockade against them.
- Revolutionary – someone part of a revolution, whether military or not.
- Guerrilla – someone who uses unconventional military tactics. The term tends to refer to groups engaged in open conflict, rather than underground resistance. It was coined during the Peninsula War in Spain against France.
- Montoneras – they were a type of irregular forces that were formed in the 19th century in Latin America.
- Franc-tireur – French irregular forces during the Franco-Prussian War. The term is also used in international legal cases as a synonym for unprivileged combatant (for example the Hostages Trial [1947–1948]).
- Militia – military force composed of ordinary citizens.
- Ordenanças – The Portuguese territorial militia system from the 16th century to the 19th century. From the 17th century, it became the third line of the Army, serving both as local defense force and as the mobilization system that provided conscripts for the first (Regular) and second (Militia) lines of the Army.
- Partisan – In the 20th century, someone part of a resistance movement. In the 18th and 19th century, a local conventional military force using irregular tactics. Often used to refer to resistance movements against the Axis powers during the Second World War.
- Freedom fighter – A type of irregular military in which the main cause, in their or their supporters' view, is freedom for themselves or others.
- Paramilitary – An organization whose structure, tactics, training, subculture, and (often) function are similar to those of a professional military, but which is not part of a country's official or legitimate armed forces.
- Terrorist – An irregular military that targets civilians and other non-combatants to gain political leverage. The term is almost always used pejoratively. Although reasonably well defined, its application is frequently controversial.
- False flag or pseudo-operations – Troops of one side dressing like troops of another side to eliminate or discredit the latter and its support, such as members of the Panzer Brigade 150, commanded by Waffen-SS commando Otto Skorzeny in Operation Greif during the Battle of the Bulge in World War II and Selous Scouts of the Rhodesian Bush War.
- Insurgent – An alternate term for a member of an irregular military that tends to refer to members of underground groups such as the Iraqi Insurgency, rather than larger rebel organizations like the Revolutionary Armed Forces of Colombia.
- Fifth column - A group that carries out sabotage, disinformation, espionage, and/or terrorism within a group that responds to external enemies
- Bandit - It is generally treated as an organized crime, but it has the character of a resistance movement depending on the political and social situation.
- Private army - Combatants who owe their allegiance to a private person, group, or organization.
- Mercenary or "soldier of fortune" – Someone who is generally not a national in an official standing army or regular military force or not otherwise an inherently-invested party to an armed conflict who becomes involved in an armed conflict for monetary motives or for private gain. Mercenaries are often explicitly hired to fight or provide manpower or expertise in exchange for money; material wealth or, less commonly, political power. Mercenaries are often experienced combatants or former regular soldiers who decided to sell their combat experience, skill, or manpower to interested parties or to the highest bidder in an armed conflict. Famous historic examples of "professional" or organized (often "career") mercenaries include the Italian condottieri, or "contractors", leaders of "free agent" mercenary armies that provided their armies to the various Italian city-states and the Papal states during the Late Middle Ages and Renaissance Italy in exchange for profit, land or power. However, not all soldiers deemed to be "mercenaries" are "professional" or "career" mercenaries, and many mercenaries may be simply opportunists or persons with no prior combat experience. Whether a combatant is truly a "mercenary" may be a matter of controversy or degree, as financial and national interests often overlap, and most standing regular armies also provide their soldiers with some form of payment. Furthermore, as reflected in the Geneva Convention, mercenaries are generally provided less protection under the rules of war than non-mercenaries, and many countries have criminalized "mercenary activity".

Intense debates can build up over which term is to be used to refer to a specific group. Using one term over another can strongly imply strong support or opposition for the cause.

It is possible for a military to cross the line between regular and irregular. Isolated regular army units that are forced to operate without regular support for long periods of time can degrade into irregulars. As an irregular military becomes more successful, it may transition away from irregular, even to the point of becoming the new regular army if it wins.

== Regular military units that use irregular military tactics ==
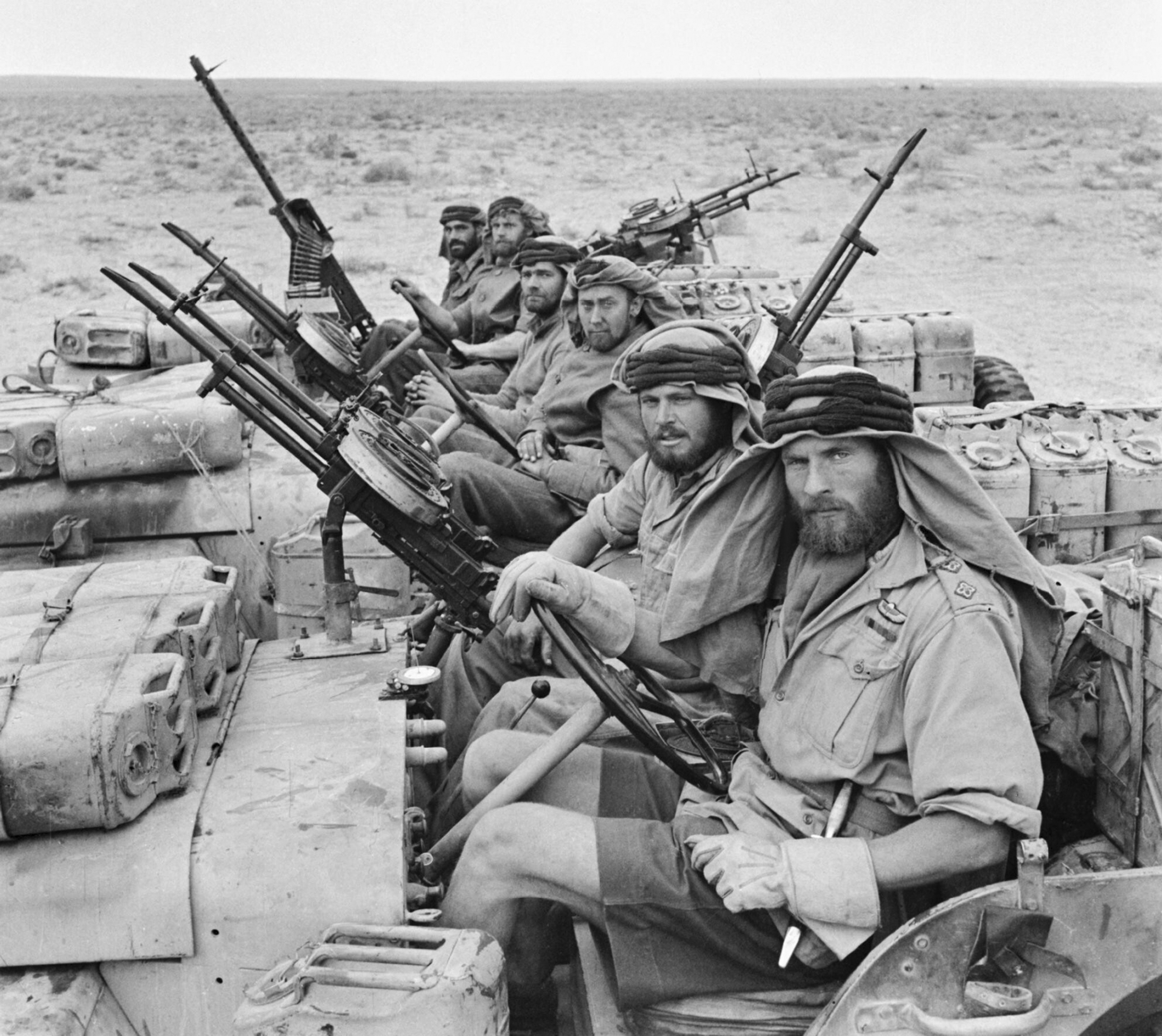
British SAS patrol in armed jeeps during the North African campaign of World War II

Most conventional military officers and militaries are wary of using irregular military forces and see them as unreliable, of doubtful military usefulness, and prone to committing atrocities leading to retaliation in kind. Usually, such forces are raised outside the regular military like the British SOE during World War II and, more recently, the CIA's Special Activities Center. However at times, such as out of desperation, conventional militaries will resort to guerilla tactics, usually to buy breathing space and time for themselves by tying up enemy forces to threaten their line of communications and rear areas, such as the 43rd Battalion Virginia Cavalry and the Chindits.

Although they are part of a regular army, United States Special Forces are trained in missions such as implementing irregular military tactics. However, outside the United States, the term special forces does not generally imply a force that is trained to fight as guerillas and insurgents. Originally, the United States Special Forces were created to serve as a cadre around which stay-behind resistance forces could be built in the event of a communist victory in Europe or elsewhere. The United States Special Forces and the CIA's Special Activities Center can trace their lineage to the OSS operators of World War II, which were tasked with inspiring, training, arming and leading resistance movements in German-occupied Europe and Japanese occupied Asia.

In Finland, well-trained light infantry Sissi troops use irregular tactics such as reconnaissance, sabotage and guerrilla warfare behind enemy lines.

The founder of the People's Republic of China, Mao Zedong actively advocated for the use of irregular military tactics by regular military units. In his book On Guerrilla Warfare, Mao described seven types of Guerilla units, and argues that "regular army units temporarily detailed for the purpose (of guerilla warfare)," "regular army units permanently detailed (for the purpose of guerilla warfare)," and bands of guerillas created "through a combination of a regular army unit and a unit recruited from the people" were all examples of ways in which regular military units could be involved in irregular warfare. Mao argues that regular army units temporarily detailed for irregular warfare are essential because "First, in mobile-warfare situations, the coordination of guerilla activities with regular operations is necessary. Second, until guerilla hostilities can be developed on a grand scale, there is no one to carry out guerilla missions but regulars." He also emphasizes the importance for the use of regular units permanently attached to guerilla warfare activities, stating that they can play key roles in severing enemy supply routes.

== Effectiveness ==
While the morale, training and equipment of the individual irregular soldier can vary from very poor to excellent, irregulars are usually lacking the higher-level organizational training and equipment that is part of regular army. This usually makes irregulars ineffective in direct, main-line combat, the typical focus of more standard armed forces. Other things being equal, major battles between regulars and irregulars heavily favor the regulars.

However, irregulars can excel at many other combat duties besides main-line combat, such as scouting, skirmishing, harassing, pursuing, rear-guard actions, cutting supply, sabotage, raids, ambushes and underground resistance. Experienced irregulars often surpass the regular army in these functions. By avoiding formal battles, irregulars have sometimes harassed high quality armies to destruction.

The total effect of irregulars is often underestimated. Since the military actions of irregulars are often small and unofficial, they are underreported or even overlooked. Even when engaged by regular armies, some military histories exclude all irregulars when counting friendly troops, but include irregulars in the count of enemy troops, making the odds seem much worse than they were. This may be accidental; counts of friendly troops often came from official regular army rolls that exclude unofficial forces, while enemy strength often came from visual estimates, where the distinction between regular and irregular were lost. If irregular forces overwhelm regulars, records of the defeat are often lost in the resulting chaos.

== History ==
By definition, "irregular" is understood in contrast to "regular armies", which grew slowly from personal bodyguards or elite militia. In Ancient warfare, most civilized nations relied heavily on irregulars to augment their small regular army. Even in advanced civilizations, the irregulars commonly outnumbered the regular army.

Sometimes entire tribal armies of irregulars were brought in from internal native or neighboring cultures, especially ones that still had an active hunting tradition to provide the basic training of irregulars. The regulars would only provide the core military in the major battles; irregulars would provide all other combat duties.

Notable examples of regulars relying on irregulars include Bashi-bazouk units in the Ottoman Empire, auxiliary cohorts of Germanic peoples in the Roman Empire, Cossacks in the Russian Empire, and Native American forces in the American frontier of the Confederate States of America.

One could attribute the disastrous defeat of the Romans at the Battle of the Teutoburg Forest to the lack of supporting irregular forces; only a few squadrons of irregular light cavalry accompanied the invasion of Germany when normally the number of foederati and auxiliaries would equal the regular legions. During this campaign the majority of locally recruited irregulars defected to the Germanic tribesmen led by the former auxiliary officer Arminius.

During the decline of the Roman Empire, irregulars made up an ever-increasing proportion of the Roman military. At the end of the Western Empire, there was little difference between the Roman military and the barbarians across the borders.

Following Napoleon's modernisation of warfare with the invention of conscription, the Peninsular War led by Spaniards against the French invaders in 1808 provided the first modern example of guerrilla warfare. Indeed, the term of guerrilla itself was coined during this time.

As the Industrial Revolution dried up the traditional source of irregulars, nations were forced take over the duties of the irregulars using specially trained regular army units. Examples are the light infantry in the British Army.

=== Irregular regiments in British India ===
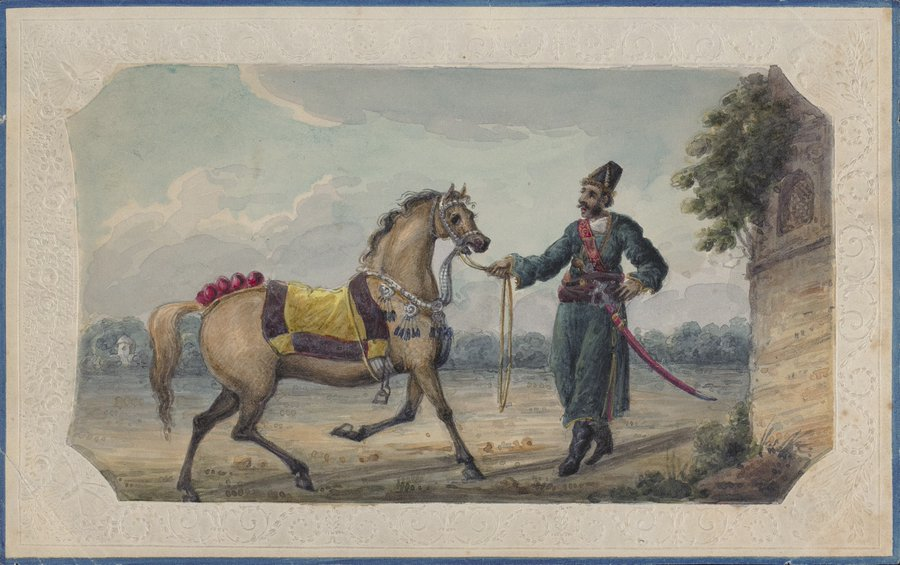
Gardner's Irregular Horse of Hindustani Mahomedans

Prior to 1857 Britain's East India Company maintained large numbers of cavalry and infantry regiments officially designated as "irregulars", although they were permanently established units. The end of Muslim rule saw a large number of unemployed Indian Muslim horsemen, who were employed in the army of the EIC. British officers such as Skinner, Gardner and Hearsay had become leaders of irregular cavalry that preserved the traditions of Mughal cavalry, which had a political purpose because it absorbed pockets of cavalrymen who might otherwise become disaffected plunderers. These were less formally drilled and had fewer British officers (sometimes only three or four per regiment) than the "regular" sepoys in British service. This system enabled the Indian officers to achieve greater responsibility than their counterparts in regular regiments. Promotion for both Indian and British officers was for efficiency and energy, rather than by seniority as elsewhere in the EIC's armies. In irregular cavalry the Indian troopers provided their horses under the silladar system. The result was a loose collection of regiments which in general were more effective in the field than their regular counterparts. These irregular units were also cheaper to raise and maintain and as a result many survived into the new Indian Army that was organized following the great Indian Rebellion of 1857.

=== Irregular military in Canada before 1867 ===
Before 1867, military units in Canada consisted of British units of volunteers.

During French rule, small local volunteer militia units or colonial militias were used to provide defence needs. During British control of various local militias, the Provincial Marine were used to support British regular forces in Canada.

=== Other instances of irregulars ===
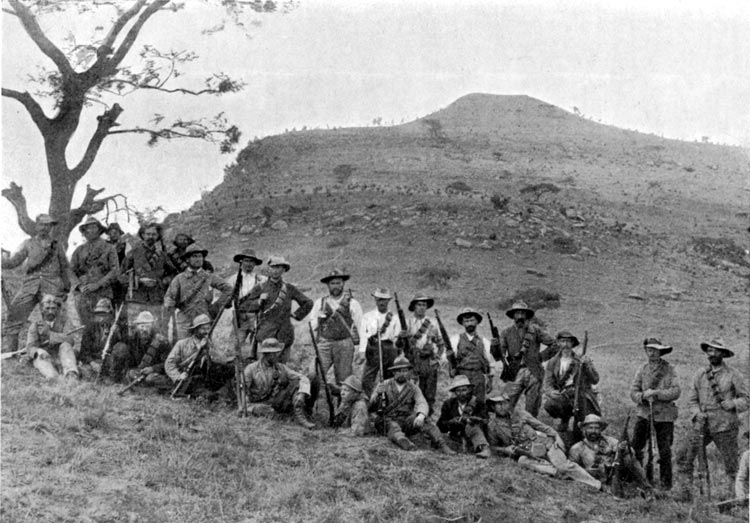
Boer Militia

Use of large irregular forces featured heavily in wars such as the Three Kingdoms period, the American Revolution, the Irish War of Independence and Irish Civil War, the Franco-Prussian War, the Russian Civil War, the Second Boer War, Liberation war of Bangladesh, Vietnam War, the Syrian Civil War and especially the Eastern Front of World War II where hundreds of thousands of partisans fought on both sides.

The Chinese People's Liberation Army began as a peasant guerilla force which in time transformed itself into a large regular force. This transformation was foreseen in the doctrine of "people's war", in which irregular forces were seen as being able to engage the enemy and to win the support of the populace but as being incapable of taking and holding ground against regular military forces.

== Examples ==
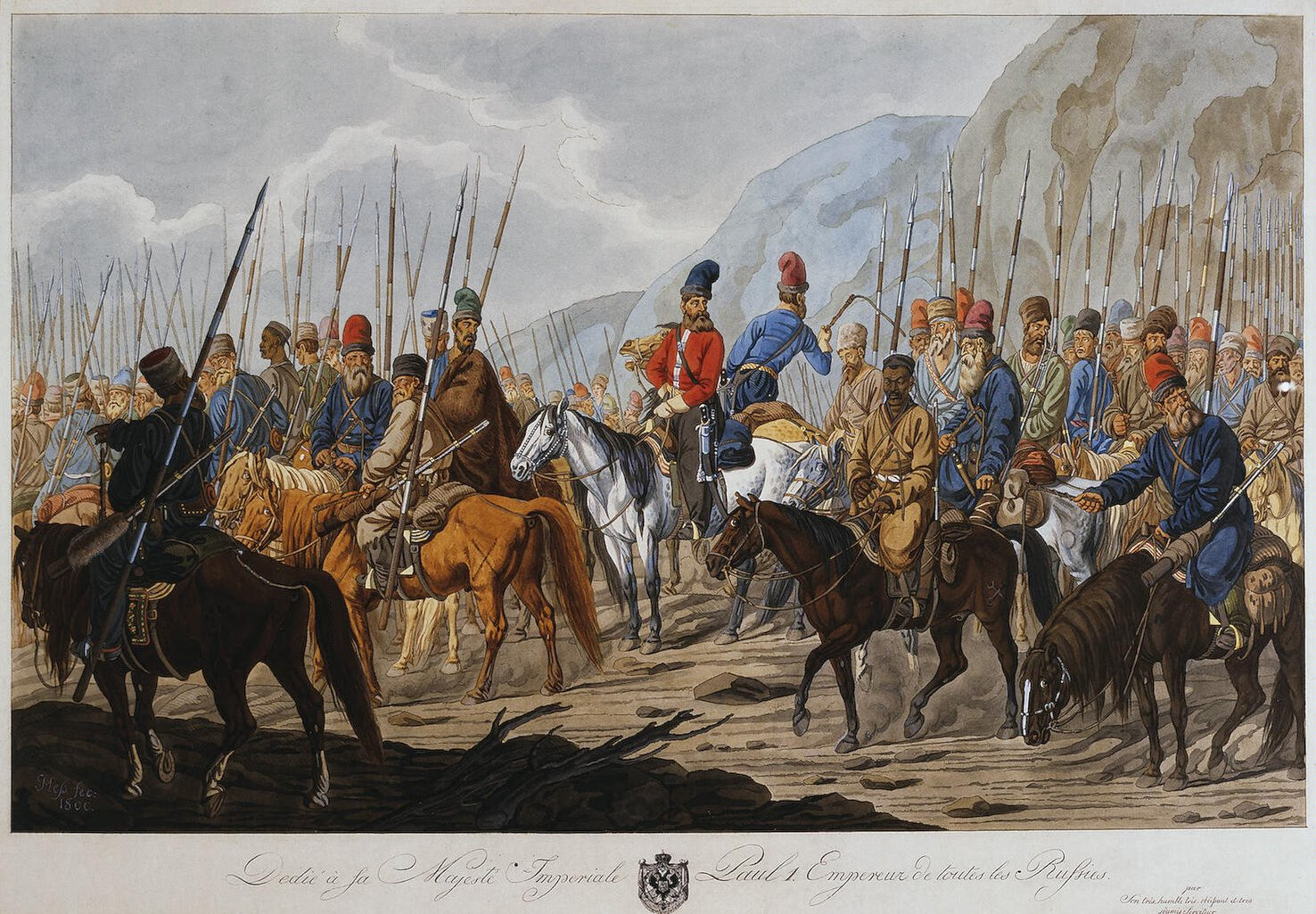
Ural Cossacks on the march during the Napoleonic Wars, c. 1799

- Arbegnoch – Guerrilla force in occupied Ethiopia 1936–44
- Armatoloi – Ottoman Greek irregulars
- Armenian fedayi – Armenian irregular units of the 1880s–1920s
- Atholl Highlanders – The only legal and still existing private army in Europe under the command of the Duke of Atholl in Scotland, United Kingdom, (1777–1783 and since 1839)
- Bands – Italian Army colonial and foreign irregulars
- Bargi – Maratha horsemen 1741–51
- Bashi-bazouk – Irregular mounted mercenary in the Ottoman Empire
- Border ruffian / Jayhawker
- Bushwhackers – Irregular partisans who fought for the South during the American Civil War
- Cacos – Haitian insurgent groups 19th and 20th centuries
- Camisards – Huguenot insurgency in the beginning of the 18th century in the Cévennes
- Cateran – Scottish clan warriors and marauders pre-18th century
- Çetes – Muslim irregulars Asia Minor 1910s–1920s
- Cheta – armed bands resisting Ottoman rule in Macedonia, early 20th century
- Chetniks – nationalist movement and guerrilla force in occupied Yugoslavia 1941–44
- Cossacks – East Slavic irregular cavalry forces
- Croats (military unit) – 17th century frontier light cavalry in Habsburgh service
- Dubat – indigenous auxiliaries in Italian Somaliand
- Fano – Ethiopian guerrilla force
- Fedayeen – Arabic term for fighters willing to sacrifice themselves
- Fellagha – nationalist militants in Algeria and Tunisia opposing French colonial rule 1950s
- Filibuster (military) – participants in foreign military interventions without official backing
- Free Corps (Freikorps) – volunteer units in German-speaking countries, that existed from the 18th to the early 20th centuries as private armies (see also: Freikorps)
- Free Swarm (Freischar) – volunteers, that participated in a conflict without the formal authorisation of one of the belligerents, but on the instigation of a political party or an individual
- Goumiers – originally tribal allies supporting France in Algeria during the 19th century. From 1912 to 1956 Moroccan auxiliaries serving with the French Army
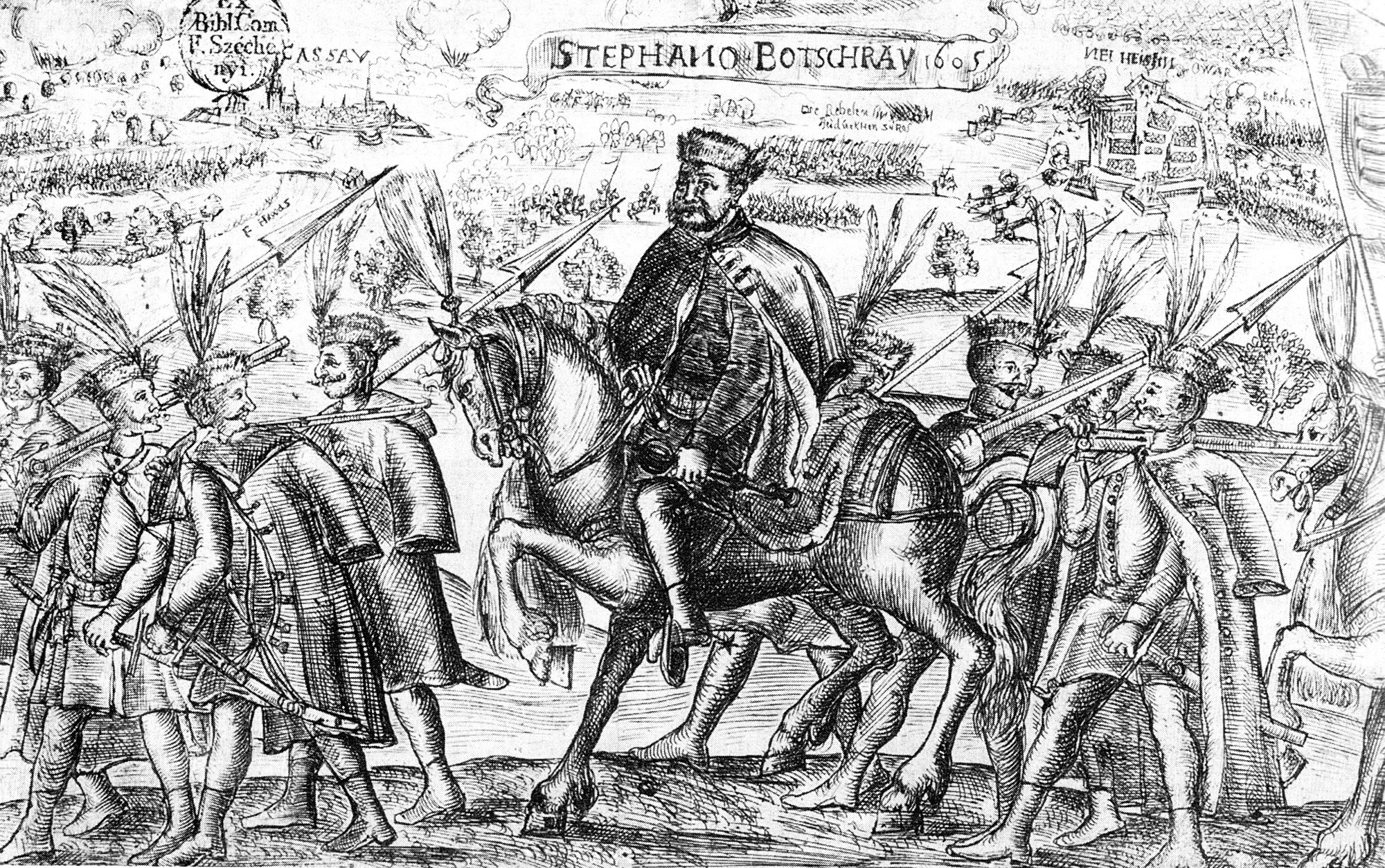
  Stephen Bocskai and his hajduk warriors
- Hajduks— bandits and irregulars in and against the Ottoman Empire, but found amongst military ranks in Hungary and the Polish–Lithuanian Commonwealth
- Harkis – Algerian Muslim irregulars who served with the French Army during the Algerian War of 1954–62
- Haydamak – pro-Cossack paramilitary (18th century)
- Honghuzi – Manchurian bandits who served as irregulars during the Russo-Japanese War of 1904–1905
- Jagunço – armed hand in Northern Brazil.
- Kachaks – Albanian bandits and rebels (1880s–1930)
- Klephts – Greek guerrilla fighters in Ottoman Greece
- Komitadji – rebel bands operating in the Balkans during the final period of the Ottoman Empire
- Kuruc – Hungarian insurgent groups 17th–18th centuries
- Kuva-yi Milliye – Ottoman/Turkish militia 1918–1921
- Land Storm (troops) (Landsturm) – created by a 21 April 1813 edict of Frederick William III of Prussia, lowest level of reserve troops in Prussia, Germany, Austria-Hungary, Sweden, Switzerland and the Netherlands
- Legion of Frontiersmen – An irregular quasi-military organization that proliferated throughout the British Empire prior to World War I
- Macheteros de Jara – Paraguayan cavalry regiment of the Chaco War
- Republiquetas
- Requeté
- Makhnovshchina – Ukrainian anarchist army that fought both the White Armies and the Bolsheviks during the Russian Civil War
- Minutemen – American irregular troops during the American Revolution
  Minutemen at the Battle of Lexington, 19 April 1775
- Morlachs – Dalmatian auxiliaries in Venetian service during the 17th century
- People's Liberation Armed Forces of South Vietnam – Viet Cong's army
- Pindari – 18th century irregular horsemen in India
- Rapparee – Irish guerillas (1690s)
- Ragged Guards – anti-communist and anti-trianon paramilitaries in the Regency, consisting of Hungarians and muslim Bosnians and Albanians
- Righteous Army— militias organised at several dates in Korean history
- Rough Riders – in the Spanish–American War
- Ruga-Ruga – East African auxiliaries to German and British colonial armies
- Selbstschutz
- Shifta – local militia in the Horn of Africa
- Snapphane
- Trenck's Pandurs – Habsburg monarchy 17th and 18th century skirmisher, later evolving in the regular Grenz infantry.
- Zapatistas – militant political movement active in southern Mexico from 1994
- Zeybeks – Ottoman irregulars (17th to 20th centuries)

== Irregulars in today's warfare ==
Modern conflicts in post-invasion Iraq, the renewed Taliban insurgency in the 2001 war in Afghanistan, the Darfur conflict, the rebellion in the North of Uganda by the Lord's Resistance Army, and the Second Chechen War are fought almost entirely by irregular forces on one or both sides.

The CIA's Special Activities Center (SAC) is the premiere American paramilitary clandestine unit for creating or combating irregular military forces. SAD paramilitary officers created and led successful units from the Hmong tribe during the Laotian Civil War in the 1960s and 1970s. They also organized and led the Mujaheddin as an irregular force against the Soviet Union in Afghanistan in the 1980s, as well as the Northern Alliance as an irregular insurgency force against the Taliban with US Army Special Forces during the war in Afghanistan in 2001 and organized and led the Kurdish Peshmerga with US Army Special Forces as an irregular counter-insurgency force against the Kurdish Sunni Islamist group Ansar al-Islam at the Iraq-Iran border and as an irregular force against Saddam Hussein during the war in Iraq in 2003.

Irregular civilian volunteers also played a large role in the Battle of Kyiv during the 2022 Russian Invasion of Ukraine.

== See also ==
- Asymmetric warfare – Military theory that also includes regulars vs. irregulars
- Fourth generation warfare
- "Yank" Levy, teacher of the Home Guard and coauthor of the first practical book on Guerrilla Warfare
- Low intensity conflict
- Military volunteer
- Unconventional warfare
- Violent non-state actors
- Sissi (Finnish light infantry)

=== Legal aspects, categories ===
- Definition of terrorism
- Enemy combatant, US term used during the "War on Terror"
- Law of war
- Martens Clause, stating that customary law applies where specific law is lacking in detail
- Unlawful combatant
