= Yank Levy =

Canadian soldier (1897–1965)

Bert Levy
- Bert Levy in 1942
- Born: October 5, 1897; Hamilton, Ontario, Canada
- Died: September 2, 1965 (aged 67) (Note: "Id#: 0604036 Levy, Bert (Yank) September 2, 1965 Cleveland Plain Dealer; Cleveland Necrology File, Reel #129. Notes: Levy. Bert (Yank) Levy husband of Mae, father of Mrs. Toby Rosen, and grandfather, brother of Harry (deceased) and Mrs. Rose Levy (deceased), Mrs. Sadie Diamond (deceased), Mrs. Jennie Applebaum, of Cleveland, Mrs. Bessie Armour, of Los Angeles, Alex L., of Battle Creek, Mrs. Hilda Nibur, of Los Angeles, and Morris of Cleveland, Ohio passed away in Los Angeles, on Thursday, September 2. Services in Los Angeles Sunday, September 5.") (Note: One source states that his date of death was February 9, 1965. However, this appears to be due to mistaking the D/M/Y format for M/D/Y.); Los Angeles, California, U.S.
- Military career
- Allegiance: United Kingdom; Mexico; Nicaragua; Spanish Republic
- Nickname: "Yank"
- Conflicts: World War I; Sinai and Palestine campaign; Mexican Revolution; Banana Wars; United States occupation of Nicaragua; Spanish Civil War; Battle of Jarama; World War II; Western Front
- Other work: Guerrilla warfare instructor/advocate

Bert "Yank" Levy (October 5, 1897 – September 2, 1965) was a Canadian soldier, socialist, and military instructor who was the author/pamphleteer of one of the first manuals on guerrilla warfare, which was widely circulated with more than a half million published. (Note: According to one source, Wintringham was the primary author. "Transcriber's note: The book from which this introduction comes, was written by Tom Wintringham, based upon the experience of both Wintringham and Levy, but calling heavily upon Wintringham's historical and theoretical knowledge. This introduction, not published in American post-war reprints of the book, acknowledges Wintringham's authorship of the book.") During his career, Yank served with irregular forces in several parts of the world throughout the 1920s and 1930s, most notably in the Spanish Civil War, and was a significant figure at the Osterley Park training school for the British Home Guard during World War II. Similar combat training was provided to forces in the United States and Canada, and he was an itinerant lecturer and provocateur on the subject.

== Background ==
Levy was born in Hamilton, Canada to a Jewish family. His family moved to Buffalo, New York when he was three months old, later moving to Cleveland, Ohio when he was seven years old. His parents were Samuel Levy, a tailor and "horse doctor," and Sarah Pollock. Bert Levy had nine siblings. To counter his frail constitution, Levy became a Boy Scout and a boxer. He grew up on the streets, stating that his "real education was in the school of hard knocks". When he was 16, he dropped out of school after his father was seriously injured by a trolley. He worked with the Kaber Printing Company in Cleveland for four years to help support his younger siblings.

In 1916, he joined the British Merchant Navy working as a stoker. In the spring of 1918, Levy enlisted in the 39th Battalion, Royal Fusiliers (part of the Jewish Legion). Levy continued boxing through World War I and was the regimental bantamweight champion. After returning to Cleveland from the war, he briefly turned professional. He fought in 23 matches before retiring "in order to maintain family harmony".

He married Mary Prezenter, who was a clerk. They had one daughter. He was a pipe smoker, and played the mandolin.

In 1927, Levy was arrested with four other men and a woman for a series of robberies. During a search, police discovered a cache of guns. He was convicted of the January 1927 armed robbery of a Philadelphia A&P food market. Despite this being Levy's first criminal conviction, the judge, Harry McDevitt, imposed a sentence of 25–50 years. After serving six years, Levy was released and deported to Canada, as he was presumed to be a Canadian citizen at the time.

== Military career ==
=== Field service ===
Levy served in five wars and insurrections between 1911 and 1945. The truth of Levy's exploits during his service remains uncertain, as he tended to embellish his biography. (Note: Like some other soldiers of fortune (e.g., William E. Fairbairn), "Levy was fond of making up stories to enhance his prowess as an adventurer".)

From 1918–19, Levy served with the 39th Battalion, Royal Fusiliers (part of the Jewish Legion) in Palestine and Transjordan. That tour ended when he was gassed and contracted malaria. He trained in Nova Scotia, England, and Egypt, later being dispatched as a machine gunner. In September 1918, his unit traversed the Egyptian desert and entered the Jordan River valley, taking control of Es-Salt in a campaign against the Turks. With two other members of the 39th Battalion, he encountered scouts of Colonel T. E. Lawrence. The scouts invited them to tea, and told them stories of amazing feats, resulting in Levy pursuing "a lifelong career in guerrilla warfare."

From 1920–21, Levy was, in his own (attributed) words "mixed up in Mexico" towards the end of the revolution there. Subsequently, Levy was involved in gun-running in Nicaragua, where he served under Augusto César Sandino. In Nicaragua, he outfitted a ship with sandbagged Lewis gun "emplacements in case of a surprise en route by U.S. patrol vessels." His service with the Sandinistas was cut short when the United States and U.S. Marines appeared, as "he had no desire to fight his fellow countrymen." Another scenario is that the Sandinistas deemed the continued reliability of Americans to be dubious as a force opposing the Marines, and they were involuntarily retired.

In 1921, Levy was employed to train Mexicans in the use of the Lewis gun. He left 6 months later when some trainees used their guns on prisoners. Levy also claimed to have participated in "troubles" in countries south of Mexico, once being sentenced to thirty years imprisonment for gun running. The Levys were now broke, living in marital discord.

During the Spanish Civil War, Levy served with the International Brigade as an officer in the British Battalion, under Tom Wintringham, from 1937. The brigade fought against the rightist Falangists. He was captured at the Battle of Jarama by the Guardia Civil, where he had manned a heavy machine gun. He spent six months in a Francoist prison, being released after the Canadian government exchanged him for two Italian officers – something he characterized as "a fair deal." Despite all that, his friends would have to prevent him from re-enlisting and returning to the fray. Upon his release, he went back to Canada, claiming that he recruited 1,200 volunteers for the Republican cause.

At the outbreak of World War II, Levy tried to enlist with the Canadian Army, but was refused due to his flat feet and hammer toes. – There is also a possibility that Levy was refused due to his reputation as "one of the most obstreperous leaders of Canada's unemployed."

== Training officer and consultant ==
=== United Kingdom ===
Following this refusal, Levy worked his passage to Britain as a stoker on a steamer. After arriving in the United Kingdom, he rejoined Wintringham and other International Brigade veterans. Levy worked alongside these other veterans on Home Guard training, and was involved in the establishment of an unofficial training school, funded in part by Wendell Endicott (shoe magnate of Endicott-Johnson Shoes and member of the Home Guard) for the Guard at Osterley Park, where his lectures were well received. Nazi propagandist Lord Haw-Haw, dubbed the Osterley trainees as "Osterley cut throats" due to their hardened approach to guerrilla warfare. This was "Home Guard School #1." Despite becoming famous due to its appearance in newsreels and newspaper articles around the world (particularly in the US), the socialism espoused by the school's instructors was met with disapproval by the War Office (WO) and Winston Churchill, resulting in the WO taking it over in September 1940. Closed in 1941, its staff and courses were reallocated to other newly opened WO-approved Home Guard schools.

While lecturing there, Wintringham helped Levy write his book Guerrilla Warfare, described by some as a "war pamphlet" as a practical manual of guerrilla strategy and tactics. Drawing from the lectures given at Osterley Park, it was published as a mass market paperback in Britain and the U.S. and ran to several editions. Levy advocated guerrilla warfare as a democratic means of combating fascism, frequently attacking the military establishment who overlooked the lessons of such commanders as T. E. Lawrence and their experience in irregular war. He also recounts some of his adventures as a guerrilla, such as when he and his companions trapped cats' tails in mouse traps to distract sentries. Wintringham said that Levy was the most effective communicator in Great Britain on the tactics of commando and guerrilla warfare. His primary lecture subject was knife fighting and hand-to-hand combat.

Levy was also a committed Socialist, which influenced his goals, his analyses, and the presentation of his work. Rather than being purely a technical manual, Guerilla Warfare also advocated for mobilization of citizens for their own defense. Levy compared Home Guard guerrilla forces to historical resistance, such as Hereward the Wake's opposition to William the Conqueror, and pointed to the Arab Revolt and Orde Wingate's Special Night Squads in Mandatory Palestine as examples of effective irregular forces. He also suggested fictional accounts of guerrilla warfare could provide valuable insights, referencing Ernie O'Malley's On Another Man's Wound, Ernest Hemingway's For Whom the Bell Tolls, and Edgar Snow's The Battle for Asia.

The book had significant impact and it received favorable press with Time magazine stating:

Anyone who thinks his country will be invaded – which includes anyone now alive – would do well to read "Yank" Levi's Guerrilla Warfare for instruction on to harass invaders.

Time also enthusiastically noted his unconventional approach:

Sinister Shadow. . . . The Methods of ambush are important. A wire cable strung across a road at an angle will slide a motorcycle off into the ditch, where the cyclist can be slugged and searched . . . Destruction is one aim. A guerrilla learns how to derail and wreck trains, blow up tanks, destroy planes on the ground, and dynamite bridges. In taking sentries, advises Mr. Levy, the back is the best approach. If that is impossible, the guerrilla covers the sentry with his revolver, steps on his foot, unbuttons his tunic, and jerks it down over his arms to lock them. "You may slap his ears with the revolver barrel to intimidate him. . . . You should also drop his trousers to lock his feet." . . . Invisible weapons might include: a . . . lady's hatpin, or a wrist knife strapped to the wrist with the hilt downwards; a knife hung around the neck; a small revolver held up the sleeve by rubber bands; a stiletto with a nine-inch blade. . . . a hammer, cheese-cutters (wires with wooden handles, handy for garroting); a handkerchief with a fistful of sand in it. Besides blankets, extra socks, binoculars, rifles, burnt cork to blacken the face, etc., an important part of the equipment is 25 to 30 yards of fishline. . . . [and] booby traps.

They believed well-trained irregulars could undermine tanks and the Blitzkrieg. As Wintringham noted:

The guerrilla, on the other hand, can exert against the communications of any enemy force, against his dumps as well as his lorries his headquarters as well as his stragglers, a continual pressure, a threat that wears out men and forces. And guerrilla warfare is a method of fighting – a useful method that will, I believe, in future campaigns become essential to success—that can be achieved and developed by democracies and by socialist societies, but cannot be developed by Fascism, particularly in the areas where Fascism rules by force against the will of the population. Successful guerrilla fighting needs the self-confidence and initiative of millions of free men, the support at risk and at heavy sacrifice of almost all the population, and a feeling of close comradeship and solidarity between the guerrilla troops and any regular army and air force supporting them. The Nazis cannot get these qualities at their service, in any of the occupied countries of Europe, even in Italy. We can. And therefore we should not think of guerrilla warfare only in terms of the present heroism of the Soviet Union or a possible future resistance to invasion in this country. We should think of it also in terms of our invasion of the Continent. We should be looking for ways of fighting, and combinations between ways of fighting that enable a democratic force invading Hitler's Europe to mobilize and use the enormous power of the "hundred million allies" who can be ours.

Since the handbook was available for 17–25¢ per copy, it would help it being widely circulated. Over a half million copies were printed. (Note: At that level of publication, it rivaled another famous American pamphlet, Thomas Paine's Common Sense.)

=== United States ===
Despite having been deported from the United States in 1933, Levy's proficiency convinced the United States to allow him to return to train troops at the request of Secretary of State Cordell Hull. Under the direction of General Sherman Miles, who was commanding the First Corps, Levy taught 30 Regular Army and 76 National Guard soldiers, training them to act as partisans in Concord, Massachusetts. The location, "by the rude bridge that arched the flood", was not accidental but was intended to be a call to arms and to invoke the mystique of the Minutemen. He was the first instructor at the school. The idea that a civilian population could rise up and defeat an occupying enemy through guerrilla tactics was unconventional at the time, as guerrilla warfare was seen in a negative light. While still teaching the methods he had at Osterley Park, he began to advocate the scorched earth policies used in the Soviet Union against the Nazi invasion, developing an opportunistic conception of homeland defense. The Soviets had demonstrated that partisans could attack enemy logistics and lines of communication, thereby disrupting mechanized warfare. As he later told spectators at Harvard University:

"Invisibility is better than protection and intimate knowledge of terrain is most important. Utilizing this knowledge of the countryside and employing guerrilla tactics, Home Guard units have defeated the Regular Army troops in war games in Britain. With such units in every town and hamlet, the English people form a widespread web to trap an invader from any direction."

=== Canada ===
Throughout World War II, he continued to proselytize the need for a home guard in America, Canada and Great Britain, and to teach that guerrilla warfare was a key ingredient of an effective defense. He taught the Pacific Coast Militia Rangers in Canada, as he felt that they needed more than home grown expertise.

He was a trainer of forces at Nanaimo, Vancouver Island that were going to invade the Aleutian Islands in Operation Cottage.

=== World War II: later years ===
In 1943, Levy designed a combat knife, which he unsuccessfully tried to patent and market through the cutlers W. R. Case & Sons.

Subsequently, he returned to lecture in America as an advance party when Wintringham was invited to start an Osterley style school in San Bernardino. The school was abandoned when the two local Home Guard commanders shot each other during an argument. Levy gave a successful US lecture tour and had his face pictured on the cover of Life Magazine, proclaiming him as an Ace Guerrilla and having a multipage story titled How to be a Guerrilla. Later, he returned to the UK to form part of Wintringham's occasional 'flying squads' – mobile training units which toured provincial Home Guard units in temporary, often unofficial, training camps.

After appearing at Harvard University, where he was billed as an "Instructor in 'cad warfare' for the British Commandos, Levy spoke on his work to a mixed gathering of the Naval Supply Corps, Harvard ROTC, and students on Monday in the Stadium." He particularly emphasized the need for individual civilian warfare. He lectured on the Home Guard and the tactics of insurgency. The Harvard Crimson noted: ""Yank" expects to leave this country within a few days to return to Britain, where Goebbels has promised that he will be among the first to be shot when the Germans capture England."

The United States Infantry Journal called him the greatest instructor on defensive fighting. His life story was illustrated in a comic book entitled Jewish War Heroes, published by the Canadian Jewish Congress in January 1944.

His approach to asymmetrical warfare was seen by some as an unfortunate portent of post-World War II conflicts.

== Postwar career and legacy ==
In 1946, Levy sought to go to Palestine, filing a passport request with the U.S. federal government. His request was denied ostensibly because of potential diplomatic problems associated with his championing guerrilla warfare and "dirty tricks" that he taught to the Home Guard.

On April 15, 1954, he was pardoned by John S. Fine, the Governor of Pennsylvania, for his 1927 conviction for armed robbery. He had served six years of a 25–50 year sentence, before being deported to Canada, only later learning that he was an American citizen by birth, making the deportation illegal. His lawyer invoked Levy's chronic arthritis and penury, his law-abiding conduct with his wife and daughter in Los Angeles, and his list of good works in contributing to the war effort. The state parole board approved the petition for executive clemency, and then the governor. He was represented by Hanley Rubensohn, a Philadelphia attorney, who said that Levy wanted to wipe out the only blot on his record, so that he could live in peace. At the time of his pardon, Levy was in hospital. Medical expenses had consumed his earnings from lectures and book sales. His attorney for the pardon proceeding believed that Levy had been punished enough.

Levy suffered a heart attack in 1965 which led to his death and the derailment of a planned biography based on his memorabilia and correspondence, with writer Don Dwiggins; as of 2014, this source material survives in Los Angeles. In 2006, it was announced that an American writer, Todd Winer, was conducting research for a biography promising "fascinating reading, with Levy as a latter day Stephen Crane or Jack London." Levy was also covered in Liberty Magazine, November 21, 1942; American Rifleman, May 1942; Coronet, October 1942; and The Christian Science Monitor, June 17, 1942. The New York Times also carried an obituary on September 5, 1965. In 1965, researcher and author, Robert Emmett Johnson, corresponded with Levy about the latter's involvement in Nicaragua.

== Published works ==
- Guerrilla Warfare
  - 1942 | Penguin Special 102. Introduction by Tom Wintringham. Harmondsworth: Penguin. OCLC 989788466. (Note: Listed in "Penguin Specials 1938–1944: S1–S155" (University of the West of Scotland Library, 2006) as published in 1942. The book itself says "Published in Penguin Books 1941".)
  - 1942 | Full text. Melbourne: Lothian Publishing. (Note: On Penguin books published by Lothian, see "Penguins in Australia 1940–1946", Penguin First Editions.)
  - 1964 | Boulder: Panther Publications. OCLC 1559106.
  - 1964 | Full text. Introduction by Franklin Mark Osanka and "Editor's Notes" by Robert K. Brown. Boulder: Paladin Press. ISBN 0873640209. (Note: The copyright page both says "Copyright © 1964" and provides the ISBN; however, ISBNs were not introduced until 1967.)
  - 1968 | Arabic edition translated by Sami Kaaki. Beirut: House of Science for Millions / Dar Al-Adab.
  - 2008 | "An Infantry Journal Penguin Special." London: Penguin. ISBN 978-0141039275.

== See also ==
- Guerrilla Warfare by Che Guevara
- History of guerrilla warfare
- International Brigades order of battle
- Jewish Legion
- Jewish volunteers in the Spanish Civil War
- On Guerrilla Warfare by Mao Zedong
