= Guerrilla Warfare (Che Guevara book) =

1961 handbook by Che Guevara

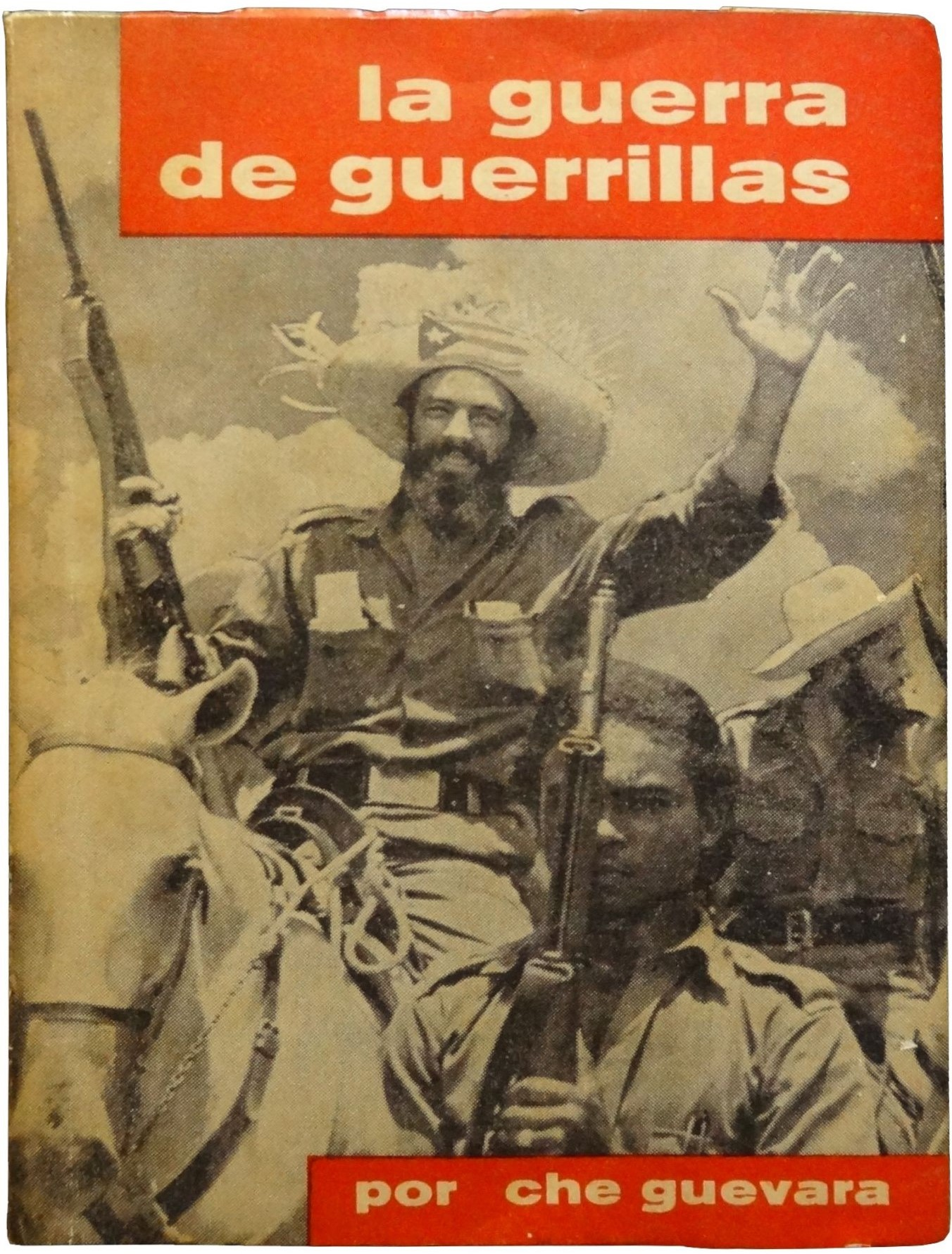
- Cover of the first original edition, 1961.
- Author: Che Guevara
- Language: Spanish, English (translation)
- Genre: History, Military Tactics, Revolutionary Ideology
- Publisher: New York: Monthly Review Press
- Publication date: 1961
- Media type: Print
- Pages: 175
- ISBN: 0-8032-7075-5

Guerrilla Warfare (Spanish: La Guerra de Guerrillas) is a military handbook written by Marxist–Leninist revolutionary Che Guevara. Published in 1961 following the Cuban Revolution, it became a reference for thousands of guerrilla fighters in various countries around the world. The book draws upon Guevara's personal experience as a guerrilla soldier during the Cuban Revolution, generalizing for readers who would undertake guerrilla warfare in their own countries.

The book identifies reasons and prerequisites for, and lessons of, guerrilla warfare. The principal reason to conduct guerrilla warfare within a country is because all peaceful and legal means of recourse have been exhausted. The most important prerequisite for conducting guerrilla warfare in a country is the popular support of its people for the guerrilla army. Guevara asserted that the success of the Cuban Revolution provided three lessons: popular forces can win a war against a regular army, guerrillas can create their own favorable conditions (not needing to wait for ideal conditions to take shape), and in the underdeveloped parts of the Americas, the basic place of operation for a guerrilla army is the countryside.

== Themes ==
Guerrilla Warfare is a manual for left-wing insurgency which draws upon Guevara's experience in the Cuban Revolution. It elaborates the foco theory (foquismo) of revolution in which the guerrilla operates as a vanguard, taking initiative to make revolution without waiting for ideal conditions to present themselves. Although the text has been compared to Mao Zedong's On Guerrilla Warfare, Guevara claimed not to have read Mao's book. Guerrilla Warfare was influenced by two books from the Spanish Civil War: Nuevas Guerras and Medicina contra invasión.

South African revolutionaries read the work in the early 1960s; former Minister of Intelligence Ronnie Kasrils noted that the apartheid regime's police questioned his late wife about an order of "Che Guevara's book on guerrilla warfare."

=== Pro-Guerrilla ===
Guerrilla warfare is presented as a feasible method of communist revolution. Guevara states that the "three fundamental lessons" of the Cuban Revolution are:

1) Popular forces can win a war against the army.

2) It is not necessary to wait until all conditions for making revolution exist; the insurrection can create them.

3) In underdeveloped America, the countryside is the basic area for armed fighting.

=== Social Reform ===
In Guevara's treatment, a guerrilla is not merely a soldier, but a committed social reformer who fights for a cause, a disciplined ascetic. The guerrilla should set the example which will inspire followers, forging solidarity with the peasantry: "The peasant must always be helped technically, economically, morally, and culturally. The guerrilla fighter will be a sort of guiding angel."

=== Combat ===
The book describes various forms of combat between guerrilla bands and regular armies; tactics include hit-and-run strikes, protracted combat at a distance, and sabotage. Guevara stresses that his specific Cuban examples should be adapted as local circumstances vary.

== Synopsis ==
Guerrilla Warfare is divided into seven parts:

- an opening dedication to Camilo Cienfuegos, Guevara's friend and fellow revolutionary, who died shortly before the book was completed,
- three chapters (in 21 sections) which form the body of the work,
- a chapter of two appendices (in two sections),
- and finally, an epilogue which gives an appraisal of Cuba's then-current political situation, as it stood in 1961, following the revolution.

A section-by-section synopsis of the book is given below.

=== Dedication to Camilo ===
Guevara dedicates the book to Camilo Cienfuegos, "who was to have read and corrected it when another destiny intervened." Cienfuegos is described as a good friend and model revolutionary.

=== Chapter I: General Principles of Guerrilla Warfare ===
The book's first chapter describes the nature, strategy, and tactics of guerrilla warfare, with reference to its employment in the case of the Cuban Revolution.

==== 1. Essence of Guerrilla Warfare ====
As the success of the Cuban Revolution has demonstrated, guerrilla warfare is a feasible method for making communist revolution against regular national armies. The Cuban example provides three lessons: 1) popular forces can defeat a regular army, 2) warfare can begin immediately, creating its own favorable conditions, and does not need to wait for theoretical "ideal" conditions, and 3) in underdeveloped America, the countryside is the basic theater of conflict. There are also prerequisites to such an armed conflict. It must be clear to the guerrillas that all peaceful or civil means of recourse have been exhausted, and the guerrillas must also have the popular support of the people. Without the latter, this mode of warfare is untenable. The Chinese Long March is another instructive example of countryside operations of communist guerrillas.

==== 2. Guerrilla Strategy ====
In the opening phases of war, the guerrillas must concentrate on staying alive and making small strikes against the enemy, to steadily weaken it. As the force gains in numbers and friendly territory, it must split into new groups, encircling the enemy and repeating the process. Eventually, the force will change to resemble a regular army in numbers and discipline, at which point it can finally annihilate the enemy and achieve victory, the object of warfare.

==== 3. Guerrilla Tactics ====
Due to the asymmetry between the guerrillas and the regular army, the guerrillas are obliged to employ certain tactics, especially in the beginning. The guerrillas must have high mobility, in order to avoid being drawn into conventional battle with numerically superior forces. They should also routinely operate at night, and open battles with surprise attack. Sabotage of enemy supply chains is also necessary—sabotage is distinguished from terrorism, which should not be employed except in the most extreme circumstances (e.g. killing a high-value enemy target), as the latter tactic may claim innocent lives, and provoke a disproportionate reprisal.

==== 4. Warfare on Favorable Ground ====
For the guerrillas, favorable ground is difficult ground with which they are familiar—examples can include mountains and forests. Places of refuge should be established in favorable ground, but the guerrillas must regularly venture out to engage the enemy in battle. In the case of the Cuban Revolution, useful weapons included the M1 Garand rifle, the Belgian FAL, and the M14. As the guerrilla army grows, its first light manufacturing efforts should be directed towards weapons and shoes.

==== 5. Warfare on Unfavorable Ground ====
On the other hand, guerrilla operation on unfavorable ground—such as plains and developed areas—requires certain adjustments in tactics. Units operating on such ground must have even higher mobility, and consequently their size should not exceed fifteen people. One advantage of operation on unfavorable ground is the greater opportunity for procurement of supplies. Guerrillas must always replenish their weapons and ammunition at every opportunity, and understand that their enemy is the primary source of armament.

==== 6. Suburban Warfare ====
Once the war has advanced toward the cities, suburban warfare becomes possible as a form of support operation. The suburban zone is an extreme example of unfavorable ground, and guerrillas operating there will usually confine themselves to supportive sabotage, always under a central command.

=== Chapter II: The Guerrilla Band ===
The second chapter describes the daily life of the guerrilla fighter, including political beliefs, daily supply and transportation concerns, military discipline, and battle.

==== 1. The Guerrilla Fighter: Social Reformer ====
The guerrilla is not merely a soldier, but must also model the cause for which he fights, in his views and personal conduct. This means that he must be personally convinced that his enemy upholds an oppressive and unjust society, which must be overthrown through revolution. It also means that he must be an effective communicator with the peasantry, for whom he fights and upon whom he relies for support.

==== 2. The Guerrilla Fighter as Combatant ====
Due to the difficulty of his task, the guerrilla must be extremely robust, both mentally and physically. He must be able to sleep in the open, go without food for several days when necessary, and carry all of his supplies on his back. A guerrilla's basic pack includes clothing, shoes, a knapsack, a hammock with nylon roof, a weapon, a canteen, spare food (canned), and soap.

==== 3. Organization of a Guerrilla Band ====
Units of guerrillas can be organized for operation in several different ways; the choice of formation is a function of the local situation. In one example, five units may move quietly in a column at night, each reinforcing their adjacent members. In the Cuban case, one useful adapted weapon consisted of a Molotov cocktail projectile affixed to a 16 gauge sawed-off shotgun. This improvised weapon became known as the "M-16" (not to be confused with the M16 rifle).

==== 4. The Combat ====
Actual combat may take many forms. The enemy may be encircled, or it may simply be goaded on and weakened through sporadic fire. In specific circumstances, it is possible to capture an enemy outpost. What is essential to all forms of combat is the necessity for the guerrilla to replenish arms and ammunition through engagement with the enemy.

==== 5. Beginning, Development, and End of a Guerrilla War ====
Drawing again upon the Cuban example, a guerrilla force starts small, and grows. In addition to its military operations, it eventually develops its own manufacturing capabilities, and establishes its own jurisprudence and governmental administration within its own controlled territory, thereby approximating a state. At this advanced stage of development, the guerrilla army-and-state develops into a symmetrical force which can achieve victory over its enemy.

=== Chapter III: Organization of the Guerrilla Front ===
The third chapter describes the daily life in the friendly territory inhabited by the guerrilla fighter, and details its various support activities for a war effort.

==== 1. Supply ====
As the guerrillas establish control in given areas, a supply chain must be established to satisfy all of the force's needs, particularly food, salt, and leather for shoes. Peasant farmers can give a portion of their work product to the guerrillas, and supply caches should be stored throughout the countryside. Mules are excellent beasts of burden for guerrilla needs, both because they can shoulder heavy loads, and also because they can traverse the rough ground which is the guerrilla's native territory. If there is enough social cohesion between the guerrillas and the peasants, taxes can also be levied.

==== 2. Civil Organization ====
In order to keep trust with the peasants, guerrillas must also establish forms of civil government in the friendly areas, to administer justice and de facto solutions for day-to-day problems, functions no longer performed in the zone by the alienated enemy state.

==== 3. The Role of the Woman ====
Women's capacity to contribute to a guerrilla effort should not be underestimated, and contrary to popular belief, their presence in a unit does not cause sexual tension. Women can conduct combat, and are especially useful as messengers, because they have greater freedom of movement in hostile territory than single men do. Women can also assist as cooks and nurses.

==== 4. Medical Problems ====
Doctors and medical personnel can assist the guerrilla effort in three capacities, which are a function of the growth and sophistication of the guerrilla territory. In the first case, doctors must fight alongside the guerrillas, operating as field medics. As territory expands, it is possible to establish medics at safe houses. Upon further expansion of the guerrilla territory, it is possible to establish legitimate hospital facilities, with proper equipment and infrastructure.

==== 5. Sabotage ====
Sabotage, again distinguished from terrorism, is an important adjunct activity in war, alongside direct combat. Important targets include supply lines (railroads), infrastructure (bridges, which can be destroyed using dynamite) and communications (telecommunication lines can be crippled by felling a single pole).

==== 6. War Industry ====
The developed guerrilla territory must begin to perform its own legitimate manufacturing; again, essential manufacturing processes for the war effort include shoe production and repair, weapons production and repair in an armory, and salt manufacturing.

==== 7. Propaganda ====
Propaganda must also be disseminated both inside and outside the guerrilla territory; appropriate media include newspapers and radio.

==== 8. Intelligence ====
Good intelligence is essential to obtain before engaging in any battle, and it may be acquired from friendly peasants, or by eavesdropping on the enemy. Again, women make particularly good spies for this sort of intelligence gathering.

==== 9. Training and Indoctrination ====
In its early stages, the war itself and its experience will train the guerrillas; only at later stages does it become feasible to establish dedicated training camps for new recruits. Training must include marksmanship and political indoctrination.

==== 10. The Organizational Structure of the Army of a Revolutionary Movement ====
Like a regular army, a guerrilla army must also have a clear chain of command, and military discipline. When a punishment is deemed necessary, it must be painful. The reason for this is that guerrillas, unlike regular armies, are already accustomed to extreme daily hardships. However, such a punishment need not be physical: for example, depriving a guerrilla of his weapon can wound his pride and motivate the desired corrected behavior.

=== Appendices ===
Two appendices further detail guerrilla military operations.

==== 1. Organization in Secret of the First Guerrilla Band ====
Before the first guerrilla group commences its military operations, careful planning is essential. Bases, safe houses and supply caches must be established at multiple locations, and information must be tightly controlled and specialized among a few people, with no one knowing all details of military operation, so that it will be impossible for all secrets to be obtained by the enemy in the event that a given person is captured and tortured. The guerrillas must also physically disperse themselves throughout the countryside, so as not to call attention to themselves.

==== 2. Defense of Power that has been Won ====
Following the defeat of the enemy army at the national level, care must also be taken to retain the political power which has been won. To counter an unfriendly international press, the war effort must continue to disseminate its own propaganda. Further, the whole cultural and military apparatus of the previous regime must be completely swept away, so that soldiers of the old army and their sympathizers cannot rise up again.

=== Epilogue ===
The book closes with an epilogue which explicitly treats the Cuban political situation as it existed shortly after the revolution, in 1961.

==== Analysis of the Cuban Situation, its Present and its Future ====
The epilogue details certain laws, entities and policies which were established in Cuba following the revolution, including the agrarian reform law and the INRA. The revolution's detrimental impact on the United Fruit Company and other capitalist interests are also mentioned. Although he identifies the United States as an enemy, Guevara closes with optimism for the future of Cuba.

== Reception ==
=== Foreign military involvement ===
While the book was intended for other revolutionary movements in Latin America, Africa, and Asia, it was also studied by counter-revolutionary military schools.

With the success of Che's military campaign in Cuba and the spread of communism in Latin America, U.S. military activity increased throughout the region. The U.S. military adopted some of Che's own tactics in order to better combat guerrilla fighters in the jungle. This entailed U.S. military training throughout Latin America in order to counteract the spreading of guerrilla movements throughout the region (for historical context on United States foreign policy in Latin America, see the Good Neighbor policy). Che faced the results of this training in his disastrous Bolivian Campaign, in which most of the ELN rebels led by him were killed and Che himself was executed.

=== Reviews ===
The book attracted analysis and criticism:

The basic and final thesis is that guerrilla warfare can be successful only when the population is in favour of the guerrilleros and is willing to aid and shelter them.

— Renzo Sereno

Aside from Che's own compelling rhetoric, each of the case histories demonstrates his influence and the application of his analysis in very specific terms.

— Wayne Clegern

== See also ==
- Armed Insurrection
- Guerilla warfare
- History of the Central Intelligence Agency
- Yank Levy, author of an earlier book of the same name
- Polack, Peter. Guerrilla Warfare: Kings of Revolution. Casemate. ISBN 9781612006758.
