= On Guerrilla Warfare (Mao Zedong book) =

1937 book by Mao Zedong

- Title page for On Guerrilla Warfare (1961 edition)
- Author: Mao Zedong
- Original title: 游击战
- Translator: Samuel B. Griffith
- Published: 1937
- Publication place: China
- Text: On Guerrilla Warfare at Wikisource

On Guerrilla Warfare (simplified Chinese: 抗日游击战争的一般问题; traditional Chinese: 抗日游擊戰爭的一般問題; pinyin: Kàngrì yóu jí zhànzhēng de yībān wèntí) is Mao Zedong's case for the extensive use of an irregular form of warfare in which small groups of combatants use mobile military tactics in the forms of ambushes and raids to combat a larger and less mobile formal army. Mao wrote the book in 1937 to convince Chinese political and military leaders that guerrilla style-tactics were necessary for the Chinese to use in the Second Sino-Japanese War. Despite its international fame, the book was not included in the canonical Selected Works of Mao Tse-tung.

== Overview ==
=== Chapter 1: What is Guerrilla Warfare? ===
Mao states that guerrilla warfare is "a powerful special weapon with which we resist the Japanese and without which we cannot defeat them." Mao explains how guerrilla warfare can only succeed if employed by revolutionaries because it is a political and military style. According to Mao, guerrilla warfare is a way for the Chinese to expel an intruder that has more arms, equipment, and troops.

=== Chapter 2: The Relation of Guerrilla Hostilities to Regular Operations ===
"A primary feature of guerrilla operations is their dependence upon the people themselves to organize battalions and other units." In Chapter 2, Mao explains the differences and the relationship between guerrilla and regular troops. Guerrilla warfare needs to be decentralized to allow quickness and detachment. However, orthodox troops can temporarily adopt guerrilla strategy and vice versa.

=== Chapter 3: Guerrilla Warfare in History ===
Mao refers to a bevy of wars from different continents to support his belief that guerrilla warfare is necessary to expel more powerful potential conquerors. He refers specifically to Russian resistance during the French invasion of Russia and the Abyssinians' failures to resist Italian aggression in the Second Italo-Abyssinian War. He also makes reference to the use of guerrilla tactics in the Sanyuanli incident during the First Opium War, the Taiping Rebellion, and the Boxer Uprising. He also states that guerrilla warfare cannot succeed on its own without orthodox warfare. The two should work together in an effort to defeat a larger, stronger enemy.

=== Chapter 4: Can Victory be Attained by Guerrilla Operations? ===
Mao explains that Japan's military efforts do not have complete citizen and soldier support. He believes that China can defeat the enemy if they use guerrilla warfare and extend the duration of the war.

=== Chapter 5: Organization for Guerrilla Warfare ===
Mao describes different types of guerrilla units. Some are formed from the masses without any detailed direction from the top. These units are critical to successful insurgency. Guerrilla units should learn to be independent of higher leadership because they may need to function without it. "The most important natural quality is that of complete loyalty to the idea of the people’s emancipation. If this is present, the others will develop; if it is not present, nothing can be done." The regular rebel army can support these local units in various ways.

=== Chapter 6: The Political Problems of Guerrilla Warfare ===
Mao explains the inalienable political aspects of guerrilla warfare and any warfare in general. "Military action is a method used to attain a political goal. While military action and political affairs are not identical, it is impossible to isolate one from the other." Chinese guerrilla soldiers must be self-disciplined and committed to the revolutionary cause or the effort will fail. Soldiers must sacrifice some democratic privileges in the effort to defeat the Japanese.

=== Chapter 7: The Strategy of Guerrilla Resistance against Japan ===
Mao explains that guerrilla troops should have no conception of defense or battle lines. They should attack orthodox Japanese troops from the front, the sides, and the rear. Guerrilla troops should always dictate the timing of conflicts with the enemy. They should be prepared to flee if need be.

== See also ==
- Fundamentals of Guerrilla Warfare
