= Prussian Army =

Land forces of Prussia (1701–1919)

- Königlich Preußische Armee
- War ensign of Kingdom of Prussia, Royal Prussian Army
- Active: 1701–1919
- Country: Kingdom of Prussia
- Allegiance: House of Hohenzollern
- Branch: Army
- Type: Land forces
- Size: Ranging between 70,000 and 700,000 during the period.
- Garrison/HQ: Potsdam
- Patron: King of Prussia
- Engagements: See list: War of the Spanish Succession; War of the Polish Succession; Great Northern War; War of the Austrian Succession; • First Silesian War; • Second Silesian War; Seven Years' War; • Third Silesian War; War of the Bavarian Succession; French Revolutionary Wars; • First Coalition; Napoleonic Wars; • Fourth Coalition (1806–1807); • French Invasion of Russia (1812); • Sixth Coalition; • Seventh Coalition; German revolutions of 1848–1849; First Schleswig War; Second Schleswig War; Austro-Prussian War (1866); Franco-Prussian War (1870–1871); World War I (1914–1918)

Commanders
- Notable commanders: See list: Frederick William I; Duke Ferdinand of Brunswick-Wolfenbüttel; Leopold I, Prince of Anhalt-Dessau; Frederick the Great; Friedrich Wilhelm von Seydlitz; Gerhard von Scharnhorst; Gebhard Leberecht von Blücher; Ludwig Yorck von Wartenburg; Friedrich Wilhelm Freiherr von Bülow; August Neidhardt von Gneisenau; Carl von Clausewitz; Friedrich Graf Kleist von Nollendorf; Kaiser Wilhelm I; Moltke the Elder; Albrecht von Roon; Friedrich Karl; Frederick Francis II; Karl Friedrich von Steinmetz; August Karl von Goeben; Eduard von Fransecky; Paul von Hindenburg; August von Mackensen; Erich Ludendorff; Erich von Falkenhayn

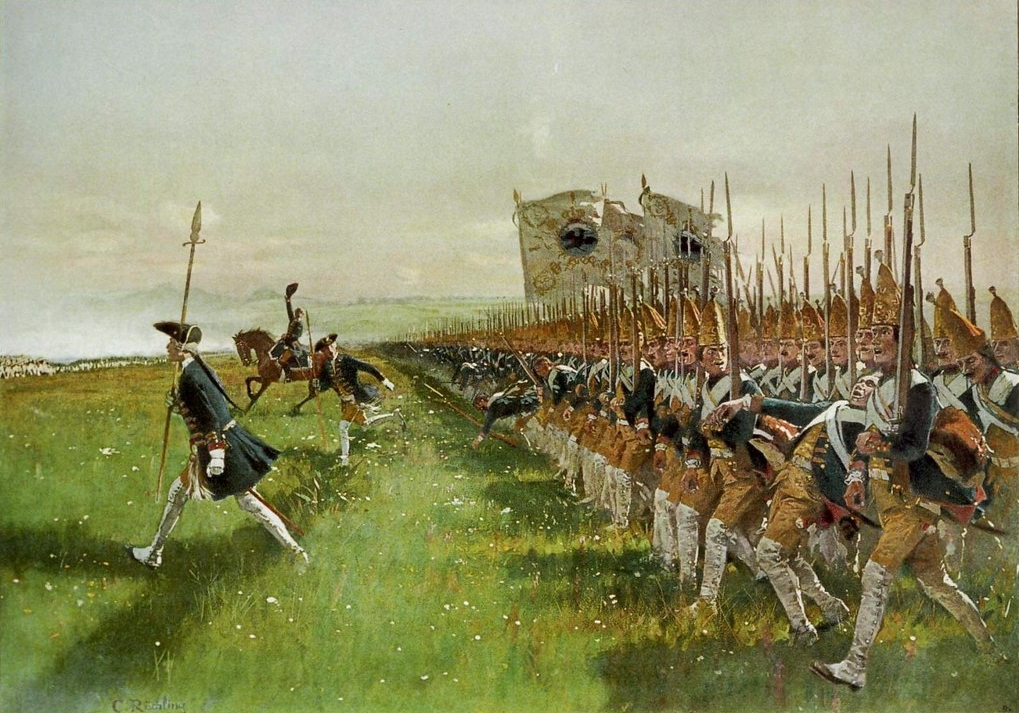
Attack of Prussian Infantry, 4 June 1745, by Carl Röchling

The Royal Prussian Army (1701–1919, German: Königlich Preußische Armee) served as the army of the Kingdom of Prussia. It became vital to the development of Prussia as a European political and military power and within Germany.

The Royal Prussian Army had its roots in the core mercenary forces of Brandenburg–Prussia during the long religious strife of the Thirty Years' War of 1618–1648. Elector Frederick William (1620–1688, reigned 1640–1688), developed it into a viable standing army, while King Frederick William I of Prussia (1688–1740, reigned 1713–1740), dramatically increased its size and improved its doctrines. King Frederick the Great (1712–1786, reigned 1740–1786), a formidable battle commander, led the disciplined Prussian troops to victory during the 18th century Silesian Wars and greatly increased the prestige and military reputation throughout Europe and among the hodge-podge array of various German states kingdoms, duchies, principalities and free cities of the leadership in the East of the rising Kingdom of Prussia.

However the Prussian Army had become outdated and under-resourced decades later by the beginning of the late 18th century into the early 19th century era to meet the challenge from the west beginning in the political and social upheaval in the French Revolution of 1789–1793, overthrowing of the French monarchy, execution of Louis XVI, and the Royal House of Bourbon. The continuing strife spilling over French borders of the following French Revolutionary Wars (1792–1802), and then the Napoleonic Wars, and rise of the First French Empire of France under Napoleon I (1769–1821), defeated Prussia in the War of the Fourth Coalition in 1806–1807.

However, under the subsequent leadership of Gerhard von Scharnhorst (1755–1814), Prussian military reformers began modernizing the Royal Prussian Army, which contributed greatly to the later final defeat and exile of Napoleon I during the War of the Sixth Coalition. Conservatives halted some of the reforms, however, and the Prussian Army subsequently became a bulwark of the conservative Prussian royal government.

In the 19th century, the Prussian Army fought successful wars against Kingdom of Denmark in the Second Schleswig War of 1864; versus the Austrian Empire (Austria) in the Austro-Prussian War of 1866; and the Franco-Prussian War of 1870–1871 with the Second French Empire of France, led by Emperor Napoleon III; which allowing Prussia to lead and dominate in the Unification of Germany, establishing the German Empire in 1871. The Royal Prussian Army formed the core of the new larger Imperial German Army, which was replaced by the Reichswehr after the defeat in World War I (1914–1918), in the Weimar Republic (the first German republic) during the 1920s and early 1930s.

== The Great Elector ==
=== Creation of the army ===
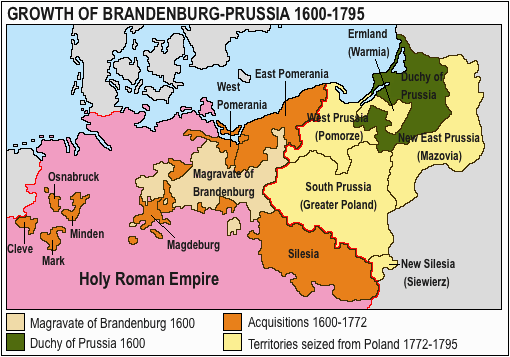
Growth of Brandenburg-Prussia, 1600–1795

The army of Prussia grew out of the united armed forces created during the reign of Elector Frederick William of Brandenburg (1640–1688). Hohenzollern Brandenburg-Prussia had primarily relied upon Landsknecht mercenaries during the Thirty Years' War, in which Brandenburg was devastated. Swedish and Imperial forces occupied the country. In the spring of 1644, Frederick William started building a standing army through conscription to better defend his state.

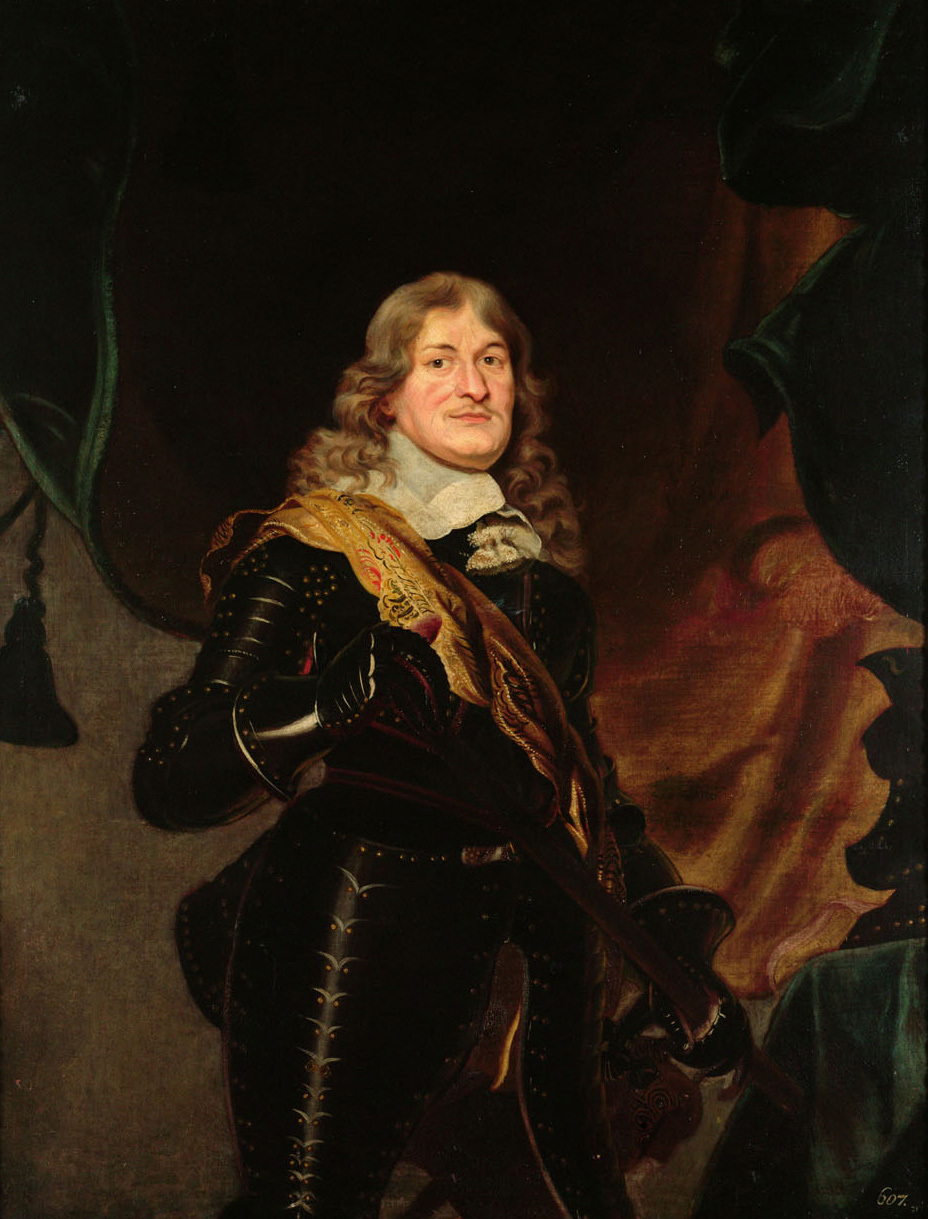
Frederick William, the Great Elector

By 1643–44, the developing army numbered only 5,500 troops, including 500 musketeers in Frederick William's bodyguard. The elector's confidant Johann von Norprath recruited forces in the Duchy of Cleves and organized an army of 3,000 Dutch and German soldiers in the Rhineland by 1646. Garrisons were also slowly augmented in Brandenburg and the Duchy of Prussia. Frederick William sought assistance from France, the traditional rival of Habsburg Austria, and began receiving French subsidies. He based his reforms on those of Louvois, the War Minister of King Louis XIV. The growth of his army allowed Frederick William to achieve considerable territorial acquisitions in the 1648 Treaty of Westphalia, despite Brandenburg's relative lack of success during the war.

The provincial estates desired a reduction in the army's size during peacetime, but the elector avoided their demands through political concessions, evasion and economy. In the 1653 Brandenburg Recess between Frederick William and the estates of Brandenburg, the nobility provided the sovereign with 530,000 thalers in return for affirmation of their privileges. The Junkers thus cemented their political power at the expense of the peasantry. Once the elector and his army were strong enough, Frederick William was able to suppress the estates of Cleves, Mark and Prussia.

Frederick William attempted to professionalize his soldiers during a time when mercenaries were the norm. In addition to individually creating regiments and appointing colonels, the elector imposed harsh punishments for transgressions, such as punishing by hanging for looting, and running the gauntlet for desertion. Acts of violence by officers against civilians resulted in decommission for a year. He developed a cadet institution for the nobility; although the upper class was resistant to the idea in the short term, the integration of the nobility into the officer corps allied them with the Hohenzollern monarchy in the long term. Field Marshals of Brandenburg-Prussia included Derfflinger, John George II, Spaen and Sparr. The elector's troops traditionally were organized into disconnected provincial forces. In 1655, Frederick William began the unification of the various detachments by placing them under Sparr's overall command. Unification also increased through the appointment of Generalkriegskommissar Platen as head of supplies. These measures decreased the authority of the primarily mercenary colonels who had been so prominent during the Thirty Years' War.

=== Campaigns of the Great Elector ===
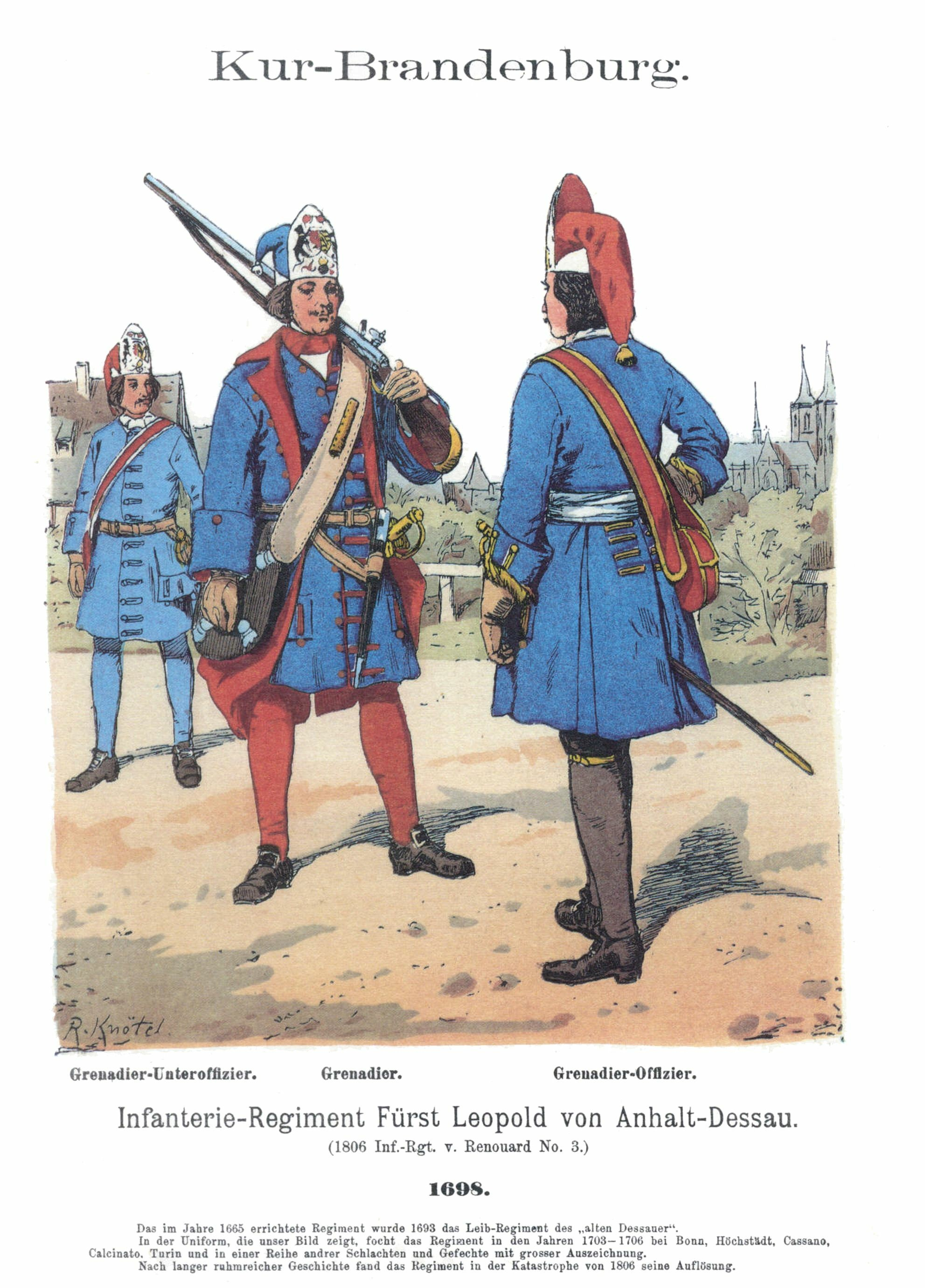
Brandenburg troops of the infantry regiment of Leopold I, Prince of Anhalt-Dessau in 1698, by Richard Knötel

Brandenburg-Prussia's new army survived its trial by fire through victory in the 1656 Battle of Warsaw, during the Northern Wars. Observers were impressed with the discipline of the Brandenburger troops, as well as their treatment of civilians, which was considered more humane than that of their allies, the Swedish Army. Hohenzollern success enabled Frederick William to assume full sovereignty over the Duchy of Prussia in the 1657 Treaty of Wehlau, by which Brandenburg-Prussia allied itself with the Polish–Lithuanian Commonwealth. Despite having expelled Swedish forces from the territory, the elector did not acquire Vorpommern in the 1660 Treaty of Oliva, as the balance of power had been restored.

In the early 1670s, Frederick William supported Imperial attempts to reclaim Alsace and counter the expansion of Louis XIV. Swedish troops invaded Brandenburg in 1674 while the bulk of the elector's forces were in Franconia's winter quarters. In 1675 Frederick William marched his troops northward and surrounded Wrangel's troops. The elector achieved his greatest victory in the Battle of Fehrbellin; although a minor battle, it brought fame to the Brandenburg-Prussian Army and gave Frederick William the nickname "the Great Elector". After Sweden invaded Prussia in late 1678, Frederick William's forces expelled the Swedish invaders during the "Great Sleigh Drive" of 1678–79; Thomas Carlyle compared the wintertime Swedish retreat to that of Napoleon from Moscow.

Frederick William built the Hohenzollern army up to a peacetime size of 7,000 and a wartime size of 15,000–30,000. Its success in battle against Sweden and Poland increased Brandenburg-Prussia's prestige, while also allowing the Great Elector to pursue absolutist policies against estates and towns. In his political testament of 1667, the elector wrote, "Alliances, to be sure, are good, but forces of one's own still better. Upon them one can rely with more security, and a lord is of no consideration if he does not have means and troops of his own".

The growing power of the Hohenzollerns in Berlin led Frederick William's son and successor, Elector Frederick III (1688–1713), to proclaim the Kingdom of Prussia with himself as King Frederick I in 1701. Although he emphasized Baroque opulence and the arts in imitation of Versailles, the new king recognized that the importance of the army and continued its expansion to 40,000 men.

== The Soldier-King ==
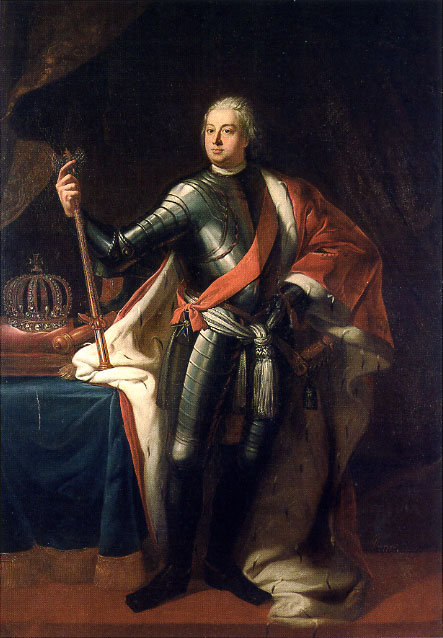
Frederick William I, the Soldier-King, painting by Samuel Theodor Gericke

Frederick I was succeeded by his son, Frederick William I (1713–1740), the "Soldier-King" obsessed with the army and achieving self-sufficiency for his country. The new king dismissed most of the artisans from his father's court and granted military officers precedence over court officials. Ambitious and intelligent young men began to enter the military instead of law and administration. Conscription among the peasantry was more firmly enforced, based on the Swedish model. Frederick William I wore his simple blue military uniform at court, a style henceforth imitated by the rest of the Prussian court and his royal successors. In Prussia, pigtails replaced the full-bottomed wigs common at most German courts.

Frederick William I had begun his military innovations in his Kronprinz regiment during the War of the Spanish Succession. His friend, Leopold I, Prince of Anhalt-Dessau, served as the royal drill sergeant for the Prussian Army. Leopold introduced the iron ramrod, increasing Prussian firepower, and the slow march, or goose-step. He also vastly increased the role of music in the Army, dedicating a large number of musician-troops, especially drummers and fifers, to use music for increasing morale in battle. The usefulness of music in battles was first recognized in the Thirty Years' War by the Brandenburger and Swedish armies. The new king trained and drilled the army relentlessly, focusing on their flintlock muskets' firing speed and formation maneuverability. The changes gave the army flexibility, precision, and a rate of fire that was mostly unequalled for that period. Through drilling and the iron ramrod, each soldier was expected to fire six times a minute, three times as fast as most armies.

Punishments were draconian in nature, such as running the gauntlet, and despite the threat of hanging, many peasant conscripts deserted when they could. Uniforms and weaponry were standardized. Pigtails and, in those regiments which wore it, facial hair were to be of uniform length within a regiment; soldiers who could not adequately grow beards or moustaches were expected to paint an outline on their faces.

Frederick William I reduced the size of Frederick I's gaudy royal guard to a single regiment, a troop of taller-than-average soldiers known as the Potsdam Giants or more commonly the Lange Kerls (long fellows), which he privately funded. The cavalry was reorganized into 55 squadrons of 150 horses; the infantry was turned into 50 battalions (25 regiments); and the artillery consisted of two battalions. These changes allowed him to increase the army from 39,000 to 45,000 troops; by the end of Frederick William I's reign, the army had doubled in size. The General War Commissary, responsible for the army and revenue, was removed from interference by the estates and placed strictly under the control of officials appointed by the king.

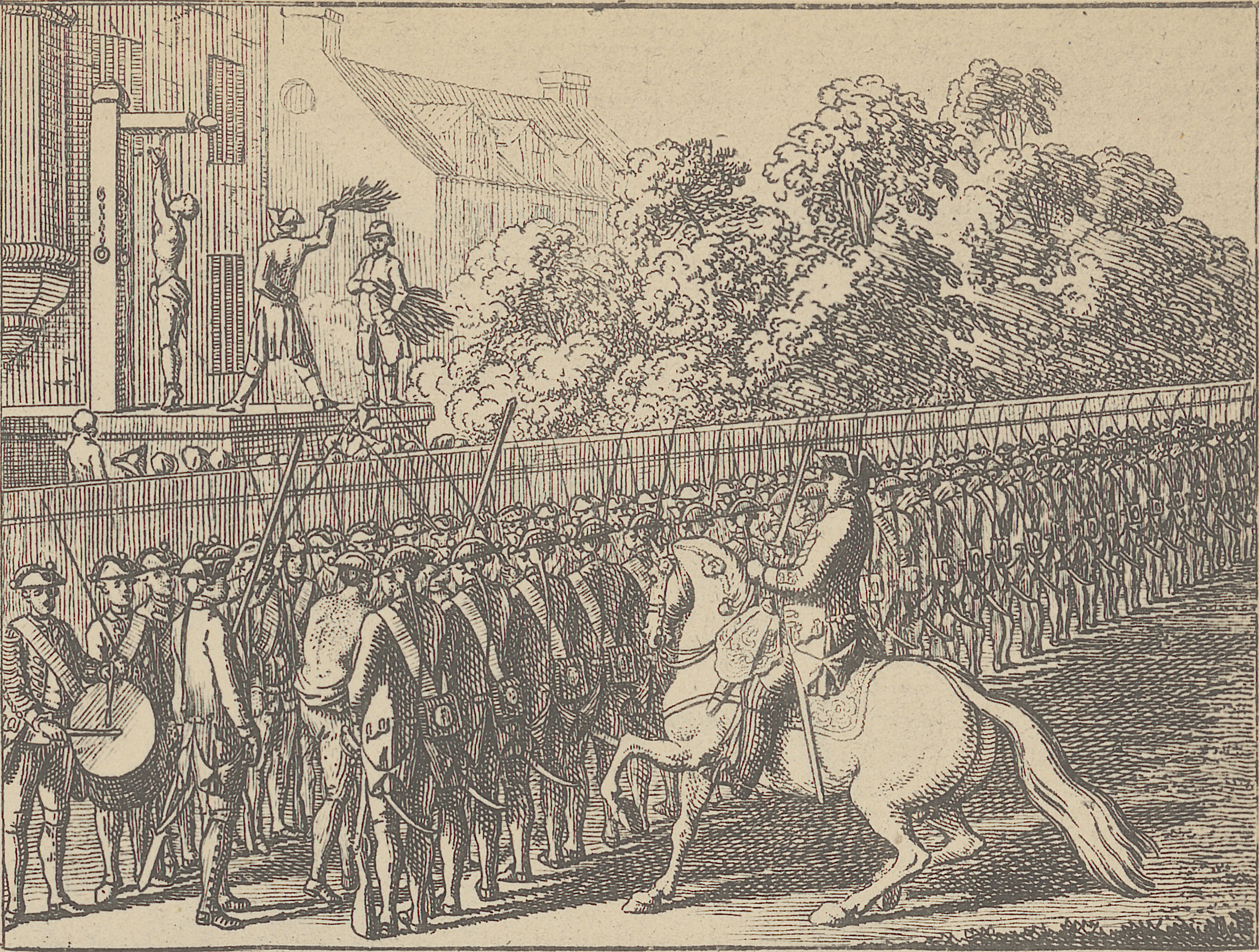
Running the gauntlet in the Prussian army

Frederick William I restricted enrollment in the officer corps to Germans of noble descent and compelled the Junkers, the Prussian landed aristocracy, to serve in the army, Although initially reluctant about the army, the nobles eventually saw the officer corps as its natural profession. Until 1730 the common soldiers consisted largely of serfs recruited or impressed from Brandenburg, Pomerania and East Prussia, leading many to flee to neighboring countries. In order to halt this trend, Frederick William I divided Prussia into regimental cantons. Every youth was required to serve as a soldier in these recruitment districts for three months each year; this met agrarian needs and added troops to bolster the regular ranks.

The General Directory which developed during Frederick William I's reign continued the absolutist tendencies of his grandfather and collected the increased taxes necessary for the expanded military. The middle class of the towns was required to quarter soldiers and enroll in the bureaucracy. Because the excise tax was only applied in towns, the king was reluctant to engage in war, as deployment of his expensive army in foreign lands would have deprived him of taxes from the town-based military.

By the end of Frederick William I's reign, Prussia had the fourth-largest army (80,000 soldiers) in Europe but was twelfth in population size (2.5 million). This led to the famous quote of Voltaire: Where some states have an army, the Prussian Army has a state. The army was maintained with a budget of five million thalers (out of a total state budget of seven million thalers).

== Frederick the Great ==
=== Silesian Wars ===
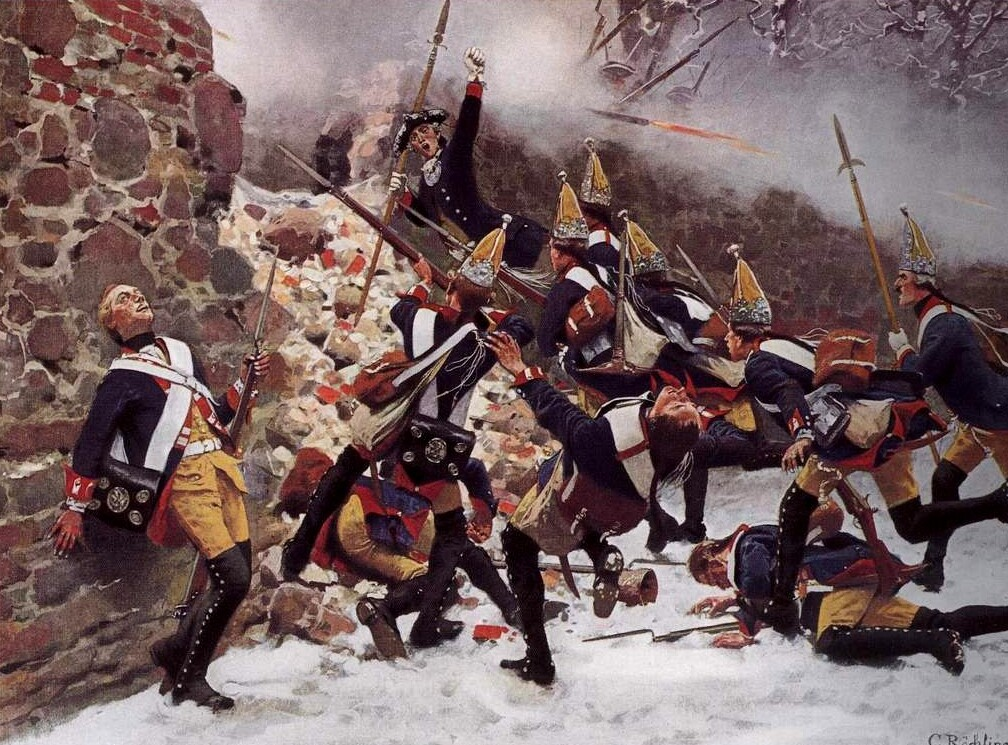
Storming of the breach by Prussian troops during the Battle of Leuthen, 1757, by Carl Röchling

Frederick William I was succeeded by his son, Frederick II (1740–86). Frederick immediately disbanded the expensive Potsdam Giants and used their funding to create seven new regiments and 10,000 troops. The new king also added sixteen battalions, five squadrons of hussars, and a squadron of life guards.

Disregarding the Pragmatic Sanction, Frederick began the Silesian Wars shortly after taking the throne. Although the inexperienced king retreated from the battle, the Prussian Army achieved victory over Austria in the Battle of Mollwitz (1741) under the leadership of Field Marshal Schwerin. The Prussian cavalry under Schulenburg had performed poorly at Mollwitz; the cuirassiers, originally trained on heavy horses, were subsequently retrained on more maneuverable, lighter horses. The hussars and dragoons of General Zieten were also expanded. These changes led to a Prussian victory at Chotusitz (1742) in Bohemia, and Austria conceded Silesia to Frederick with the Peace of Breslau.

In September 1743, Frederick held the first fall maneuver (Herbstübung). The different branches of the Army tested new formations and tactics; the fall maneuvers became annual traditions of the Prussian Army. Austria tried to reclaim Silesia in the Second Silesian War. Although successful in outmaneuvering Frederick in 1744, the Austrians were crushed by the king himself in the Battle of Hohenfriedberg and the Battle of Soor (1745). The Prussian cavalry excelled during the battle, especially the Zieten Hussars. For his great services at Hohenfriedberg Hans Karl von Winterfeldt, a good friend of King Frederick, rose to prominence.

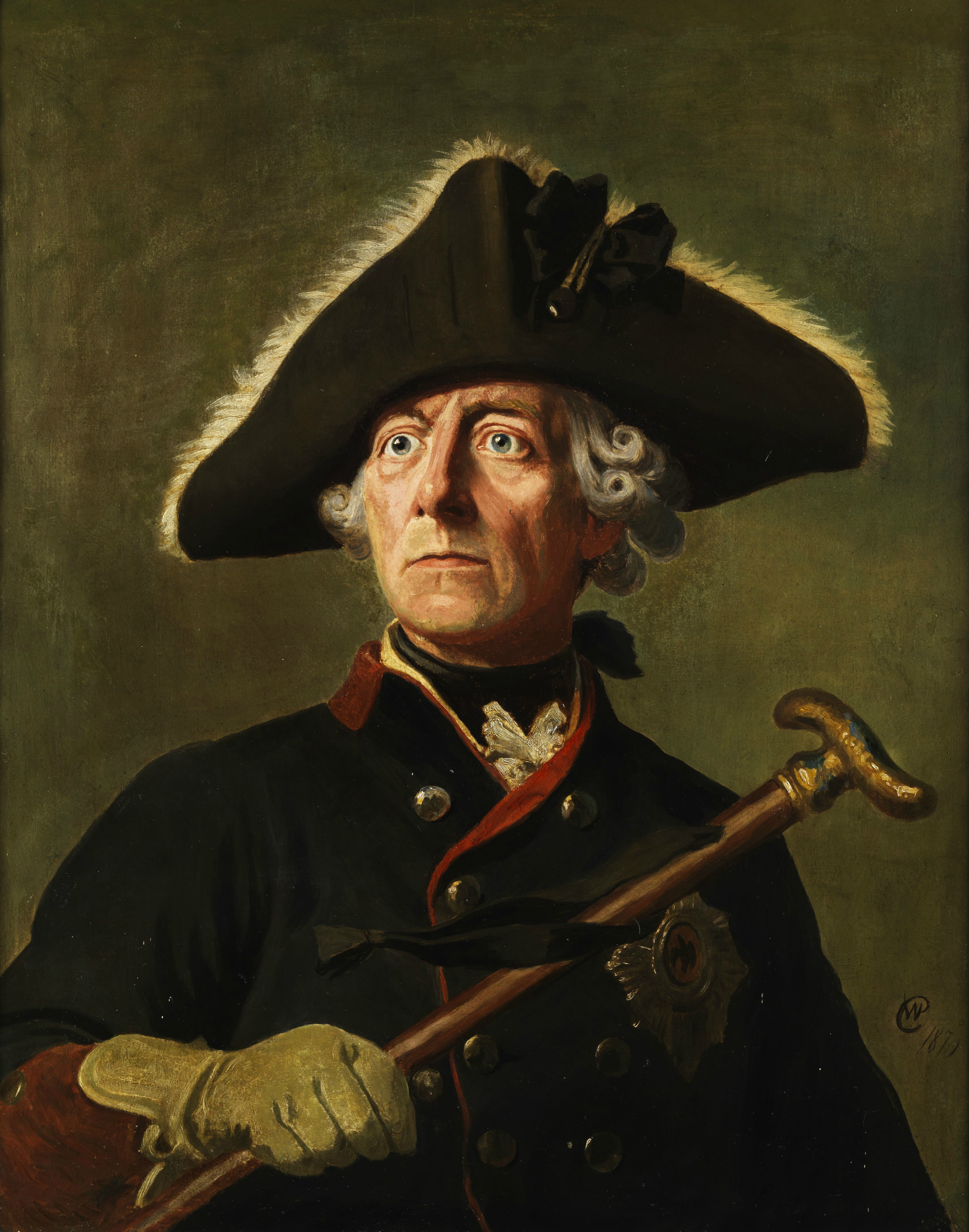
Frederick the Great, painting by Wilhelm Camphausen

=== Third Silesian War ===
Austria allied with its traditional rival, France, in the Diplomatic Revolution (1756); Austria, France, and Russia were all aligned against Prussia. Frederick preemptively attacked his enemies with an army of 150,000, beginning the Seven Years' War. The Austrian Army had been reformed by Kaunitz, and the improvements showed in their success over Prussia at Kolín. Frederick achieved one of his greatest victories, however, at Rossbach, where the Prussian cavalry of Friedrich Wilhelm von Seydlitz smashed a larger Franco-Imperial army with minimal casualties, despite being outnumbered two to one. Frederick then rushed eastward to Silesia, where Austria had defeated the Prussian army under the Duke of Bevern. After a series of complicated formations and deployments hidden from the Austrians, the Prussians successfully struck their enemy's flank at Leuthen, with Friedrich once again directing the battle; the Austrian position in the province collapsed, resulting in a Prussian victory even more impressive than the one at Rossbach.

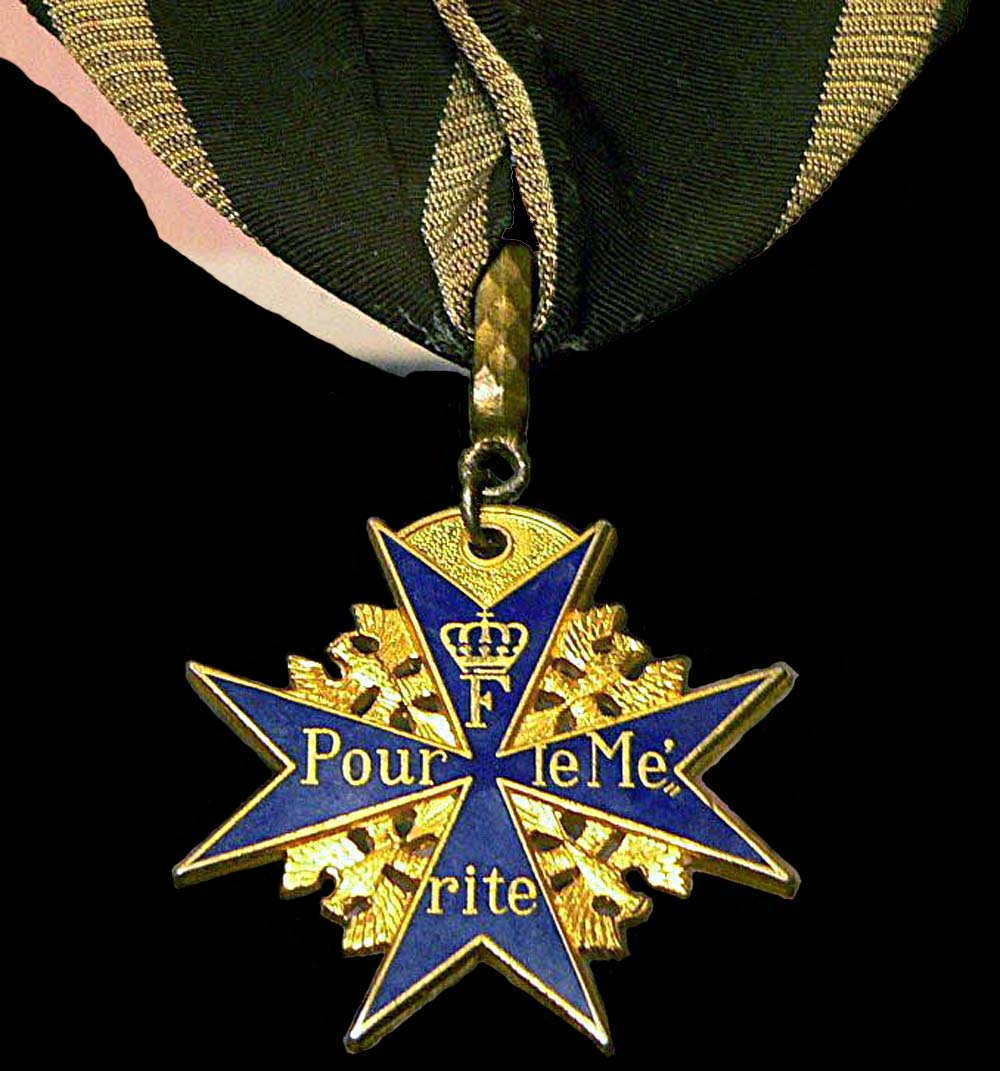
The Pour le Mérite, introduced by King Frederick the Great in 1740

Frederick's maneuvers were unsuccessful against the Russians in the bloody Battle of Zorndorf, however, and Prussian forces were crushed at Kunersdorf (1759). Like the results after the Battle of Hochkirch, though, in which the Prussians had to withdraw, the Austrian and Russian Allies did not follow up on their victory. Within the week, the Russian force began a withdrawal eastward; Austrians retreated southward.

Prussia was ill-suited for lengthy wars, and a Prussian collapse seemed imminent on account of casualties and lack of resources, but after two more years of campaigning, Frederick was saved by the "Miracle of the House of Brandenburg" — the Russian exit from the war after the sudden death of Empress Elizabeth in 1762. Prussian control of Silesia was confirmed in the Treaty of Hubertusburg (1763). Severe casualties had led the king to admit middle class officers during the war, but this trend was reversed afterwards.

The offensive-minded Frederick advocated the oblique order of battle, which required considerable discipline and mobility. This tactic failed at Kunersdorf primarily because of the terrain, which could not be used to an advantage. The Russians had arrived early and fortified themselves on the high ground. Frederick used oblique order to great success at Hohenfriedberg and later Leuthen. After a few initial volley fire, the infantry was to advance quickly for a bayonet charge. The Prussian cavalry was to attack as a large formation with swords before the opposing cavalry could attack.

=== An army with a country ===
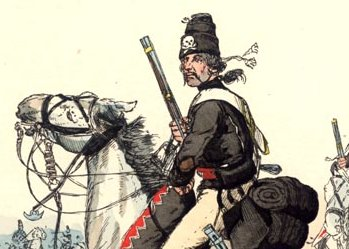
Death's Head hussar, print by Richard Knötel

The first garrison began construction in Berlin in 1764. While Frederick William I wanted to have a mostly native-born army, Frederick II wanted to have a mostly foreign-born army, preferring to have native Prussians be taxpayers and producers. The Prussian Army consisted of 187,000 soldiers in 1776, 90,000 of whom were Prussian subjects in central and eastern Prussia. The remainder were foreign (both German and non-German) volunteers or conscripts. Frederick established the Gardes du Corps as the royal guard. Many troops were disloyal, such as mercenaries or those acquired through impressment, while troops recruited from the canton system displayed strong regional, and nascent national pride. During the Seven Years' War, the elite regiments of the army were almost entirely composed of native Prussians. By the end of Frederick's reign, the army had become an integral part of Prussian society. It numbered 200,000 soldiers, making it the third-largest in Europe after the armies of Russia and Austria. The social classes were all expected to serve the state and its military — the nobility led the army, the middle class supplied the army, and the peasants composed the army. Minister Friedrich von Schrötter, along with others, is claimed to have remarked that, "Prussia was not a country with an army, but an army with a country".

== The Napoleonic Wars ==
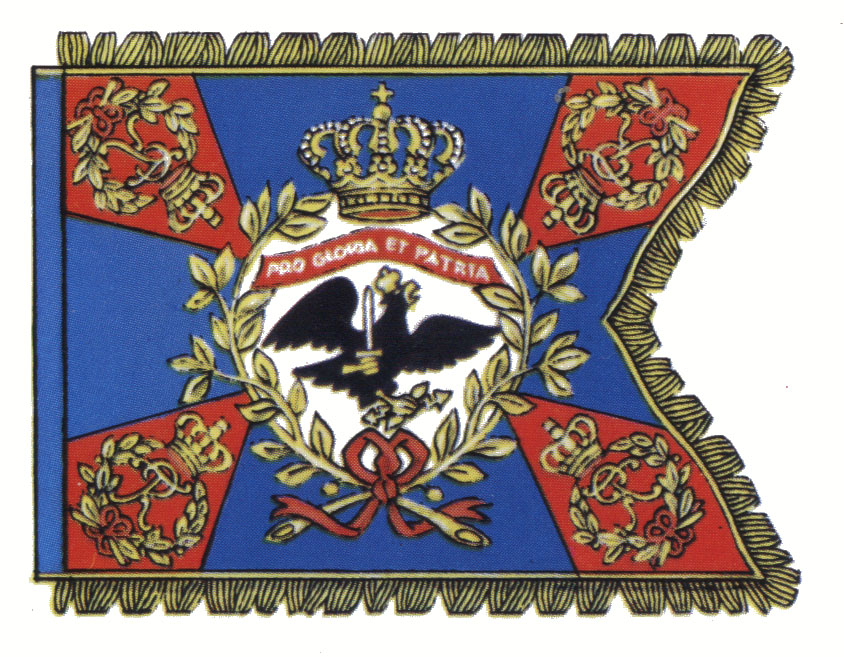
A standard of the Prussian Army used before 1807

=== Defeat ===
Frederick the Great's successor, his nephew Frederick William II (1786–97), relaxed conditions in Prussia and had little interest in war. He delegated responsibility to the aged Charles William Ferdinand, Duke of Brunswick, and the army began to degrade in quality. Led by veterans of the Silesian Wars, the Prussian Army was ill-equipped to deal with Revolutionary France. The officers retained the same training, tactics and weaponry used by Frederick the Great some forty years earlier. In comparison, the French Revolutionary Army, especially under Napoleon, was developing new methods of organization, supply, mobility, and command.

Prussia withdrew from the First Coalition in the Peace of Basel (1795), ceding the Rhenish territories to France. Upon Frederick William II's death in 1797, the state was bankrupt and the army outdated. He was succeeded by his son, Frederick William III (1797–1840), who involved Prussia in the disastrous Fourth Coalition. The Prussian Army was decisively defeated in the battles of Saalfeld, Jena and Auerstedt in 1806 and Napoleon occupied Berlin. The Prussians' famed discipline collapsed and led to widescale surrendering among infantry, cavalry and garrisons. While some Prussian commanders acquitted themselves well, such as L'Estocq at Eylau, Gneisenau at Kolberg, and Blücher at Lübeck, they were not enough to reverse the defeats of Jena-Auerstedt. Prussia submitted to major territorial losses, a standing army of only 42,000 men, and an alliance with France in the Treaty of Tilsit (1807).

=== Reform ===
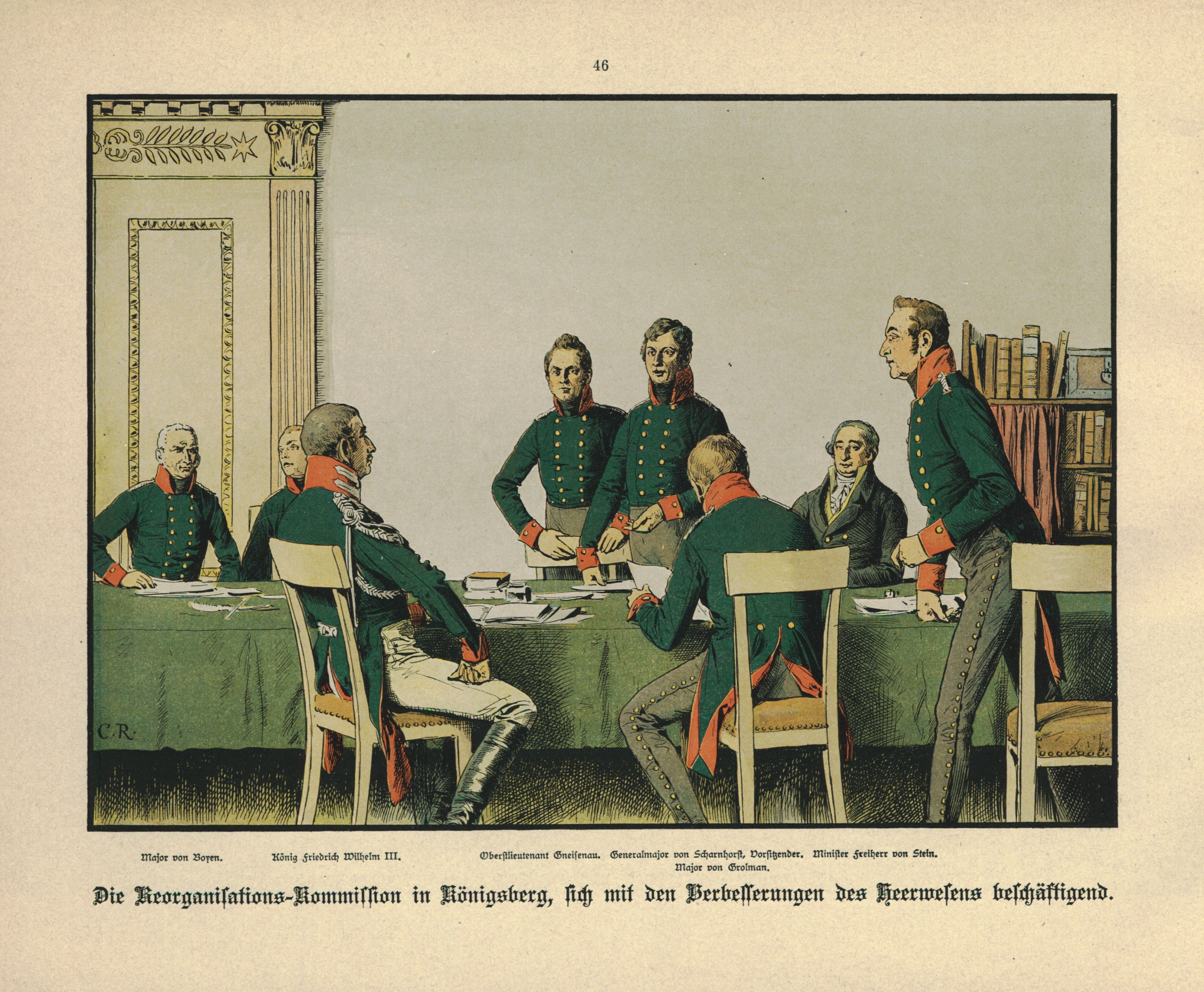
Meeting of the reformers in Königsberg in 1807, by Carl Röchling

The defeat of the disorganized army shocked the Prussian establishment, which had largely felt invincible after the Frederician victories. While Baron vom Stein and Prime Minister Karl August von Hardenberg began modernizing the Prussian state, General Gerhard von Scharnhorst began to reform the military. He led a Military Reorganization Committee, which included Generals August von Gneisenau, Karl von Grolman, and Hermann von Boyen as well as the civilian vom Steinen. Prussian military officer, Carl von Clausewitz assisted with the reorganization as well. Dismayed by the populace's indifferent reaction to the 1806 defeats, the reformers wanted to cultivate patriotism within the country. Stein's reforms abolished serfdom in 1807 and initiated local city government in 1808.

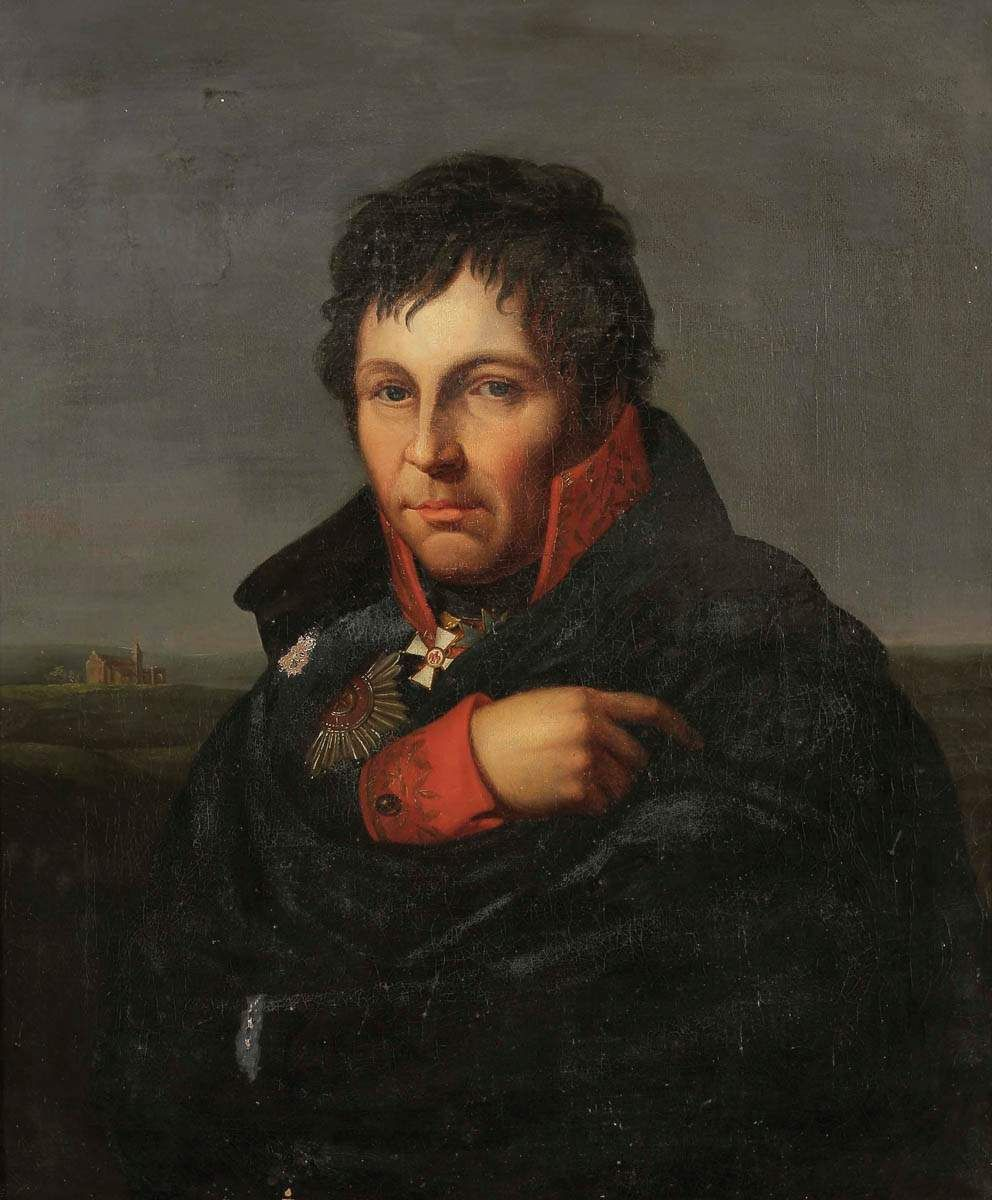
Gerhard von Scharnhorst

The generals of the army were completely overhauled – of the 143 Prussian generals in 1806, only Blücher and Tauentzien remained by the Sixth Coalition; many were allowed to redeem their reputations in the war of 1813. The officer corps was reopened to the middle class in 1808, while advancement into the higher ranks became based on education. King Frederick William III created the War Ministry in 1809, and Scharnhorst founded an officers training school, the later Prussian War Academy, in Berlin in 1810.

Scharnhorst advocated adopting the levée en masse, the universal military conscription used by France. He created the Krümpersystem, by which companies replaced 3–5 men monthly, allowing up to 60 extra men to be trained annually per company. This system granted the army a larger reserve of 30,000–150,000 extra troops. The Krümpersystem was also the beginning of short-term (3 years') compulsory service in Prussia, as opposed to the long-term (5 to 10 years') conscription previously used since the 1650s. Because the occupying French prohibited the Prussians from forming divisions, the Prussian Army was divided into six brigades, each consisting of seven to eight infantry battalions and twelve squadrons of cavalry. The combined brigades were supplemented with three brigades of artillery.

Corporal punishment was by and large abolished, while soldiers were trained in the field and in tirailleur tactics. Scharnhorst promoted the integration of the infantry, cavalry, artillery, and engineers (sappers) through combined arms, as opposed to their previous independent states. Equipment and tactics were updated in respect to the Napoleonic campaigns. The field manual issued by Yorck in 1812 emphasized combined arms and faster marching speeds. In 1813, Scharnhorst succeeded in attaching a chief of staff trained at the academy to each field commander.

Some reforms were opposed by Frederician traditionalists, such as Yorck, who felt that middle class officers would erode the privileges of the aristocratic officer corps and promote the ideas of the French Revolution. The army reform movement was cut short by Scharnhorst's death in 1813. The shift to a more democratic and middle-class military began to lose momentum in the face of the reactionary government.

=== Wars of the Sixth And Seventh Coalition ===
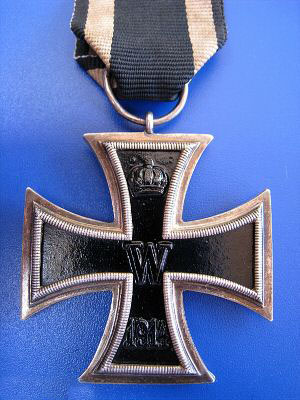
The Iron Cross, introduced by King Frederick William III in 1813

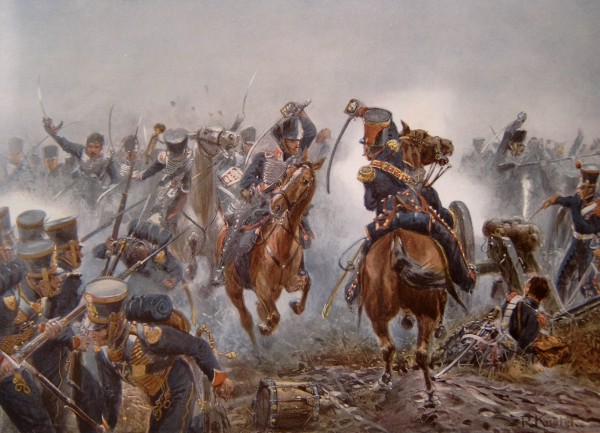
Prussian hussars at the Battle of Leipzig, 1813

The reformers and much of the public called for Frederick William III to ally with the Austrian Empire in its 1809 campaign against France. When the cautious king refused to support a new Prussian war, however, Schill led his hussar regiment against the occupying French, expecting to provoke a national uprising. The king considered Schill a mutineer, and the major's rebellion was crushed at Stralsund by French allies. The Treaty of Paris (24 February 1812) forced Prussia to provide 20,000 troops to Napoleon's Grande Armée, first under the leadership of Grawert and then under Yorck. The French occupation of Prussia was reaffirmed, and 300 demoralized Prussian officers resigned in protest.

During Napoleon's retreat from Russia in 1812, Yorck independently signed the Convention of Tauroggen with Russia, breaking the Franco-Prussian alliance. Stein arrived in East Prussia and led the raising of a Landwehr, or militia to defend the province. With Prussia's joining of the Sixth Coalition out of his hands, Frederick William III quickly began to mobilize the army, and the East Prussian Landwehr was duplicated in the rest of the country. In comparison to 1806, the Prussian populace, especially the middle class, was supportive of the war, and thousands of volunteers joined the army. Prussian troops under the leadership of Blücher and Gneisenau proved vital at the Battles of Leipzig (1813) and Waterloo (1815). Later staff officers were impressed with the simultaneous operations of separate groups of the Prussian Army.

The Iron Cross was introduced as a military decoration by King Frederick William III in 1813. After the publication of his book On War, Clausewitz became a widely studied philosopher of war.

== 19th century ==
=== Bulwark of conservatism ===
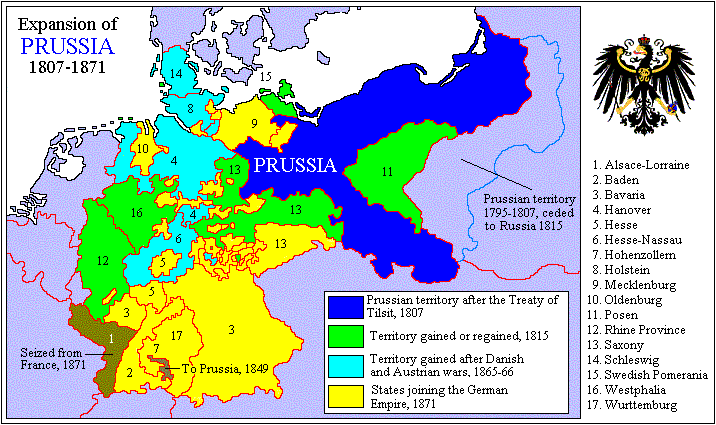
Expansion of Prussia, 1807–1871

The Prussian General Staff, which developed out of meetings of the Great Elector with his senior officers and the informal meeting of the Napoleonic Era reformers, was formally created in 1814. In the same year Boyen and Grolman drafted a law for universal conscription, by which men would successively serve in the standing army, the Landwehr and the local Landsturm until the age of 39. Troops of the 156,000-strong standing army served for three years and were in the reserves for two, while militiamen of the 163,000-strong Landwehr served a few weeks annually for seven years. Boyen and Blücher strongly supported the civilian army of the Landwehr, which was to unite military and civilian society, as an equal to the standing army.

During a constitutional crisis in 1819, Frederick William III recognized Prussia's adherence to the anti-revolutionary Carlsbad Decrees. Conservative forces within Prussia, such as Wittgenstein, remained opposed to conscription and the more democratic Landwehr. Frederick William III reduced the militia's size and placed it under the control of the regular army in 1819, leading to the resignations of Boyen and Grolman and the ending of the reform movement. Boyen's ideal of an enlightened citizen soldier was replaced with the idea of a professional military separate or alienated from civilian society.

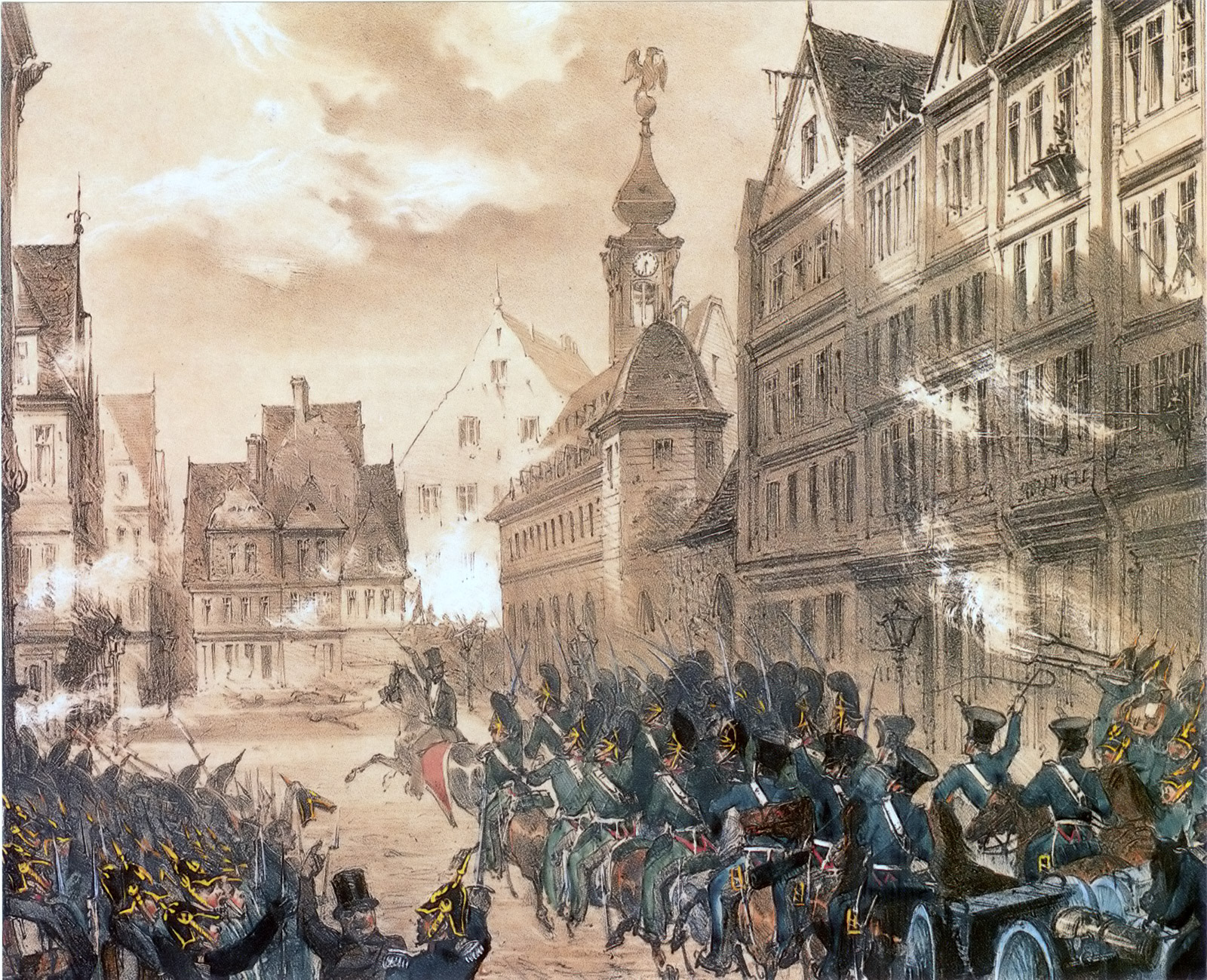
The storming of the Frankfurt barricades by Prussian-supported Hessian troops in 1848

By the middle of the 19th century, Prussia was seen by many German liberals as the country best-suited to unify the many German states, but the conservative government used the army to repress liberal and democratic tendencies during the 1830s and 1840s. Liberals resented the usage of the army in essentially police actions. King Frederick William IV (1840–61) initially appeared to be a liberal ruler, but he was opposed to issuing the written constitution called for by reformers. When barricades were raised in Berlin during the 1848 revolution, the king reluctantly agreed to the creation of a civilian defense force (Bürgerwehr) in his capital. A national assembly to write a constitution was convened for the first time, but its slowness allowed the reactionary forces to regroup. General Friedrich Graf von Wrangel led the reconquest of Berlin, which was supported by a middle class weary of a people's revolution. Prussian troops were subsequently used to suppress the revolution in many other German cities.

At the end of 1848, Frederick William finally issued the Constitution of the Kingdom of Prussia. The liberal opposition secured the creation of a parliament, but the constitution was largely a conservative document reaffirming the monarchy's predominance. The army was a praetorian guard outside of the constitution, subject only to the king. The Prussian Minister of War was the only soldier required to swear an oath defending the constitution, leading ministers such as Strotha, Bonin and Waldersee to be criticized by either the king or the parliament, depending on their political views. The army's budget had to be approved by the Prussian House of Representatives. Novels and memoirs glorifying the army, especially its involvement in the Napoleonic Wars, began to be published to sway public opinion. The defeat at Olmütz of the liberals' plan to unite Germany through Prussia encouraged reactionary forces. In 1856 during peacetime Prussian Army consisted of 86,436 infantrymen, 152 cavalry squadrons and 9 artillery regiments.

After Frederick William IV suffered a stroke, his brother William I became regent (1858) and king (1861–88). He desired to reform the army, which conservatives such as Roon considered to have degraded since 1820 because of liberalism. The king wanted to expand the army—while the populace had risen from 10 million to 18 million since 1820, the annual army recruits had remained 40,000. Although Bonin opposed Roon's desired weakening of the Landwehr, William I was alarmed by the nationalistic Second Italian War of Independence. Bonin resigned as Minister of War and was replaced with Roon.

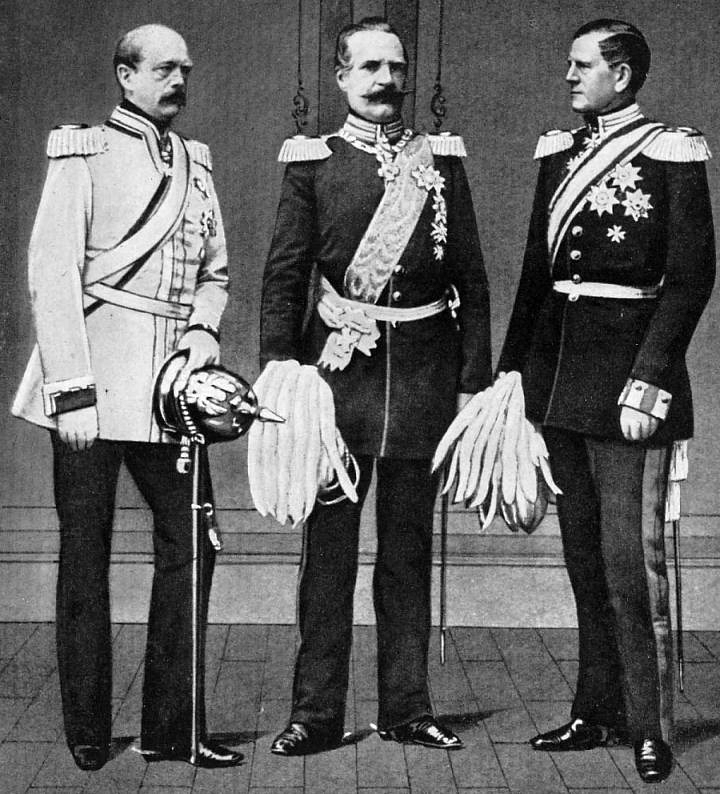
Bismarck, Roon and Moltke in the 1860s

The government submitted Roon's army reform bill in February 1860. The Landtag opposed many of its provisions, especially the weakening of the Landwehr, and proposed a revised bill that did away with many of the government's desired reforms. The Finance Minister, Patow, abruptly withdrew the bill on 5 May and instead simply requested a provisional budgetary increase of 9 million thalers, which was granted. William had already begun creating 'combined regiments' to replace the Landwehr, a process which increased after Patow acquired the additional funds. Although the Landtag was opposed to these actions, William maintained the new regiments with the guidance of Manteuffel. The liberal and middle-class Landwehr was thus subordinated in favor of the regular army, which was composed mostly of peasantry loyal to the Hohenzollern monarchy and conservative Junkers.

=== Moltke the Elder ===
Moltke the Elder, Chief of the General Staff from 1857–88, modernized the Prussian Army during his tenure. He expanded the General Staff, creating peacetime subdivisions such as the Mobilization, Geographical-Statistical and Military History Sections. In 1869, he issued a handbook for warfare on the operational level, Instructions for Large Unit Commanders, writing, "The modern conduct of war is marked by the striving for a great and rapid decision". Moltke was a strong proponent of war game training for officers and introduced the breech-loading needle gun to troops, which allowed them to fire significantly faster than their adversaries. Moltke took advantage of the railroad, guiding the construction of rail lines within Prussia to likely places of deployment. Because modern armies had become too large and unwieldy for a single commander to control, Moltke supported multiple and independent smaller armies in concentric operations. Once one army encountered the enemy and pinned it down, a second army would arrive and attack the enemy's flank or rear. He advocated a Kesselschlacht, or battle of encirclement.

Moltke's Instructions for Large Unit Commanders and his concept of separated armies saw the emergence of modern German doctrine. The system of moving units separately and concentrating as an army before a battle resulted in more efficient supply and lower vulnerability to modern firepower. To enable a successful flanking attack, he asserted that concentration could only take place after the commencement of a battle. This was a development of the Scharnhorst concept of "March Divided, Fight United."

A major consequence of this innovation was the commander's loss of overall control of his forces due to his available means of communication which, at that time, were visual (line-of-sight) or couriers, either mounted or on foot. The traditional concept of the elimination of uncertainty by means of "total obedience" was now obsolete and operational initiative, direction and control had to be assigned to a point further down the chain of command. In this new concept, commanders of distant detachments were required to exercise initiative in their decision making and von Moltke emphasized the benefits of developing officers who could do this within the limits of the senior commander’s intention.

At the same time Moltke had worked out the conditions of the march and supply of an army. Only one army corps could be moved along one road in the same day; to put two or three corps on the same road meant that the rear corps could not be made use of in a battle at the front. Several corps stationed close together in a small area could not be fed for more than a day or two. Accordingly, he inferred that the essence of strategy lay in arrangements for the separation of the corps for marching and their concentration in time for battle. In order to make a large army manageable, it must be broken up into separate armies or groups of corps, each group under a commander authorized to regulate its movements and action subject to the instructions of the commander-in-chief as regards the direction and purpose of its operations.

Moltke's main thesis was that military strategy had to be understood as a system of options since only the beginning of a military operation was plannable. As a result, he considered the main task of military leaders to consist in the extensive preparation of all possible outcomes. His thesis can be summed up by two statements, one famous and one less so, translated into English as No plan of operations extends with certainty beyond the first encounter with the enemy's main strength (no plan survives contact with the enemy). and Strategy is a system of expedients.

However, as can be seen from the descriptions of his planning for the war with Austria and the war with France, his planning for war was very detailed and took into account thousands of variables. It is a mistake to think that Moltke thought war plans were of no use (which a simple reading of "No battle plan survives contact with the enemy" would seem to indicate). He accomplished this by means of directives stating his intentions, rather than detailed orders, and he was willing to accept deviations from a directive provided that it was within the general framework of the mission. Moltke held this view firmly and it later became a fundamental of all German military theory.

=== Wars of unification ===
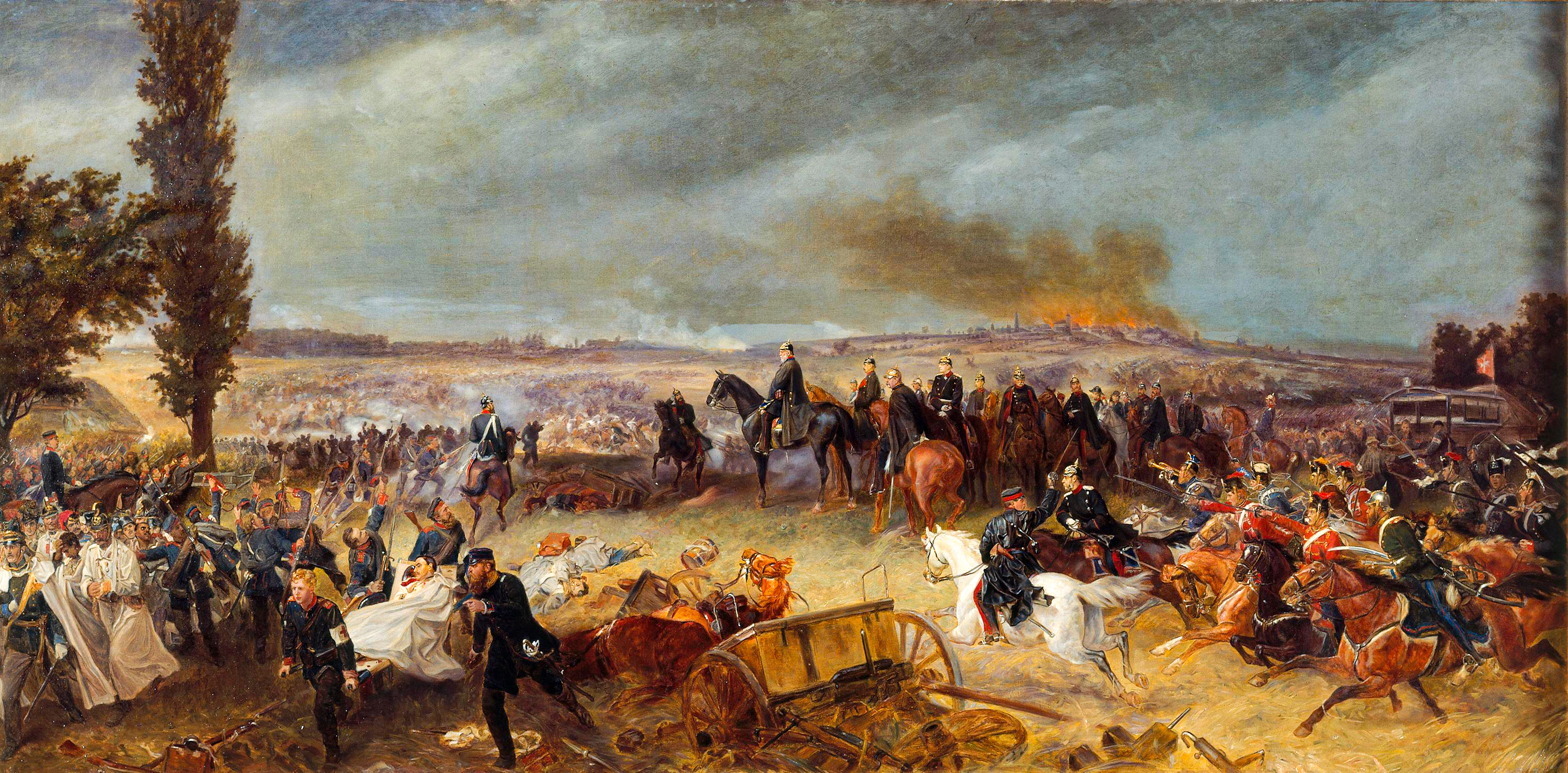
The battle of Königgrätz, 3 July 1866, by Georg Bleibtreu

The Prussian Army crushed Danish forces in the Battle of Dybbøl during the Second Schleswig War (1864), allowing Prussia and Austria to claim Schleswig and Holstein, respectively. Disputes orchestrated by the Prussian Minister President, Otto von Bismarck, led to the Austro-Prussian War (1866). The Dreyse needle guns of the Prussian infantry were highly successful against the Austrians, who were defeated at Königgrätz. Under the leadership of Moltke, the Prussian Army then proved victorious over France in the Franco-Prussian War (1870). Unlike the Austrians, the French had the powerful Chassepot rifle, which outclassed the Dreyse needle gun. However, the Prussian artillery was effective against the French, who were frequently flanked or surrounded by the mobile Prussians. Patriotism in Prussia from the victories began to undermine liberal resistance to absolutism.

The battlefield successes of Prussia allowed the unification of Germany, in 1871 and the proclamation of King William I of Prussia as William I, German Emperor. The Prussian Army formed the main component of the Reichsheer, the army of the German Empire.

== Imperial Germany ==
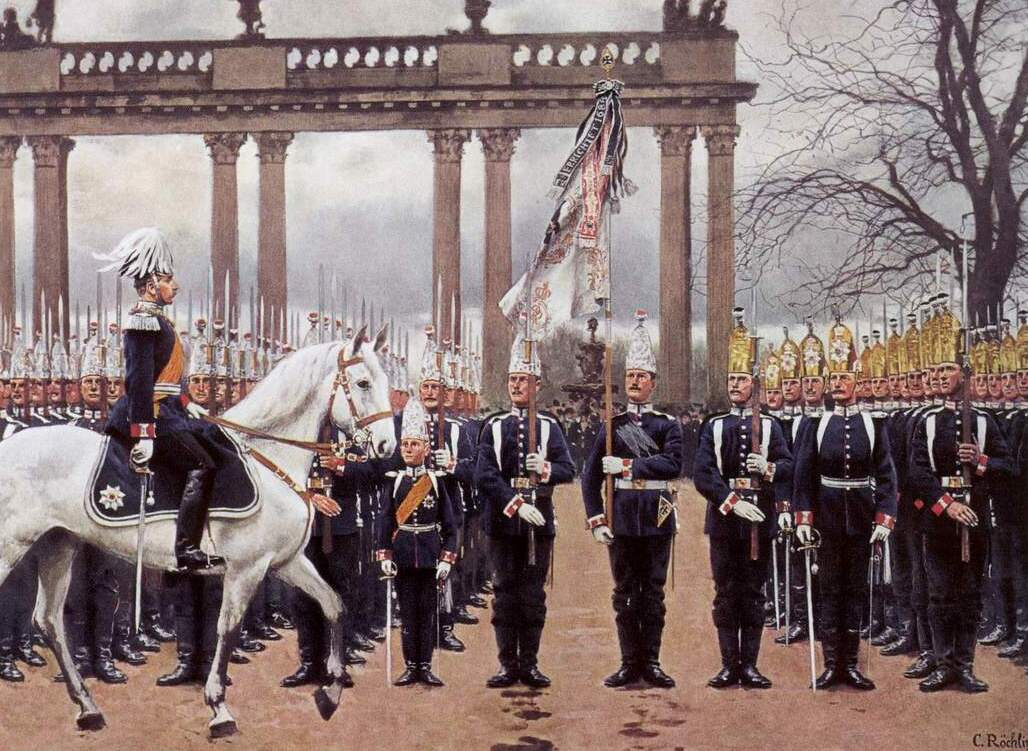
Kaiser Wilhelm II reviewing Prussian troops (Potsdam Giants), by Carl Röchling

The Imperial German Army inherited much of the traditions and concepts of the Prussian Army, which was its largest component army. According to article 61 of the Imperial constitution, the Prussian military code was to be introduced throughout the German Reich. The Bavarian, Saxon, and Württemberg kingdoms continued to retain their own armies, which came under Imperial control in wartime. The conservative leaders of the army took an ever-increasing role in both domestic and foreign policies.

By the end of the 19th century, most Prussian officers could be divided into two groups: those who argued for boldness and self-sacrifice, and those who advocated technology and maneuver in order to minimize casualties. First encountered during the Franco-Prussian War, new technological military innovations such as the machine gun increased the power of defensive units. For the Prussians, who advocated offensive operations, infantry attacks would risk becoming sacrificial assaults.

With regard to a possible future two-front war, Alfred von Schlieffen, the Chief of the General Staff from 1891–1906, had suggested a deployment scheme that became known as the Schlieffen Plan. Modified by Moltke the Younger, its intention of quickly defeating France proved impossible to achieve. In the actual event of the First World War, on the Western Front the German advance stalled into trench warfare after the First Battle of the Marne. On the Eastern Front, however, the Prussian operations succeeded in encircling and smashing the Russians at Tannenberg. Though developing infiltration tactics as a way of re-introducing maneuver to modern warfare, they were unable to achieve a decisive breakthrough in their German spring offensive on the Western Front in the last year of the war, and the Germans lost the war of attrition.

The Imperial German Army was replaced after World War I with the volunteer Reichswehr of the Weimar Republic. Although the Treaty of Versailles attempted to disarm Germany, the Reichswehr discreetly maintained many of the traditions of the Prussian Army. The General Staff was camouflaged as a non-descript Truppenamt (troop office), while the War Academy was replaced with decentralized divisional schools. Hans von Seeckt, the head of the Reichswehr, designated the new military's battalions as successors of the traditions of Prussian regiments.

During the interwar era, German officers contemplated how to apply maneuver warfare after the experiences of the Great War. Innovations in armor and airpower were adopted to infiltration tactics, resulting in the doctrine known as Blitzkrieg.

== Characteristics ==
From the 17th century, the army of Brandenburg-Prussia was characterized by its sense of initiative and aggressive command at both the tactical and operational level of war. The Hohenzollern state often had fewer resources and manpower than its rivals, and thus the Prussians focused on quickly achieving decisive battlefield victories to avoid wars of attrition/sieges. The Prussians practiced what became known as Bewegungskrieg, or war of movement, in an attempt to strike at the flanks or rear of the enemy. The Prussian emphasis on decisive battles instead of on wars of attrition led to inexperience in siege warfare, at which the Prussians have been considered sometimes incompetent compared to their skill in open warfare.

The Great Elector practiced many of the concepts applied to the Prussian Army in later centuries, including flank attacks at Warsaw and, at Fehrbellin, the willingness to attack when outnumbered. The elector advocated "short and lively" campaigns.

During the 1740s, Frederick the Great issued a series of new regulations and documents regarding his army's experiences during the first two Silesian wars and how they would relate to future wars. The doctrines he espoused focused on speed and offense. Lighter and faster cavalry were preferred over heavy cavalry; while Frederick William I had treated hussars as luxury troops, his son made them an integral part of the army. The artillery was to use light three-pound guns which made up for their lack of power with versatility. After being outmaneuvered by the Austrians in the Second Silesian War, Frederick began emphasizing an overwhelming attack instead of a war of attrition. Rather than frontal attacks, the Prussian king tried to apply the oblique order, by which his army's strongest wing focused against the enemy's weakest wing or flank, while restraining his own weaker wing. Frederick the Great summed up the Prussian style of war at Leuthen, advocating an attack on the enemy "even if he should be on top of the Zobtenberg".

The Prussian emphasis on attack was well-ingrained in its officer corps. In 1866 Flies unsuccessfully went on the offensive in the Battle of Langensalza, despite being outnumbered by the Hanoverians and having Falckenstein's troops nearby. Similarly, in 1870 Kirchbach was willing to endure excessive casualties at Wörth without waiting for reinforcements. Moltke wanted a quick campaign in Bohemia against Austria so that Russia or France would not become involved in the Austro-Prussian war. Although Moltke considered Prince Frederick Charles' march through Bohemia to be too slow, Hans Delbrück found the "Red Prince's" eventual attack at Königgrätz to have been in the Prussian tradition, "which, by daring to lose a battle, wins it".

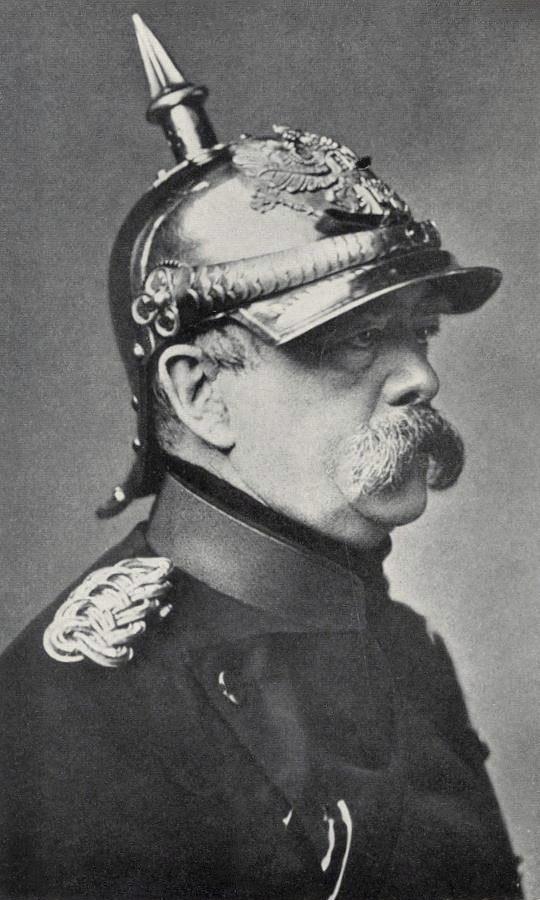
Otto von Bismarck, a civilian, wearing a cuirassier officer's metal Pickelhaube

The Prussian-style war of movement and quick strikes was well-suited for campaigns using the developed infrastructure of Western and Central Europe, such as in the wars of unification, but failed when the German Army applied it to the Soviet Union or in North Africa. The Prussian (and later, German) systems were regarded as weak in intelligence, counterintelligence, and logistics, but during the First World War the German Army was often able to lay its hands on British and French battle plans. If the enemy successfully endured the initial operational attacks, the Prussian system had great difficulty in Stellungskrieg, or war of position, though during the First World War such initial attacks were not as pronounced.

The Prussian Army is often considered to have used the flexible command of Auftragstaktik (mission tactics), by which subordinate officers led using personal initiative. This developed out of the relationship between the Junker aristocracy (who made up most of the officer corps) and the monarchy. In return for political support from the nobles, the monarchs granted them greater privileges on their estates and greater initiative on the battlefield. According to the theory of Auftragstaktik, the commander would issue a mission to his subordinate officers, who were to pursue the directive as they saw fit. Gneisenau was an early proponent of Auftragstaktik, and Moltke interpreted the theory as "the higher the authority, the shorter and more general" the orders; considerable leeway was granted to subordinates in order to pursue the goal. 19th-century historians saw Leuthen as one of the best examples of Auftragstaktik and an early example of combined arms.

The Prussian Army acquired a reputation for strict and savage military discipline.

Often stereotypically associated with the Prussian Army was the Pickelhaube, or spiked helmet, in use in the 19th and early-20th centuries. Victorious battles were celebrated with military marches, such as the Hohenfriedberger Marsch, allegedly written by Frederick the Great after Hohenfriedberg, and the Königgrätzer Marsch, by the march-composer Piefke. The Prussian Großer Zapfenstreich military tattoo is still in use by the modern Bundeswehr. The Iron Cross, adopted by the German Empire and its successor states, is also still used as a symbol of the Bundeswehr.

== See also ==
- Erzieher des Preußischen Heeres
- Prussian Navy
- Bavarian Army
- Royal Saxon Army
- Army of Württemberg
- Hanoverian Army
- Brandenburg Navy
- German General Staff
- Prussian virtues

== Bibliography ==
- Bartov, Omer (1992). The Perversion of Discipline Hitler's Army: Soldiers, Nazis, and War in the Third Reich. New York: Oxford University Press. ISBN 9780195313512.
- Blackbourn, David (2003). History of Germany, 1780–1918: The Long Nineteenth Century. Blackwell Publishing. p. 544. ISBN 0-631-23196-X.
- Citino, Robert M. (2005). The German Way of War: From the Thirty Years' War to the Third Reich. University Press of Kansas. p. 428. ISBN 0-7006-1410-9.
- Citino, Robert M. (2007). The Path to Blitzkrieg: Doctrine and Training in the German Army, 1920–39. Stackpole Books. ISBN 978-0-8117-3457-8.
- Koch, H. W. (1978). A History of Prussia. New York: Barnes & Noble Books. ISBN 0-88029-158-3.
- Clark, Christopher (2006). Iron Kingdom: The Rise and Downfall of Prussia 1600–1947. Cambridge: Belknap Press of Harvard. pp. 776. ISBN 0-674-02385-4.
- Clemente, Steven E. (1992). For King and Kaiser!: The making of the Prussian Army officer, 1860–1914. New York: Greenwood. ISBN 0313280045.
- Corum, James S. (1992). The Roots of Blitzkrieg: Hans von Seeckt and German Military Reform. Lawrence: University Press of Kansas. ISBN 978-0-7006-0541-5.
- Craig, Gordon A. (1964). The Politics of the Prussian Army: 1640–1945. London: Oxford University Press. pp. 538. ISBN 0-19-500257-1.
- Fulbrook, Mary (1983). Piety and Politics: Religion and the Rise of Absolutism in England, Wurttemberg and Prussia. Cambridge University Press. pp. 223. ISBN 0-521-27633-0.
- Gilbert, Adrian (2013). "Warfare in the 18th Century". Encyclopedia of Warfare: From the Earliest Times to the Present Day. London: Routledge. ISBN 9781135956905.
- Hoyer, Katja (2021). Blood and Iron: Rise and Fall of the German Empire. Cheltenham: Pegasus Books. ISBN 9780750996914.
- MacDonogh, Giles (2001). Frederick the Great: A Life in Deed and Letters. New York: St. Martin's Griffin. p. 436. ISBN 0-312-27266-9.
- Möbius, Katrin; Möbius, Sascha (2019). Prussian Army Soldiers and the Seven Years' War: The Psychology of Honour. London: Bloomsbury Publishing. ISBN 9781350081581.
- Moltke, Helmuth, Graf Von (1993). Hughes, Daniel J. (ed.). Moltke on the Art of War: Selected Writings. New York: Presidio Press. ISBN 0-89141-575-0.
- Nash, David (1972). The Prussian Army, 1808–1815. London: Almark Publishing. OCLC 72358109.
- Reiners, Ludwig (1960). Frederick the Great: A Biography. Translated by Lawrence P. R. Wilson. New York: G. P. Putnam & Sons. p. 304.
- Ritter, Gerhard (1974). Frederick the Great: A Historical Profile. Berkeley: University of California Press. pp. 207]. ISBN 0-520-02775-2.
- Showalter, Dennis E. (1994). "Hubertusburg to Auerstädt: The Prussian Army in Decline". German History. 12 (3): 308–333. doi:10.1093/gh/12.3.308.
- Summerfield, Stephen (2009). Line and Guard 1808–1814. Prussian Infantry 1808–1840. Vol. 1. Partizan Press. ISBN 978-1-85818-583-5.
- Summerfield, Stephen (2009). Jager, Reserve, Freikorps and New Regiments. russian Infantry 1808–1840. Vol. 2. Partizan Press. ISBN 978-1-85818-584-2.
- Trumpener, Ulrich (1979). "Junkers and Others: The Rise of Commoners in the Prussian Army, 1871–1914". Canadian Journal of History. 14 (1): 29–48. doi:10.3138/cjh.14.1.29.
- Wiggerich, Sandro; et al. (Studien zur Geschichte des Alltags) (2011). "Der Körper als Uniform. Die Normierung der soldatischen Haartracht in Preußen und in der Bundesrepublik". In Sandro Wiggerich, Steven Kensy (ed.). Staat Macht Uniform. Uniformen als Zeichen staatlicher Macht im Wandel?. Vol. 29. Stuttgart: Franz Steiner Verlag. ISBN 978-3-515-09933-2.
- White, Jonathan Randall (1996). The Prussian Army, 1640–1871. Lanham: University Press of America. ISBN 0761802053.
- Zabecki, David T (2015). N-T. Germany at War: 400 Years of Military History. Vol. 3. Santa Barbara: ABC-CLIO. OCLC 938894415.
