= Walter von Bremen =

German officer and military writer

Walter von Bremen (born 1852 in Bergen auf Rügen; date of death unknown) was a German officer (retiring as a Prussian lieutenant colonel) and military writer. He authored a wide range of military-historical and contemporary works, many of which were widely circulated during the German Empire and the First World War.

== Life ==
Walter von Bremen was born in 1852 in Bergen auf Rügen. From 1889 to 1891 he served as a lecturer in military history at the Prussian Kriegsakademie in Berlin, after which he was assigned to the "Kriegsgeschichtliche Abteilung II" (KA II, War History Section II). In 1897 he retired from active duty, but between 1899 and 1910 he remained attached to the KA II, where he last held the rank of lieutenant colonel.

In 1909 he was listed in the Handbuch für Heer und Flotte as a Prussian lieutenant colonel à la suite, assigned to the Great General Staff in Berlin. The year of his death is unknown.

== Work ==
Von Bremen authored a large number of military-historical writings, including works on Napoleon, Friedrich der Große and Yorck von Wartenburg, as well as popular writings on the First World War. His focus lay on presenting military history to a wider audience.

He was particularly noted for his study on the colonial armies of the European great powers and for his biographies of contemporary field marshals such as Hindenburg and Mackensen.

== Selected publications ==
- Der vaterländische Hilfsdienst. Berlin: Kameradschaft, [1919].
- General-Feldmarschall von Hindenburg. Berlin: Kameradschaft, 1917.
- Generalfeldmarschall von Mackensen. Berlin: Kameradschaft, 1917.
- Antwerpen. Berlin: Kameradschaft, [1915].
- Das Eiserne Kreuz 1813–1870–1914. Berlin: Kameradschaft, 1915.
- Die Kriegsereignisse in West und Ost bis Dezember 1914. Berlin: Mittler, 1915.
- Unsere ersten Siege in West und Ost. Berlin: Kameradschaft, 1914.
- Das deutsche Heer nach der Neuordnung von 1913. Bielefeld: Velhagen & Klasing, [1913].
- Die Völkerschlacht bei Leipzig am 18. Oktober 1813. Berlin: Kameradschaft, 1913, 11th ed.
- Napoleon I. Bielefeld: Velhagen & Klasing, [1912].
- Yorck von Wartenburg. Bielefeld: Velhagen & Klasing, [1912?].
- Friedrich der Große. II: Der Siebenjährige Krieg. Bielefeld/Leipzig: Velhagen & Klasing, 1912.
- Die Kolonialtruppen und Kolonialarmeen der Hauptmächte Europas. Ihre geschichtliche Entwicklung und ihr gegenwärtiger Zustand. Bielefeld/Leipzig: Velhagen & Klasing, 1902.

As editor:

- Eduard von Fransecky: Denkwürdigkeiten des preußischen Generals der Infanterie Eduard von Fransecky. Bielefeld: Velhagen & Klasing, 1901 (also Berlin: Boll & Pickardt).

== Reception ==
Von Bremen was regarded as one of the prolific military writers of the German Empire, whose works served both the popularization of military history and wartime propaganda during the First World War. His books were often published in large print runs and included in popular historical series. For the series Erzieher des Preußischen Heeres he contributed the volume Friedrich der Große.

== Bibliography ==
- Handbuch für Heer und Flotte, vol. 2: Bayreuth - Dampfsammler. Georg Karl Friedrich Viktor von Alten (ed.). Deutsches Verlagshaus Bong & Co., 1909
- Martin Raschke: Der politisierende Generalstab: die friderizianischen Kriege in der amtlichen deutschen Militärgeschichtsschreibung 1890–1914. Edited by Militärgeschichtliches Forschungsamt, Rombach, Freiburg i. Br., 1993, p. 77.
