= Eduard von Bonin =

Prussian general officer and Minister of War

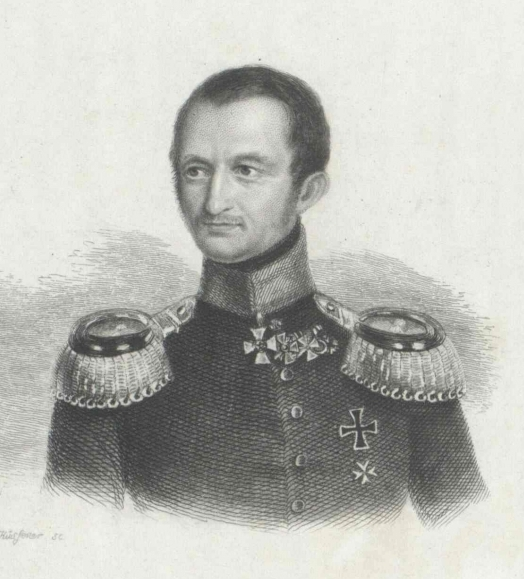
- Eduard von Bonin
- Born: 7 March 1793; Stolp, Farther Pomerania, Prussia
- Died: 13 March 1865 (aged 72); Koblenz, Prussia
- Military career
- Allegiance: Prussia; Schleswig-Holstein
- Branch: Prussian Army
- Service years: 1806–1859
- Rank: General
- Commands: 16th Infanteriebrigade; 16th Division; 12th Division; VIII Corps; Army of the united duchies of Schleswig and Holstein
- Conflicts: Napoleonic Wars; First Schleswig War
- Awards: Iron Cross

Eduard Wilhelm Ludwig von Bonin (7 March 1793 – 13 March 1865) was a Prussian general officer who served as Prussian Minister of War from 1852 to 1854 and 1858 to 1859. He fought in the Napoleonic and First Schleswig wars. In 1856, he became the Vice-Governor of Mainz.

== Life ==
Bonin, of the Bonin noble family of Pomerania and East Prussia, was born in Stolp in Farther Pomerania. In 1806, he entered the regiment of Frederick William, Duke of Brunswick-Wolfenbüttel. During the Fourth Coalition against Napoleon Bonaparte, he participated in Gebhard Leberecht von Blücher's retreat to Lübeck, where he was taken prisoner. Released after giving his word of honor, Bonin studied at the gymnasium in the garrison town of Prenzlau.

In August 1809, Bonin entered the 1st Garderegiment as a Fähnrich. Promoted to Leutnant in 1810, he was made an Adjutant of the Gardebrigade during the battles of 1813 and 1814. At Paris, he received the Iron Cross, 1st Class. Bonin was successively promoted to Hauptmann in 1817, Major of the Alexanderregiment in 1829, Oberst in 1842, and Commanding Officer of the 16th Infantry Brigade in 1848.

Bonin took command of the Prussian Brigade of the Line on 26 March 1848, during the First Schleswig War. He distinguished himself in battles at Schleswig and Düppel. After the Armistice of Malmö, Bonin was named commanding officer of the army of the united duchies of Schleswig and Holstein, which he reorganized and strengthened during the winter of 1848–49. He fought successfully at Kolding on 20 April and 23 April 1849, but was unable to capture Fredericia and his forces were thrown back on 6 July. After the second armistice between Prussia and Denmark, Bonin resigned his command of the Schleswig-Holstein army and returned to the Prussian Army in April 1850.

At first the commander of Berlin, Bonin became the commanding officer of the 16th Division in Trier. Bonin was promoted to Generalleutnant and named Minister of War in March 1852. He advocated greater tactical mobility for infantry, which he provided with improved weapons. Bonin presided over the merger of the Landwehr with front-line troops through the creation of mixed line and Landwehr brigades. He also tried to improve the organization of the Landwehr cavalry.

Opposed to the Russian influence on Prussian politics during the Crimean War, Bonin was dismissed in 1854 after high-ranking officers alleged that he had tried "to create a schism in the Prussian army" through anti-Russian comments.

He received command of 12 Division in Neisse in 1854. He then became Vice-Governor of Mainz on 20 March 1856. After the ministry of Otto von Manteuffel was dismissed on 6 November 1858, Bonin returned to the War Ministry upon the request of Prince-Regent William. Bonin thus joined a more liberal ministry opposed to the reactionary politics of the previous eight years. He was more favorable to constitutional politics than many high-ranking officers. As War Minister, Bonin insisted that "he be consulted on all military matters, that he be allowed to counter-sign all important military orders and that all royal communications to the commanding generals pass through his hands."

Albrecht von Roon wanted to merge the Landwehr militia into the professional line army; Bonin, a disciple of the Napoleonic reformer Hermann von Boyen, favored the Landwehr and thought that Roon's plan would "separate the army from the country". Rather than directly confronting Roon, Bonin tried to delay Roon's plan through procrastination and appeals to William. However, concerned about war in Italy, William wanted to expand and reform the body. Influenced by Bonin's rival, Edwin von Manteuffel, William hand-picked a special military commission led by Roon to draft a reform bill in September 1859. Furious that the Ministry of War was bypassed by William's actions, Bonin criticized the proposed reforms and pointed out the infeasibility of its budget. Realizing that William had lost patience with him, Bonin resigned in November. He was replaced as Minister of War a month later by Roon. Bonin was subsequently made commanding general of the VIII Armeekorps in Koblenz, where he later died.

== Works by Bonin ==
- Grundzüge für das zerstreute Gefecht. Verlag Mittler, Berlin 1839.

== Notes ==
Political offices
Preceded by August von Stockhausen	Prussian Minister of War; 1852–1854	Succeeded by Friedrich von Waldersee
Preceded by Friedrich von Waldersee	Prussian Minister of War; 1858–1859	Succeeded by Albrecht von Roon
