= Battle of Kolding (1849) =

Battle between Denmark and the German Confederation during the First Schleswig War

- Part of the First Schleswig War
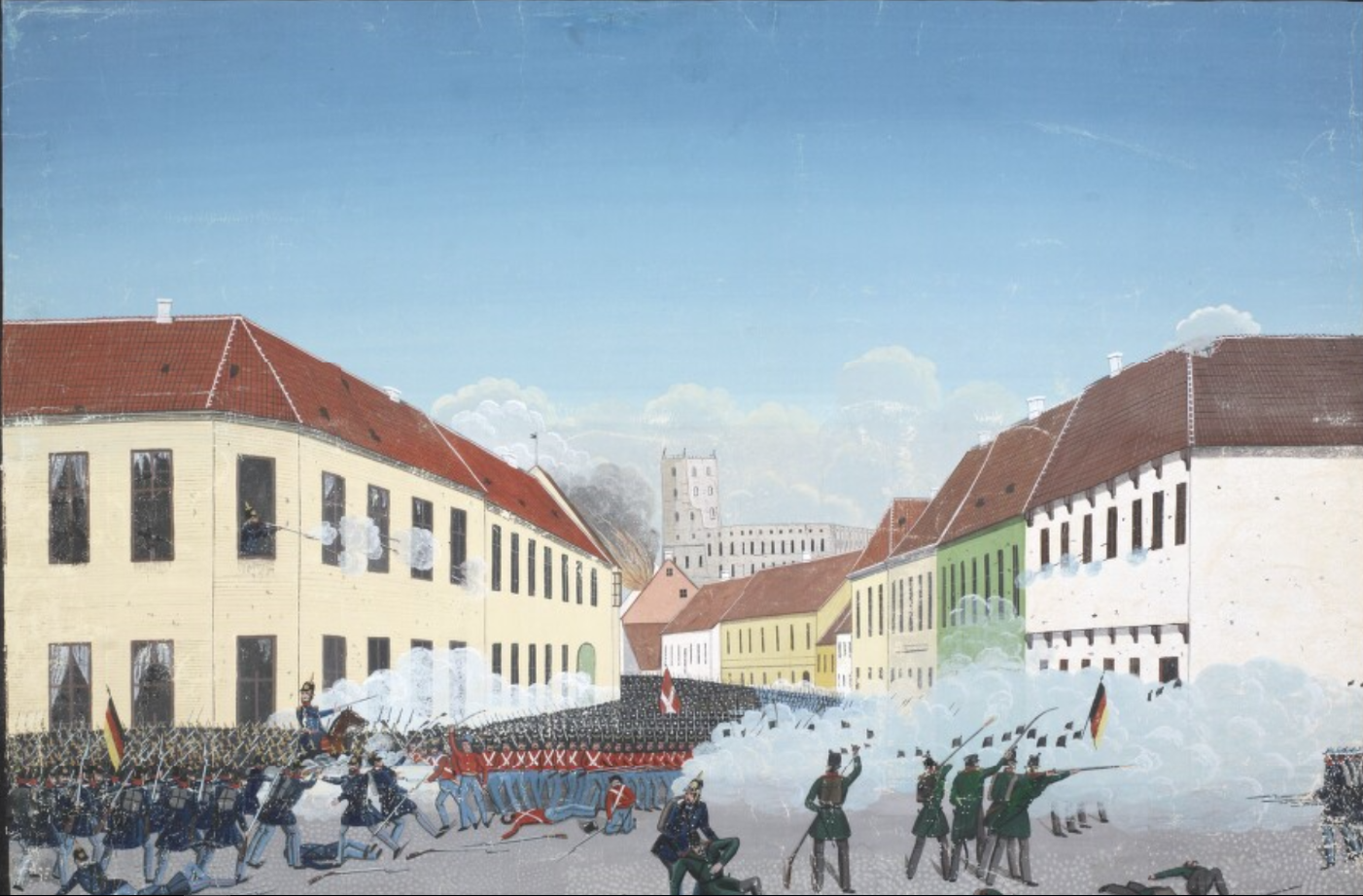
- Scene from the Battle of Kolding by Rasmus Henrik Kruse
Date	23 April 1849
Location	Kolding, Region of Southern Denmark
Result	Prussian victory

Belligerents
Prussia	Denmark

Commanders and leaders
(Kingdom of Prussia) Eduard von Bonin (Kingdom of Prussia) Friedrich von Beckedorff (Kingdom of Prussia) Eduard von Fransecky	(Denmark) Frederik Rubeck Bülow (Denmark) Olaf Rye (Denmark) C.F. Moltke

Strength
14,000; 40 guns	16,500; 32 guns

Casualties and losses
52 killed 265 wounded	145 killed 393 wounded

The Battle of Kolding was a battle during the First Schleswig War fought between a Prussian army under Eduard von Bonin and a Danish army under Frederik Rubeck Bülow in Kolding, Denmark on 23 April 1849. The Prussians were victorious and the Danish army was forced to retreat towards Vejle and Fredericia.

== Bibliography ==
- Kim Mikkelsen, Det glemte Slag – Kampene omkring Kolding 23. April 1849 1999 ISBN 87 87152 40 1 (opplag på bare 1000 stk.)
- Gerd Stolz: Die Schleswig-Holsteinische Erhebung. Husum Druck- und Verlagsgesellschaft. 1996, ISBN 3-88042-769-0. S. 126–131.
