= 16th Division (German Empire) =

16th Division (16. Division); in 1870-71 and from August 2, 1914, 16th Infantry Division (16. Infanterie-Division) — XX —
- Active: 1818–1919
- Country: Prussia/Germany
- Branch: Heer (Army)
- Type: Infantry (in peacetime included cavalry)
- Size: Approx. 15,000
- Part of: VIII. Army Corps (VIII. Armeekorps)
- Garrison/HQ: Trier
- Engagements: Austro-Prussian War: Königgrätz Franco-Prussian War: Spicheren, Mars-la-Tour, Gravelotte, Metz, Amiens, Hallue, St. Quentin World War I: Great Retreat, 1st Marne, Somme, Passchendaele, German spring offensive, Lys, 2nd Somme

Commanders
- Notable commanders: Eduard von Bonin, Lothar von Trotha

The 16th Division (16. Division) was a unit of the Prussian/German Army. It was formed as the 15th Division on September 5, 1818, in Koblenz from a troop brigade. It became the 16th Division on December 14, 1818, and moved its headquarters to Trier. The division was subordinated in peacetime to the VIII Army Corps (VIII. Armeekorps). The division was disbanded in 1919 during the demobilization of the German Army after World War I. It was mainly recruited in the densely populated Prussian Rhine Province, mainly along the Rhine and the cities and towns along the Moselle River.

== Combat chronicle ==
The 16th Division fought in the Austro-Prussian War in 1866, seeing action in the Battle of Königgrätz. In the Franco-Prussian War of 1870-71, the division fought in the Battle of Spicheren, the Battle of Mars-la-Tour, the Battle of Gravelotte (also called the Battle of Gravelotte-St. Privat) and the Siege of Metz, and then in the battles of Amiens, Hallue, and St. Quentin.

During World War I, the division marched through Luxembourg, Belgium and France, in what became known to the Allies as the Great Retreat, culminating in the First Battle of the Marne. In 1916, it fought in the Battle of the Somme. The division was briefly sent to the Eastern Front in late 1916. It saw action in 1917 in the Battle of Passchendaele, also known as the Third Battle of Ypres. It participated in the 1918 German spring offensive, including the Battle of the Lys, and defended against the Allied counteroffensives, including the Second Battle of the Somme. The 16th Infantry Division was a highly regarded division early in the war, known as the Iron Division, but by 1918 Allied intelligence rated it a second class division.

== Order of battle in the Franco-Prussian War ==
During wartime, the 16th Division, like other regular German divisions, was redesignated an infantry division. The organization of the 16th Infantry Division in 1870 at the beginning of the Franco-Prussian War was as follows:

- 31. Infanterie-Brigade
  - Infanterie-Regiment Nr. 29
  - Infanterie-Regiment Nr. 69
- 32. Infanterie-Brigade
  - Füsilier-Regiment Nr. 40
  - Infanterie-Regiment Nr. 72
- Husaren-Regiment Nr. 9

== Pre-World War I organization ==
German divisions underwent various organizational changes after the Franco-Prussian War. The 16th Division received a new infantry brigade, the 80th, in 1897. It lost the 32nd Infantry Brigade, whose recruiting area was outside the Rhineland. The 15th Division's 30th Infantry Brigade then went to the 16th Division in exchange for the 80th Infantry Brigade. The organization of the 16th Division in 1914, shortly before the outbreak of World War I, was as follows:

- 30. Infanterie-Brigade:
  - Infanterie-Regiment von Goeben (2. Rheinisches) Nr. 28
  - 6. Rheinisches Infanterie-Regiment Nr. 68
- 31. Infanterie-Brigade:
  - Infanterie-Regiment von Horn (3. Rheinisches) Nr. 29
  - 7. Rheinisches Infanterie-Regiment Nr. 69
- 16. Kavallerie-Brigade
  - Jäger-Regiment zu Pferde Nr. 7
  - Jäger-Regiment zu Pferde Nr. 8
- 16. Feldartillerie-Brigade
  - 2. Rheinisches Feldartillerie-Regiment Nr. 23
  - Triersches Feldartillerie-Regiment Nr. 44

== Order of battle on mobilization ==
On mobilization in August 1914 at the beginning of World War I, most divisional cavalry, including brigade headquarters, was withdrawn to form cavalry divisions or split up among divisions as reconnaissance units. Divisions received engineer companies and other support units from their higher headquarters. The 16th Division was again renamed the 16th Infantry Division. Its initial wartime organization was as follows:

- 30. Infanterie-Brigade:
  - Infanterie-Regiment von Goeben (2. Rheinisches) Nr. 28
  - 6. Rheinisches Infanterie-Regiment Nr. 68
- 31. Infanterie-Brigade:
  - Infanterie-Regiment von Horn (3. Rheinisches) Nr. 29
  - 7. Rheinisches Infanterie-Regiment Nr. 69
- Husaren-Regiment König Wilhelm I. (1. Rheinisches) Nr. 7
- 16. Feldartillerie-Brigade:
  - 2. Rheinisches Feldartillerie-Regiment Nr. 23
  - Triersches Feldartillerie-Regiment Nr. 44
- 2.Kompanie/1. Rheinisches Pionier-Bataillon Nr. 8
- 3.Kompanie/1. Rheinisches Pionier-Bataillon Nr. 8

== Late World War I organization ==
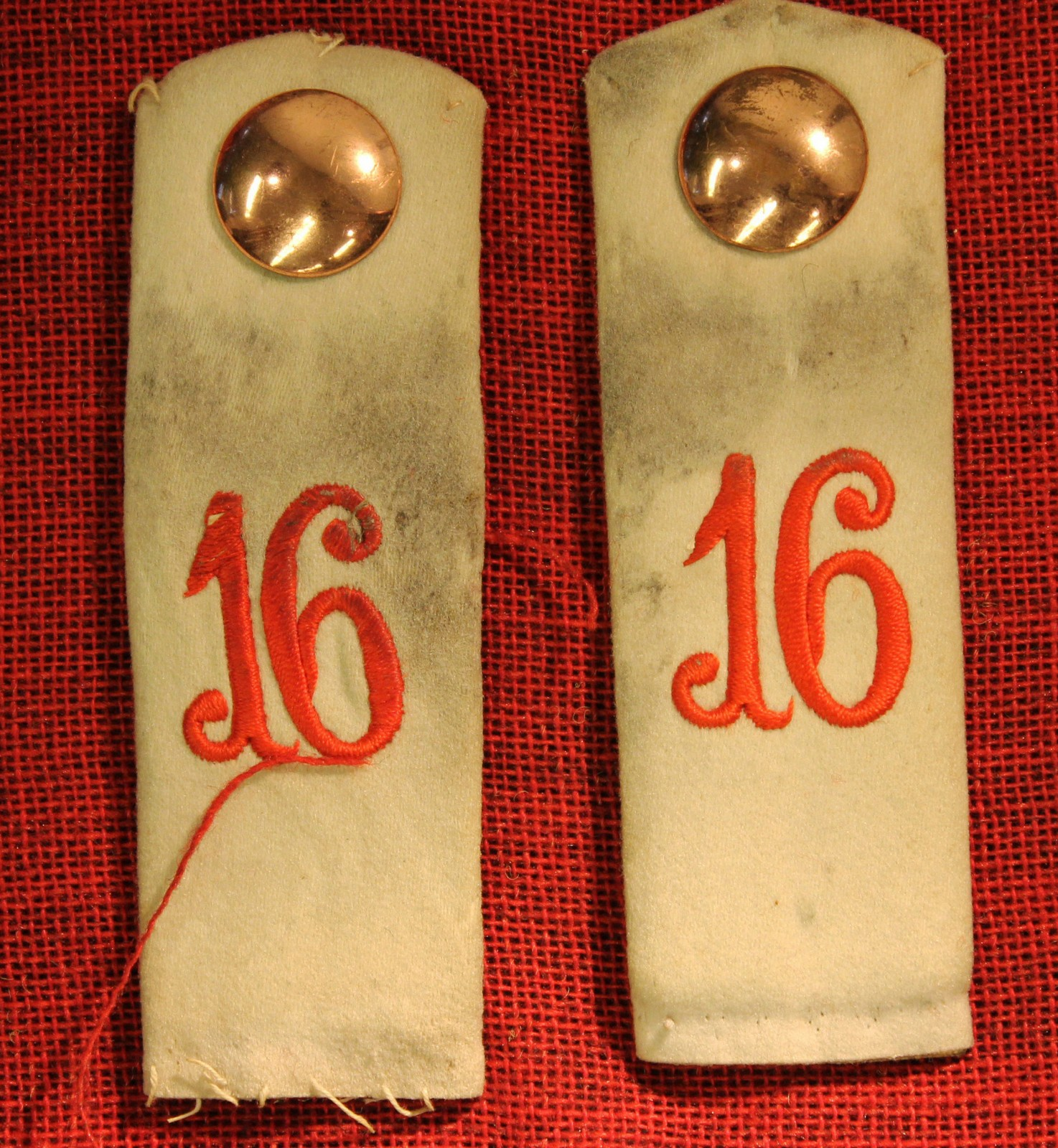
WWI German army shoulder straps indicating "16" (16th Division

Divisions underwent many changes during the war, with regiments moving from division to division, and some being destroyed and rebuilt. During the war, most divisions became triangular - one infantry brigade with three infantry regiments rather than two infantry brigades of two regiments (a "square division"). An artillery commander replaced the artillery brigade headquarters, the cavalry was further reduced, the engineer contingent was increased, and a divisional signals command was created. The 16th Infantry Division's order of battle on March 25, 1918, was as follows:

- 30. Infanterie-Brigade:
  - Infanterie-Regiment von Goeben (2. Rheinisches) Nr. 28
  - Infanterie-Regiment von Horn (3. Rheinisches) Nr. 29
  - 6. Rheinisches Infanterie-Regiment Nr. 68
- 1.Eskadron/Husaren-Regiment König Wilhelm I. (1. Rheinisches) Nr. 7
- Artillerie-Kommandeur 16:
  - 2. Rheinisches Feldartillerie-Regiment Nr. 23
  - Fußartillerie-Bataillon Nr. 32
- Stab/1. Rheinisches Pionier-Bataillon Nr. 8
  - 2.Kompanie/1. Rheinisches Pionier-Bataillon Nr. 8
  - 3.Kompanie/1. Rheinisches Pionier-Bataillon Nr. 8
  - Minenwerfer-Kompanie Nr. 169
- Divisions-Nachrichten-Kommandeur 16
