= Erzieher des Preußischen Heeres =

Book series

Erzieher des Preußischen Heeres (Educators of the Prussian Army) is the title of a German historical book series from the early 20th century that presents biographies and works of significant military figures of Prussia.

It was edited by the Prussian officer (Lieutenant General) and military writer Gerhard von Pelet-Narbonne (de) (1840-1909) and renowned German military officers contributed to the creation of the collection. Lieutenant General Rudolf von Caemmerer (de) in 1905, for example, wrote about Clausewitz. The series in twelve volumes was published in the years 1905-1907 by the publishers Stalling (Leipzig; Oldenburg; Berlin) and Behr (Berlin). The volumes are:

According to an article in Jahresberichte der Geschichtswissenschaft the collection includes many items that are not widely known. Author Brigitte Robenek comments on the series: "Although the authors of the individual volumes are all senior officers, they have done an excellent job of keeping the descriptions in a language that is easy to understand, even for non-military circles, and which is popular in the best sense of the word."

== Volumes ==
- 1 Friedrich Wilhelm. Der Große Kurfürst von Brandenburg. Pelet-Narbonne, Gerhard von. Leipzig: Stalling, [1905], 2nd ed.
- 2 König Friedrich Wilhelm I und Fürst Leopold I zu Anhalt-Dessau. Linnebach, Karl. Berlin: Behr, 1907
- 3 Friedrich der Große. Bremen, Walter von. Leipzig: Stalling, [1905], 2nd ed.
- 4 Yorck. Voss, Wilhelm von. Leipzig: Stalling, [1906], 3rd ed.
- 5 Scharnhorst. Lignitz, Viktor von. Leipzig: Stalling, [1905], 2nd ed.
- 6 Gneisenau. Friederich, Rudolf. Leipzig: Stalling, [1906], 3rd ed.
- 7 Boyen. Boeck, Fritz von der, Stalling, [1906], 3rd ed.
- 8 Clausewitz. Caemmerer, Rudolf von. Leipzig: Stalling, [1905], 2nd ed.
- 9 Prinz Friedrich Karl von Preußen. Balck, William. Leipzig: Stalling, 1906, 2nd ed.
- 10 Moltke. Blume, Wilhelm von. Berlin: Behr, 1907
- 11/12 Kaiser Wilhelm der Große und Roon. Blume, Wilhelm von. Leipzig: Stalling, 1906
