= 12th Division (German Empire) =

Military unit of the Prussian/German Army

12th Division (12. Division); in 1870-71 and from August 2, 1914, 12th Infantry Division (12. Infanterie-Division)
- Seal stamp of the 12th Division
- Active: 1818–1919
- Country: Prussia/Germany
- Branch: Army
- Type: Infantry (in peacetime included cavalry)
- Size: Approx. 15,000
- Part of: VI. Army Corps (VI. Armeekorps)
- Garrison/HQ: Neiße
- Engagements: Austro-Prussian War: Königgrätz Franco-Prussian War: Paris World War I: Somme, Caporetto, German spring offensive, Lys, Cambrai (1918)

Commanders
- Notable commanders: Eduard von Bonin, Kraft, Prinz zu Hohenlohe-Ingelfingen, Remus von Woyrsch

The 12th Division (12. Division) was a unit of the Prussian/German Army. It was formed in Neiße (now Nysa, Poland) on September 5, 1818. The division was subordinated in peacetime to the VI Army Corps (VI. Armeekorps). The division was disbanded in 1919 during the demobilization of the German Army after World War I. The division was recruited primarily in the Province of Silesia, mainly in the region of Upper Silesia.

== Combat chronicle ==
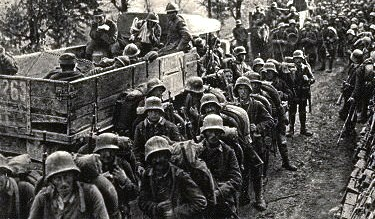
The 12th division marches along the Isonzo river in the Battle of Caporetto

The 12th Division fought in the Austro-Prussian War in 1866, including the Battle of Königgrätz. In the Franco-Prussian War of 1870-71, the division fought in several battles and engagements, including the Siege of Paris.

In World War I, the division served initially on the Western Front. It spent most of this period in various parts of the trenches and suffered heavily in the 1916 Battle of the Somme. At the end of December 1916, it was sent to the Eastern Front, where it did not participate in any major actions. The division returned to the Western Front in May–June 1917. At the end of September 1917, it was sent to the Italian Front, where it fought in the Battle of Caporetto. After returning to the Western Front, the division saw action in the German spring offensive of 1918, including the Battle of the Lys, and the subsequent Allied counteroffensives, including the 1918 Battle of Cambrai. The division was rated as a good second-class division by Allied intelligence.

== Order of battle in the Franco-Prussian War ==
During wartime, the 12th Division, like other regular German divisions, was redesignated an infantry division. The organization of the 12th Infantry Division in 1870 at the beginning of the Franco-Prussian War was as follows:

- 23. Infanterie-Brigade
  - Infanterie-Regiment Nr. 22
  - Infanterie-Regiment Nr. 62
- 24. Infanterie-Brigade
  - Infanterie-Regiment Nr. 23
  - Infanterie-Regiment Nr. 63
- Dragoner-Regiment Nr. 15

== Pre-World War I organization ==
German divisions underwent various organizational changes after the Franco-Prussian War. The organization of the 12th Division in 1914, shortly before the outbreak of World War I, was as follows:

- 23. Infanterie-Brigade
  - Infanterie-Regiment Keith (1. Oberschlesisches) Nr. 22
  - 3. Schlesisches Infanterie-Regiment Nr. 156
- 24. Infanterie-Brigade
  - Infanterie-Regiment von Winterfeldt (2. Oberschlesisches) Nr. 23
  - 3. Oberschlesisches Infanterie-Regiment Nr. 62
- 78. Infanterie-Brigade
  - 4. Oberschlesisches Infanterie-Regiment Nr. 63
  - 4. Schlesisches Infanterie-Regiment Nr. 157
- 12. Kavallerie-Brigade
  - Husaren-Regiment von Schill (1. Schlesisches) Nr. 4
  - Husaren-Regiment Graf Goetzen (2. Schlesisches) Nr. 6
- 44. Kavallerie-Brigade
  - Ulanen-Regiment von Katzler (Schlesisches) Nr. 2
  - Jäger-Regiment zu Pferde Nr. 11
- 12. Feldartillerie-Brigade:
  - Feldartillerie-Regiment von Clausewitz (1. Oberschlesisches) Nr. 21
  - 2. Oberschlesisches Feldartillerie-Regiment Nr. 57

== Order of battle on mobilization ==
On mobilization in August 1914 at the beginning of World War I, most divisional cavalry, including brigade headquarters, was withdrawn to form cavalry divisions or split up among divisions as reconnaissance units. Divisions received engineer companies and other support units from their higher headquarters. The 12th Division was again renamed the 12th Infantry Division. Its initial wartime organization was as follows:

- 24. Infanterie-Brigade:
  - Infanterie-Regiment von Winterfeldt (2. Oberschlesisches) Nr. 23
  - 3. Oberschlesisches Infanterie-Regiment Nr. 62
- 78. Infanterie-Brigade:
  - 4. Oberschlesisches Infanterie-Regiment Nr.63
  - 4. Schlesisches Infanterie-Regiment Nr. 157
- Ulanen-Regiment von Katzler (Schlesisches) Nr. 2
- 12. Feldartillerie-Brigade:
  - Feldartillerie-Regiment von Clausewitz (1. Oberschlesisches) Nr. 21
  - 2. Oberschlesisches Feldartillerie-Regiment Nr. 57
- 2. Kompanie/Schlesisches Pionier-Bataillon Nr. 6
- 3. Kompanie/Schlesisches Pionier-Bataillon Nr. 6

== Late World War I organization ==
Divisions underwent many changes during the war, with regiments moving from division to division, and some being destroyed and rebuilt. During the war, most divisions became triangular - one infantry brigade with three infantry regiments rather than two infantry brigades of two regiments (a "square division"). An artillery commander replaced the artillery brigade headquarters, the cavalry was further reduced, the engineer contingent was increased, and a divisional signals command was created. The 12th Infantry Division's order of battle in 1918 was as follows:

- 24. Infanterie-Brigade:
  - Infanterie-Regiment von Winterfeldt (2. Oberschlesisches) Nr. 23
  - 3. Oberschlesisches Infanterie-Regiment Nr. 62
  - 4. Oberschlesisches Infanterie-Regiment Nr. 63
  - Maschinengewehr-Scharfschützen-Abteilung Nr. 20
- 4. Eskadron/Ulanen-Regiment von Katzler (Schlesisches) Nr. 2
- Artillerie-Kommandeur 12:
  - Feldartillerie-Regiment von Clausewitz (1. Oberschlesisches) Nr. 21
  - Fußartillerie-Bataillon Nr. 88
- Schlesisches Pionier-Bataillon Nr. 6
- Divisions-Nachrichten-Kommandeur 12
