= Friedrich Graf von Waldersee =

Prussian Lieutenant General and military author

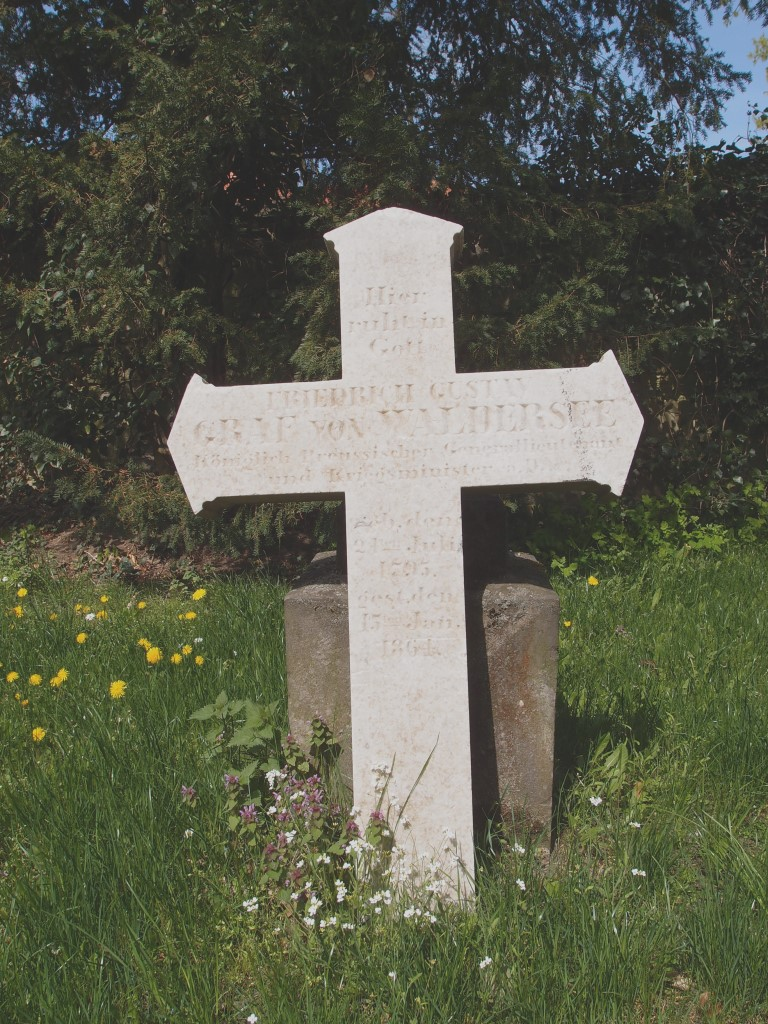
His grave at the Alter Friedhof in Potsdam.

Friedrich Gustav Graf von Waldersee (born 21 July 1795 in Dessau, died 15 January 1864 in Potsdam) was a Prussian Lieutenant General and military author.

== Biography ==
Friedrich Graf von Waldersee was a son of Franz Graf Waldersee, illegitimate son of Leopold III, Duke of Anhalt-Dessau. His brother was Franz Heinrich Graf von Waldersee, his nephew Alfred von Waldersee. On 2 July 1823 he married Ottilie von Wedel (1803-1882) in Silligsdorf. The marriage produced the following children:

- Gustav Ludwig Otto Eduard von Waldersee (1826–1861)
- Rudolf Karl von Waldersee (1827–1870)
- Helene von Waldersee (1830–1869)
- Bertha von Waldersee (1833–1884)

Von Waldersee was a Prussian officer and professional soldier, and later commander of the "Gardekorps Kaiser Alexander Garde-Grenadier-Regiment Nr. 1" in Berlin. He was Prussian Minister of War from 1854 to 1858 in Manteuffel cabinet. As commander of the Prussian troops in Dresden he succeeded in suppressing the 1849 May Uprising in Dresden.

His written works dealt with infantry training and some of them have over a hundred editions printed.

== Works ==
- Der Kampf in Dresden im Mai 1849. Mit besonderer Rücksicht auf die Mitwirkung der Preußischen Truppen geschildert und militairisch beleuchtet, Berlin 1849.
- Der Dienst des Infanterieunteroffiziers. Berlin spätere Aufl. 1895
- Leitfaden für den Unterricht des Infanteristen. Berlin 1903.

Political offices
Preceded by Eduard von Bonin	Prussian Minister of War; 1854–1858	Succeeded by Eduard von Bonin
