= Battle of Warsaw (1656) =

Part of the Second Northern War

Coordinates: 52.2323°N 21.0084°E

- Part of the Second Northern War / The Deluge
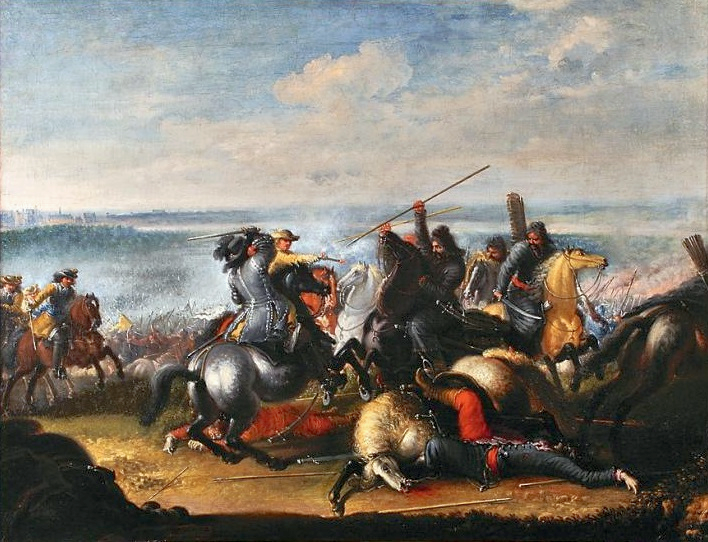
- Swedish King Charles X Gustav in skirmish with Polish Tartars near Warsaw 1656, by Johann Philip Lemke
Date	July 28–30, 1656
Location	near Warsaw, Poland
Result	Swedish-Brandenburger victory
Territorial changes	Warsaw is captured by the Swedish-Brandenburger army

Belligerents
(yes) Swedish Empire; Brandenburg-Prussia	Polish–Lithuanian Commonwealth; Crimean Khanate

Commanders and leaders
(yes) Charles X Gustav (WIA) (Margraviate of Brandenburg) Frederick William (Margraviate of Brandenburg) Otto von Sparr	John II Casimir

Strength
9,500 Swedish; 8,500 Prussians; Total: 18,000–20,000: 5,500 infantry 12,500 cavalry 80 cannons	36,000–39,000 Polish–Lithuanian; 2,000 Crimean Tatars; Total: about 40,000–100,000: 4,500 infantry 35,500 cavalry

Casualties and losses
Between 700 and 1,300 men	Between 2,000 and 4,000 men

The Battle of Warsaw (German: Schlacht von Warschau; Polish: Bitwa pod Warszawą; Swedish: Tredagarsslaget vid Warschau) took place near Warsaw on July 28–July 30 [O.S. July 18–20] 1656, between the armies of the Polish–Lithuanian Commonwealth and Sweden and Brandenburg. It was a major battle in the Second Northern War between Poland and Sweden in the period 1655–1660, also known as The Deluge. According to Hajo Holborn, it marked "the beginning of Prussian military history".

In the battle, a smaller Swedish-Brandenburg force, but with the fire superiority of infantry and artillery, gained tactical victory over a Polish–Lithuanian force superior in numbers, though in the long term the victory achieved little. Polish–Lithuanian losses were insignificant, since the Polish-Lithuanian forces, including the sizeable noble levy, retreated in good order from the battlefield.

== Background ==
The Polish–Lithuanian forces, commanded by King John II Casimir of Poland, comprised about 24–25,000 regulars, which included only 950 Winged Hussars (8 banners), 2,000 Tatars and 10–13,000 of the noble levy (pospolite ruszenie), altogether some 40,000 men of which only about 4,500 were infantry. Other sources say the total was 100,000 men. The allied armies of Sweden and Brandenburg, commanded by King Charles X of Sweden and Elector Frederick William of Brandenburg, were only 18,000 or 20,000 strong, comprising 12,500 cavalry (60 squadrons), and 5,500 infantry (15 brigades), which included 8,500 Brandenburg men. Second in command of Brandenburg's forces was Otto Christoph von Sparr.

John II Casimir ferried his army across the Vistula River and met the approaching Swedish-Brandenburg force on its right bank, about five kilometers to the north of the suburb of Praga. Charles X had initially hoped to destroy the Lithuanian and Tatar forces before they joined up with the remainder of the Commonwealth army, but this plan failed. Some officers of Brandenburg considered the Polish–Lithuanian forces to be overwhelming in numbers and instead advocated a retreat.

== Battle ==
=== First day ===
Charles marched his allied army down the right (east) bank of the Vistula on 28 July and assaulted the Polish army. However, the Polish infantry had dug into a narrow corridor along the river bank, which prevented them from being dislodged.

=== Second day ===
Charles, wheeling left, moved his entire army to the Polish right, through the Białołęka Forest onto a narrow plain, consolidating his position before the Polish hussars could react. Aleksander Polbinski's 800 hussars drove into the three lines of cavalry, reiter, guarding the flanks of Charles' infantry. The hussars broke through the first line of Uppland and Småland regiments, but deprived of support, they were stopped by the flank fire of the Swedish regiments. As a result of the attack, Charles Gustav was in danger and wounded. The kozacka cavalry, the pancerna, did not participate in the attack, being held in reserve. Seeing that the Swede-Brandenburg allies held their ground, John II Casimir withdrew his army across the Vistula bridge, covered by his cavalry.

=== Third day ===
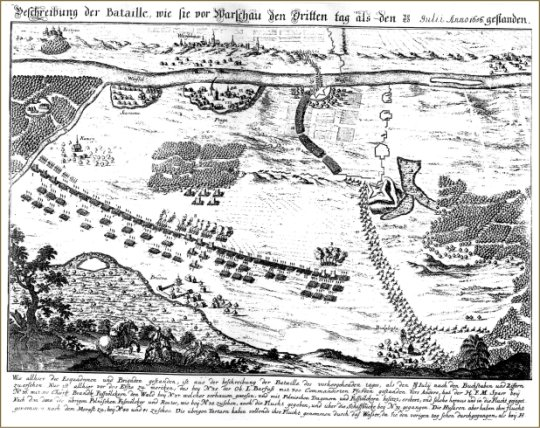
"Battle of Warsaw on the third day", a contemporary map

The Swede and Brandenburg allies occupied the open plain and the Polish–Lithuanian cavalry escaped along the Vistula and John Casimir abandoned Warsaw again.

== Aftermath ==
Despite the operational success of the Swedish Army, the Polish-Lithuanian army retreated unbroken. Thanks to Jan Kazimierz's decision to retreat, the Poles and Lithuanians suffered relatively few losses. In the afternoon of 30 July, a war council was convened at the Royal Castle. In a situation where Polish forces were divided - infantry, the massed troops and a small part of the cavalry crossed to the left bank of the Vistula, while most of the cavalry remained on the right bank - Jan Kazimierz decided to leave Warsaw. This was strongly opposed by Queen Ludwika Maria, the Great Chancellor of the Crown, Stefan Koryciński, and the Voivode of Łęczyca, Jan Leszczyński. The queen even threatened that if the king and his army left the city, she would stay and defend the capital with her frauche. However, Jan Kazimierz succumbed to the widespread panic and, having failed to ensure the proper evacuation of his equipment, especially his cannons, left Warsaw before the evening.

The Polish-Lithuanian army lost 2,000 men in the battle (including 600 infantry, close to 1,000 regular cavalry and the fallen from the Bełsk and Sandomierz common ranks, along with journeymen), while the Swedish-Brandenburgian army lost around 1,000. Although the Tartars numbered only 2,000, they made their presence felt, snatching as many as 200 carts from the Elector without suffering too many losses. The plague, which soon broke out among Charles Gustav's troops, added several hundred more soldiers to their losses.

The Brandenburg and Swedish allies occupied Radom on 10 Aug., and the Brandenburg garrisons replaced the Swedes in Wielkopolska, but then they refused to support the Swedes any further, forcing Charles to withdraw north to Royal Prussia. John Casimir quickly regrouped at Lublin.

The Battle of Warsaw is commemorated on the Tomb of the Unknown Soldier, Warsaw, with the inscription "Warszawa 30 V-1 VII, 28–30 VII 1656".

== See also ==
- Brandenburg-Prussia

== Works cited ==
- Sundberg, Ulf (2018). "Carl Gustaf Wrangel: En mästare till sjöss och lands". Sveriges tio främsta fältherrar: stormaktstiden 1561-1718 [Sweden's ten greatest generals: the period of great power 1561-1718] (in Swedish). Svenskt militärhistoriskt bibliotek. ISBN 9789188053787.
