= Otto Christoph von Sparr =

17th-century Prussian Generalfeldmarschall

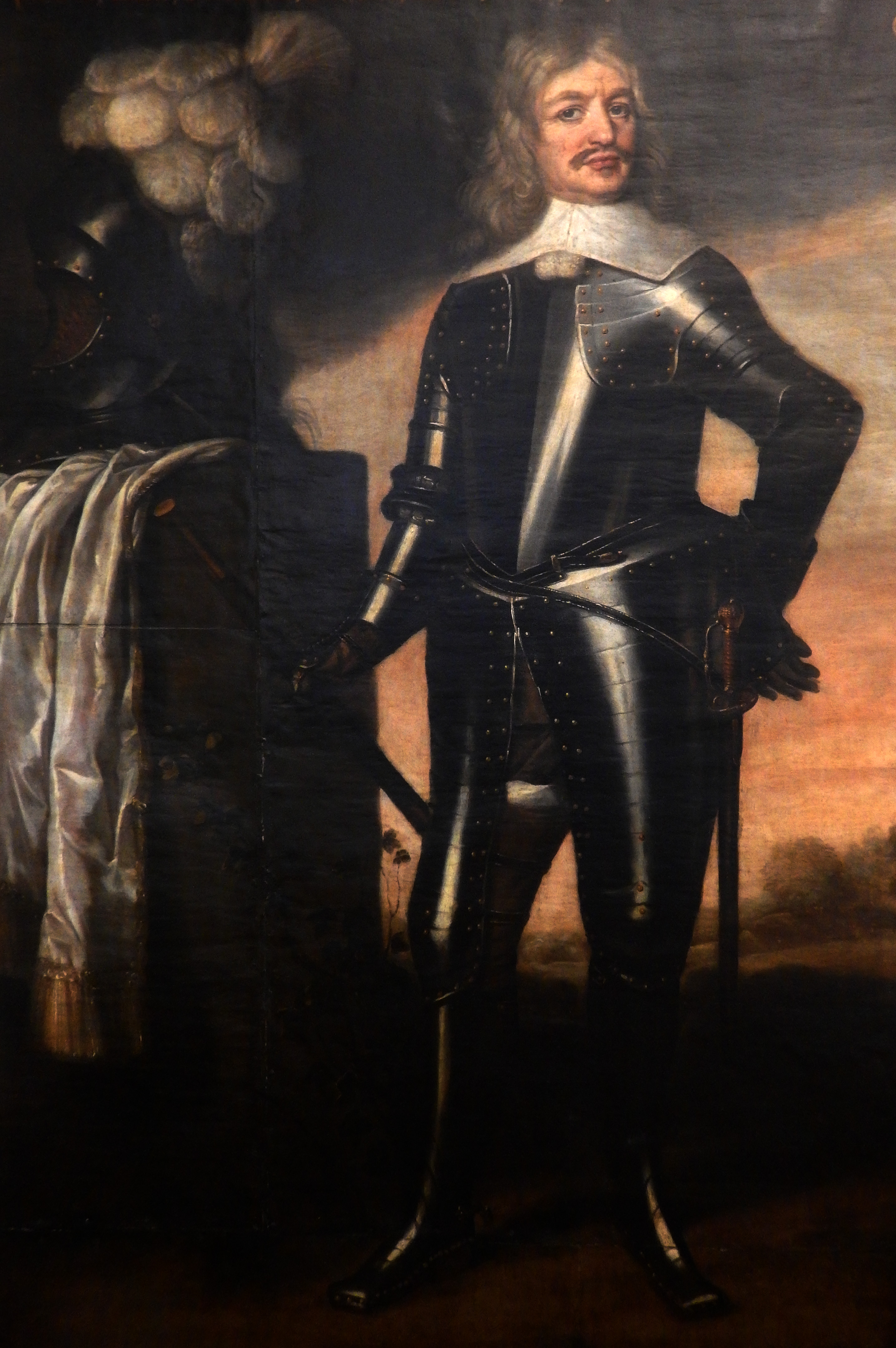
A painting of him

Otto Christoph Freiherr von Sparr (13 November 1599 or 1605 – 9 May 1668) was a Generalfeldmarschall of Brandenburg-Prussia.

Sparr came from a noble family from the Margraviate of Brandenburg. He was born either in Lichterfelde near Eberswalde in 1599 or Prenden near Bernau in 1605.

Sparr was an imperial officer during the Thirty Years' War. He campaignly mainly in northwestern Germany during the war, having a largely independent command in Westphalia. He besieged Essen in 1641 and fought near Stargard. Sparr was captured near Warendorf.

After the war in 1649, Sparr led the Electorate of Cologne's campaign against Liège; in December of that year he entered the service of Frederick William, Elector of Brandenburg.

The troops from the various territories of Elector Frederick William had traditionally been in separate commands. In 1651, the elector granted Sparr command over all garrison troops outside of Brandenburg and the Duchy of Prussia; command over all of Brandenburg-Prussia's troops followed in 1655. Sparr acted as Frederick William's Chief of Staff when the elector personally led troops, such as at the 1656 Battle of Warsaw. During the final day of the battle, Generalfeldzeugmeister (Master of Ordnance) von Sparr led Brandenburg's successful assault on the Polish forces. He was promoted to Field Marshal in 1657.

Sparr fought against Sweden in 1658 and conquered the fortress of Demmin the following year. From 1663-64 he led Brandenburg's contingent in Hungary against the Ottoman Empire, for which he was named an imperial Generalfeldmarschall and Reichsgraf. His last command was the submission of Magdeburg in 1666.

Sparr was a proponent of artillery and pioneers. He also began to develop a group of officers into what became the General Staff.

Sparr died in Prenden in 1668. His tomb, designed by Artus Quellinus, is in Berlin's Marienkirche. In 1892, the Berlin suburb Wedding named the street Sparrstraße (after 1897 Sparrplatz) after the field marshal.
