= Georgii Isserson =

Soviet military commander and Military Theorist (1898–1976)

- Born: Georgii Samuelovich Isserson Георгий Самойлович Иссерсон; 16 June 1898; Kovno, Russian Empire (now Lithuania)
- Died: 27 April 1976 (aged 77); Moscow, Russian SFSR, Soviet Union
- Military career
- Allegiance: Russian Empire (Russian Soviet Federative Socialist Republic) Russian SFSR; Soviet Union
- Branch: Imperial Russian Army; Red Army
- Service years: 1916–1941
- Rank: Kombrig; Colonel
- Conflicts: World War I Russian Civil War; Winter War
- Awards: Order of the Red Star (twice)

Georgii Samuelovich Isserson (Russian: Георгий Самойлович Иссерсон; 3 August 1896 – 27 April 1976) was a Soviet military officer and military theorist. He was one of the originators of the theory of deep battle in the 1930s, together with Vladimir Triandafillov and Nikolai Varfolomeev working for Marshall Mikhail Tukhachevsky.

== Biography ==
=== Early life ===
Isserson was born the son of Isser-Samuel Elshevich Isserson, a physician, and Betty Isadorovna Shereshskaya, in Kovno (now Kaunas, Lithuania). His family was Jewish. Isserson completed three terms at the Saint Petersburg State University studying law, before being drafted into the Imperial Russian Army in 1916. He fought in World War I, joined the Red Army as a volunteer in 1918 and fought in the Russian Civil War.

=== Military career ===
- 1918-21 - Served in the Political Department of the 6th Army; military commissar of the 159th Rifle Regiment; assistant commander of the 154th Rifle Regiment
- 1921-24 - studied at the Red Army Military Academy; graduated in 1924
- March 1923 – February 1924: Chief of the Intelligence Department, Headquarters of the Western Front
- 1925–1927: Chief of the Operations Department, Headquarters of the Leningrad Military District
- 1927: Chief of the 1st Section, 1st Directorate of the Leningrad Military District Headquarters
- 1927–1930: Chief of Staff, 10th Rifle Corps
- From 1929 he studied at the Frunze Military Academy: 1930–1931, postgraduate student (adjunct); 1931–1932, instructor; 1932–1933, Head of the Operations Faculty
- 1936: Deputy Chief of the 1st Department of the Red Army General Staff
- 1936–1937: Head of the Army Operations Department at the General Staff Military Academy (reorganized in 1937 into the Department of Operational Art)
- 1937–1938: At the disposal of the Red Army Command Personnel Directorate
- 1938–1939: Head of the Department of Operational Art at the General Staff Military Academy; Professor
- December 17–30, 1939: Chief of Staff of the 7th Army

1940–1941: At the disposal of the People's Commissariat for Defence of the USSR

=== Arrest and subsequent life ===
Isserson was arrested on 7 June 1941. He was sentenced to death on 21 January 1942 by the Military Tribunal of the Volga Military District for participating in a military conspiracy and committing criminal acts during the Soviet-Finnish War. Isserson was reprieved by the Military Collegium of the Supreme Court of the USSR on 10 March 1942 who commuted his sentence to ten years of imprisonment in a corrective labour camp.

He served his sentence in the Karaganda Corrective Labour Camp. Upon completion of his term, he was sent into internal exile in Krasnoyarsk Krai. There, he worked as a pump station operator and engaged in topographic surveying with geological exploration parties.

Isserson was rehabilitated on 1 June 1955, and released on 14 July 1955. In August 1955, he was retired with the rank of colonel (the 1941 order dismissing him from the Red Army due to his arrest was simultaneously revoked). He resumed publishing in military journals and worked as a civilian employee on the editorial staff of the journal Voennaya Mysl (Military Thought).

He died in Moscow in 1976 and is buried at Novodevichy Cemetery (New Territory, columbarium, section 134).

== Assessment ==
Academician of the Russian Academy of Sciences A. A. Kokoshin—who served as the sixth secretary of the Security Council of Russia—speaks very highly of several works by Isserson. He particularly praises the book New Forms of Warfare (published in 1940), in which the Soviet military theorist successfully provided a fundamental assessment of the novel strategic actions employed by the German Wehrmacht during the early stages of World War II—specifically, the rapid defeat of Poland by Germany in the autumn of 1939. Kokoshin believes that Isserson identified and described with exceptional precision the essence of the "unprecedented strategic surprise" of 1939—a phenomenon the Wehrmacht would go on to execute again in both 1940 and 1941. Among his most important works on operational art were The Evolution of Operational Art (1932 and 1937) and Fundamentals of the Deep Operation (1936). The latter work remains classified to this day.

Isserson concentrated on depth and the role it played in operations and strategy. According to his view, strategy had moved on from Napoleonic times and the strategy of a single point (the decisive battle) and the Moltke era of linear strategy. The continuous front that developed in the First World War would not allow the flanking moves of the pre-1914 period. Isserson argued that the front had become devoid of open flanks and military art faced a challenge to develop new methods to break through a deeply echeloned defence. To this end he wrote that "we are at the dawn of a new epoch in military art, and must move from a linear strategy to a deep strategy.

== Works ==
In the Russian language:

- Иссерсон Г. С. Германия. Часть II. М.: Издание разведывательного управления Штаба РККА, 1922.
- Иссерсон Г. С. Современная германская пехота. М.: Издание разведывательного отдела Штаба РККА, 1923.
- Иссерсон Г. С. Канны Мировой войны (Гибель армии Самсонова). (недоступная ссылка) М.: Госвоениздат, 1926.
- Иссерсон Г. С. Мартовское наступление германцев в Пикардии. М.: Госвоениздат, 1926.
- Иссерсон Г. С. Эволюция оперативного искусства. М.: Госвоениздат, 1932. (2-е доп. изд. 1937).
- Иссерсон Г. С. Военное искусство эпохи национальных войн второй половины XIX века. М.: Издание академии им. М.В. Фрунзе, 1933.
- Иссерсон Г. С. Лекции по глубокой тактике. М.: Краснознаменная военная академия РККА, 1933.
- Иссерсон Г. С. Основы оборонительной операции (Конспект). М.: Академия Генерального Штаба, 1938.
- Иссерсон Г. С. Основы ведения операции. Конспект. Выпуск II. М.: Академия Генерального Штаба, 1939.
- Иссерсон Г. С. Новые формы борьбы. М.: Военгиз, 1940.

== Sources ==
This article is translated from Russian Language Wikipedia.

- Georgii Samoilovich Isserson and Bruce W. Menning, The Evolution of Operational Art , Fort Leawenworth (Kansas), Combat Studies Institute Press, 2013. (https://www.armyupress.army.mil/Portals/7/combat-studies-institute/csi-books/OperationalArt.pdf)
- Richard Harrison, Architect of Soviet Victory in World War II: The Life and Theories of G.S. Isserson , Jefferson, North Carolina, McFarland & Co Inc., 2010.
- Georgii Isserson (1898–1976) - WarHistory.org page at war History
- Biography of Komdiv Georgii Samoilovich Isserson - (Георгий Самойлович Иссерсон) (1898 – 1976), Soviet Union -page at Generals.dk
