= Varfolomeev =

Varfolomeev or Varfolomeyev (Russian: Варфоломеев) is a Russian masculine surname derived from the given name Varfolomey, its feminine counterpart is Varfolomeeva or Varfolomeyeva. It may refer to the following notable people:

- Alexander Varfolomeev (born 1965), Russian politician
- Darja Varfolomeev (born 2006), Russian-born German rhythmic gymnast
- Dmitri Varfolomeyev (disambiguation), multiple people
- Ivan Varfolomeyev (born 2004), Ukrainian football player
- Nikolai Varfolomeev (1890–1939), Soviet military commander
- Sergei Varfolomeyev (born 1968), Russian football player
- Valery Varfolomeyev (born 1971), Russian Navy officer
