= Combined arms =

Approach to warfare

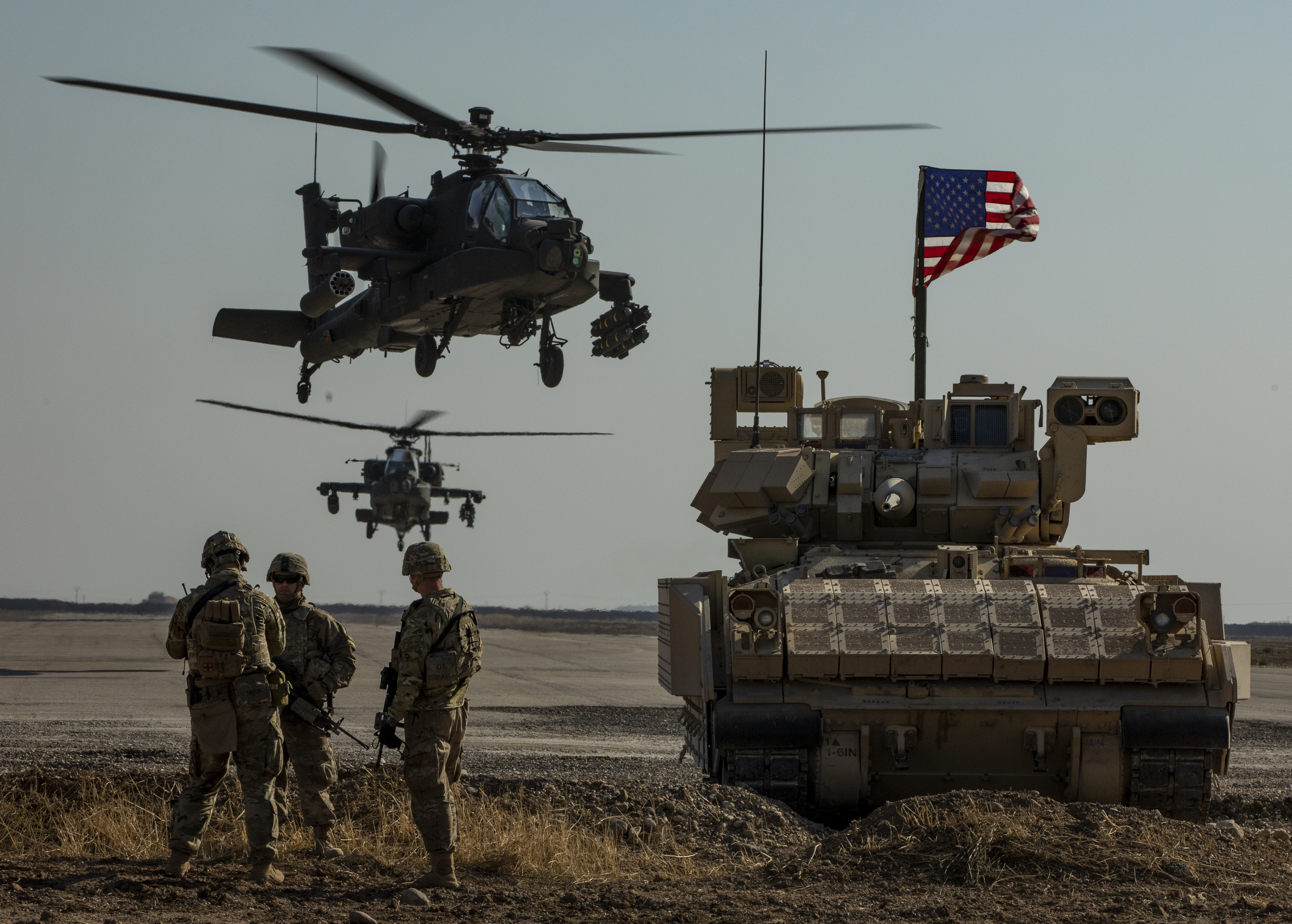
Infantry, armor, and aerial units of the United States Army together as part of Operation Inherent Resolve during the Syrian civil war in 2020

Combined arms is an approach to warfare that seeks to integrate different combat arms of a military to achieve mutually complementary effects—for example, using infantry and armour in an urban environment in which each supports the other.

According to the strategist William S. Lind, combined arms can be distinguished from the concept of "supporting arms" as follows:

Combined arms hits the enemy with two or more arms simultaneously in such a manner that the actions he must take to defend himself from one make him more vulnerable to another. In contrast, supporting arms is hitting the enemy with two or more arms in sequence, or if simultaneously, then in such combination that the actions the enemy must take to defend himself from one also defends himself from the other(s).

Though the lower-echelon units of a combined arms team may be of similar types, a balanced mixture of such units are combined into an effective higher-echelon unit, whether formally in a table of organization or informally in an ad hoc solution to a battlefield problem. For example, an armoured division, the modern paragon of combined arms doctrine, consists of a mixture of mechanized infantry, tank, artillery, reconnaissance, anti-air support, drone support, close air support and helicopter units, all of which are co-ordinated and directed by a unified command structure.

Also, most modern military units can, if the situation requires it, call on yet more branches of the military, such as infantry requesting space warfare, cyberwarfare or electromagnetic warfare support; or the bombing or shelling by military aircraft or naval forces to augment their ground offensive or protect their land forces. The mixing of arms is sometimes pushed down below the level at which homogeneity ordinarily prevails, such as by temporarily attaching a tank company to an infantry battalion.

== History ==
=== Ancient warfare ===
Combined arms operations date back to antiquity, where armies would usually field a screen of skirmishers to protect their spearmen during the approach to contact. Especially in the case of the Greek hoplites, however, the focus of military thinking lay almost exclusively on the heavy infantry. In more elaborate situations armies of various nationalities fielded different combinations of light, medium, or heavy infantry, light or heavy cavalry, chariotry, camelry, elephantry, and artillery (mechanical weapons). Combined arms in this context was how to best use the cooperating units, variously armed with side-arms, spears, or missile weapons in order to coordinate an attack to disrupt and then destroy the enemy like Epaminondas against the Spartan army in the battle of Leuctra.

Philip II of Macedon and Alexander the Great greatly improved upon the limited combined arms tactics of the Greek city-states and combined the newly created Macedonian phalanx with heavy cavalry and other forces. The phalanx would hold the opposing line in place, until the heavy cavalry could smash and break the enemy line by achieving local superiority.

The early Republic Roman Legion was a combined arms force and consisted of five classes of troops. Lightly equipped velites acted as skirmishers armed with light javelins. The hastati and principes formed the main attacking strength of the legion with swords and pila, whilst the triarii formed the defensive backbone of the legion fighting as spearmen (initially as a denser Greek phalanx and later as a looser spear wall formation) with long spears and large shields. The fifth class of troops were the equites (the cavalry), which were used for scouting, pursuit and to guard the flanks.

The Legion then became notionally a unit of heavy infantrymen armed with just sword and pilum, and fielded with a small attached auxiliary skirmishers and missile troops, and incorporated a small cavalry unit. The legion was sometimes also incorporated into a higher-echelon combined arms unit – e.g., in one period it was customary for a general to command two legions plus two similarly sized units of auxiliaries, lighter units useful as screens or for combat in rough terrain. Later during the Roman Empire, auxiliary soldiers outnumbered the core legionary troops.

Warfare in the ancient Iberian Peninsula also took a combined forces approach, with native fighters proving deft at transitioning between infantry and cavalry and supporting each others. Warriors would mount or dismount if needed, and would often carry a second warrior behind them on their back. Viriathus would use combined tactics to great effect against Rome.

The army of the Han dynasty is also an example, fielding mêlée infantry (equipped with a variety of different weapons ranging from swords to pikes to halberd-like weapons), archers, crossbowmen, and cavalry (ranging from horse archers to heavy lancers). One recorded tactical formation during the Han dynasty included three ranks of halberds, swordsmen, and spearmen, supported by crossbows, and with cavalry on the flanks.

Civilizations such as the Carthaginians and Sassanids also were known to have fielded a combination of infantry supported by powerful cavalry.

=== Post-Classical warfare ===
At the Battle of Hastings (1066) English infantry fighting from behind a shield wall were defeated by a Norman army consisting of archers, foot soldiers (infantry), and mounted knights (cavalry). One of the tactics used by the Normans was to tempt the English to leave the shield wall to attack retreating Norman infantry only to destroy them in the open with cavalry. Likewise Scottish sheltrons – which had been developed to counter the charges by English heavy cavalry, and had been used successfully against English cavalry at the Battle of Stirling Bridge (1297) – were destroyed at the Battle of Falkirk (1298) by English archers acting in concert with mounted knights. Both Hastings and Falkirk showed how combined arms could be used to defeat enemies relying on only one arm.

The English victories of Crécy, Poitiers and Agincourt were examples of a simple form of combined arms, with a combination of dismounted knights forming a foundation for formations of English longbowmen. The lightly protected longbowmen could down their French opponents at a distance, whilst the armoured men-at-arms could deal with any Frenchmen who made it to the English lines. This is the crux of combined arms: to allow a combination of forces to achieve what would be impossible for its constituent elements to do alone.

During the Middle Ages military forces used combined arms as a method of winning battles and furthering a war leader or king's long-term goals. Some historians claim that during the Middle Ages there was no strategic or tactical art to military combat. Kelly DeVries uses the Merriam-Webster definition of combat "as a general military engagement". In the pursuit of a leader's goals and self-interest tactical and strategic thinking was used along with taking advantage of the terrain and weather in choosing when and where to give battle. The simplest example is the combination of different specialties such as archers, infantry, cavalry (knights or shock mounted troops), and even peasant militia. At times, each force fought on its own and won or lost depending on the opposing military competence. During the Middle Ages leaders utilized a combination of these skilled and unskilled forces to win battles. An army that has multiple skills available can engage a larger force that incorporates mainly one or two types of troops.

Each type of military formation – infantry, archers, cavalry, or peasants – has certain advantages that the other does not have. Infantry allows a force to hold ground and in the event of overwhelming enemy forces withdraw into terrain that mounted troops cannot maneuver as easily, thus negating the advantage of the horse. Archers provide standoff with their bows or crossbows. Cavalry can maneuver faster and provide fast attack before the enemy has had time to prepare defenses. Peasants are more numerous and cheaper on the royal coffers. Over the long term the army can cross-train and learn the skills of the specialties to increase combat effectiveness. This is known as a combat multiplier today. The combination of the different skills help provide a commander the flexibility to minimize risk when it comes to engagements. The overall objective of any military force is to fight and win, while also preserving the largest number of combatants to carry on the larger strategic aims of the king. This can be seen in some of the engagements during the Middle Ages.

=== Early Modern warfare ===
==== 15th to 17th centuries ====
Generally the savanna cavalries of West Africa used a combined arms approach, seldom operating without supporting infantry.

The French army of the Valois kings, composed of heavily armoured gendarmes (professional versions of the medieval knight), Swiss and Landsknecht mercenary pikemen, and heavy cannons took form during the transition from the medieval way of war to the early modern period.

The late 15th century saw the development of combined pike and shot formations in Europe, starting with the colunelas of the Spanish general Gonzalo Fernández de Córdoba, evolving into the tercios of Habsburg Spain and the Imperial Army of the Holy Roman Emperor during the 16th century.

In Japan, at the battle of Nagashino (長篠の戦い) in 1575, forces of the Oda clan successfully employed combined arms against the Takeda clan, which heavily relied on cavalry. The Oda army erected palisades to protect their ashigaru musketeers that shot down the Takeda cavalry while their samurai cut down any enemies who managed to approach melee range.

The 17th century saw increasing use of combined arms at lower (regimental) level. King Gustavus Adolphus of Sweden was the proponent of the idea. For fire support he attached teams of "commanded musketeers" to cavalry units and fielded light 3-pounder guns to provide infantry units with organic artillery.

=== Modern warfare ===
In the eighteenth century, the concept of the legion was revived. Legions now consisted of musketeers, light infantry, dragoons and artillery in a brigade sized force. These legions often combined professional military personnel with militia. Perhaps the most notable example is the use of light cavalry, light infantry and light horse artillery in advance detachments by France's La Grande Armée during the Napoleonic Wars.

==== Napoleonic Wars ====
After 25 years of near continuous warfare, the armies that met at the Battle of Waterloo in 1815 were organized in a similar manner – into corps which contained infantry, cavalry and artillery (see Order of battle of the Waterloo Campaign), and used similar combined arms tactics. Within each corps were divisions of infantry or cavalry made up of brigades and an artillery unit. An army would usually also have reserves of all three arms under the direct command of the army commander which could be sent in support of any corps or division of a corps to increase any arm which the army general considered necessary. The great French cavalry charge commanded by Marshal Ney during the battle failed to break Wellington's squares of infantry and Ney's failure to supplement his cavalry with sufficient horse artillery to break the squares open is usually given as a major contributing factor in the failure. It is an example of why generals needed to use combined arms to overcome the tactics used by enemy officers to frustrate an attack by a single arm of an army.

In contrast the 27th (Inniskilling) suffered 478 casualties from an initial strength of 750 because of their exposure to attack by French combined arms. They were located near the centre of Wellington's line, but unlike most of the rest of Wellington's infantry were in a declivity on the exposed side of the Mont-Saint-Jean escarpment. Exposed as they were, they were forced to stand in square for most of the day for fear of cavalry attack and so made an easy dense target for Napoleon's massed artillery.

==== 20th-century developments ====
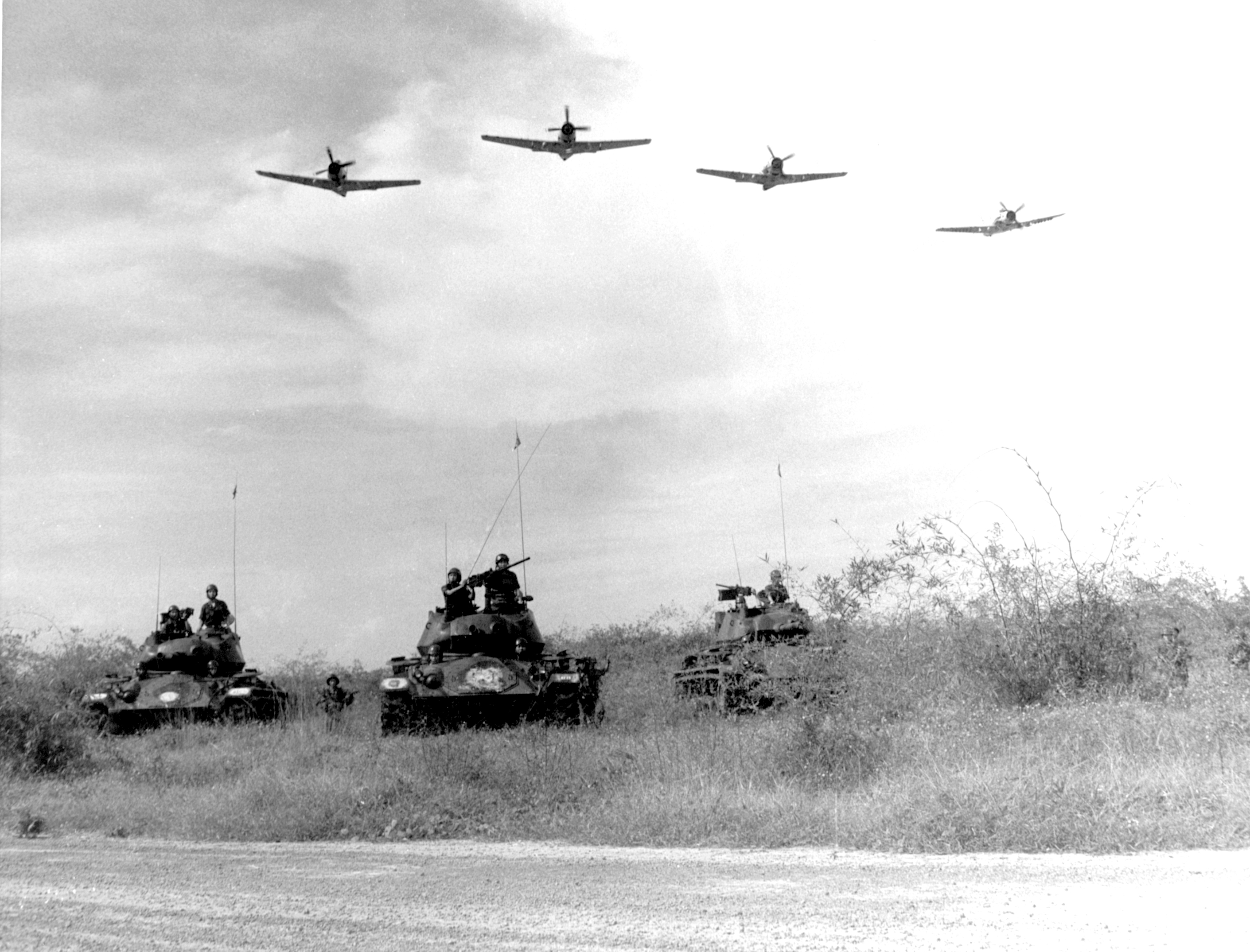
Vietnamese aircraft, infantry, and armored vehicles working together during training in 1963, Vietnam War

===== First World War =====
The development of modern combined arms tactics accelerated during the First World War. Early on the Western Front, fighting descended into stagnant trench warfare. Generals on both sides initially struggled to adapt existing doctrine to rapidly developing weapons and technologies. Attacks often relied on lengthy artillery bombardments followed by massed infantry assaults against well-entrenched positions, frequently resulting in heavy casualties for limited gains.

As the war progressed, combined arms tactics developed through repeated experimentation, often described in British usage as the "all-arms battle". These included closer artillery fire support for attacking troops, the creeping barrage, improved counter-battery fire, air support, and cooperation between tanks and infantry. Rather than appearing as a single invention, these methods evolved through the experience of successive battles as commanders learned to coordinate and synchronise different arms more effectively. The Battle of Cambrai in November 1917 was an important stage in this development, combining massed tanks with infantry, artillery, aircraft and cavalry. The initial attack achieved a substantial penetration of the German defensive system, but the British were unable to fully exploit their gains and a subsequent German counter-attack recovered much of the lost ground.

These methods were further refined during 1918. At the Battle of Hamel on 4 July, the Australian Corps under Lieutenant-General Sir John Monash, with attached American troops, conducted a carefully planned limited-objective attack integrating infantry, artillery, machine guns, tanks and aircraft. The operation made extensive use of surprise, coordinated artillery fire and close infantry–tank cooperation, while aircraft were also employed for reconnaissance and experimental ammunition resupply. Monash planned for the objectives to be taken in 90 minutes; they were secured in approximately 93. Although many of these techniques had been developed in earlier battles, Hamel represented a particularly successful integration of lessons accumulated by the British and Dominion armies and served as a springboard for subsequent operations.

The approach was employed on a much larger scale at the Battle of Amiens beginning on 8 August 1918. The offensive was planned by General Henry Rawlinson and General Marie-Eugène Debeney as a combined-arms battle based in part on the methods demonstrated at Hamel. The British Fourth Army coordinated the Australian Corps under Monash and the Canadian Corps under Arthur Currie, together with British and French formations, massed artillery, hundreds of tanks and extensive air support. Surprise, counter-battery fire, improved communications and detailed logistical planning were also important elements of the operation. Monash's performance as a commander in 1918 was later highly regarded by Bernard Montgomery, who wrote in his 1968 A History of Warfare, "I would name Sir John Monash as the best general on the western front in Europe."

Amiens opened the Hundred Days Offensive, during which Allied armies repeatedly adapted combinations of infantry, artillery, armour and aircraft to local circumstances. Combined arms did not depend upon tanks alone; tank strength declined rapidly even during the fighting at Amiens, while artillery, infantry, aircraft, communications and logistics remained central to later operations. The Hundred Days drove the German armies back from their defensive systems and culminated in the armistice with Germany; the other Central Powers concluded separate armistices during the closing weeks of the war.

===== Second World War =====
During the interwar period, several armies attempted to apply the lessons of the First World War to the problems of achieving and exploiting a breakthrough against modern defensive systems. By the Second World War, mechanisation, radio communications and increasingly effective air support allowed combined arms to be employed with greater mobility and at lower organisational levels, integrating infantry, armour, artillery, engineers, reconnaissance and other supporting arms into flexible formations.

Following Germany's defeat in 1918, General Hans von Seeckt directed a systematic study of the experience of the First World War within the Reichswehr. German officers examined tactical and operational lessons from the conflict and developed doctrine emphasising mobility, initiative, decentralised command and cooperation between arms. The resulting manual Führung und Gefecht der verbundenen Waffen ("Leadership and Battle with Combined Arms"), issued in 1921–23, helped establish the doctrinal foundation upon which later German mechanised warfare developed.

The highly mobile German operations of 1939–41 became popularly known as blitzkrieg. The term, however, did not describe a single formal German doctrine devised by one individual. German success depended upon a combination of existing traditions of mobile warfare with modern Panzer divisions, motorised infantry, artillery, engineers, reconnaissance, radio-enabled command and control, and cooperation with the Luftwaffe. Heinz Guderian was an important advocate of armoured and mechanised warfare, but was one of several officers involved in its development.

The Red Army developed a different but similarly influential approach during the interwar period. Soviet theorists including Mikhail Tukhachevsky, Vladimir Triandafillov, Alexander Svechin and Georgii Isserson developed the concepts of deep battle and deep operation, intended to attack an enemy simultaneously through the depth of its defensive system. Soviet doctrine envisaged infantry and artillery creating or widening penetrations while tanks and mechanised forces exploited them into the operational rear, supported by aviation. The concepts were incorporated into Soviet field regulations during the 1920s and 1930s, although their development was severely disrupted by the purges of the Red Army command. During the Second World War Soviet forces progressively rebuilt the organisation and experience necessary to conduct large-scale deep operations.

The Western Allies also developed their own combined-arms methods. In North Africa, the British Eighth Army under Bernard Montgomery increasingly coordinated infantry, engineers, artillery, armour and air support in carefully prepared all-arms operations. At the Second Battle of El Alamein in 1942, infantry and engineers attacked through extensive minefields under massed artillery support to open routes for armoured forces, while Allied aircraft attacked Axis positions and communications. The United States Army increasingly organised infantry, armour, artillery, engineers and other arms into flexible regimental combat teams and the combat commands of its armored divisions, allowing forces to be task-organised according to the mission. Improvements in artillery fire direction also enabled observers to rapidly concentrate the fire of multiple artillery units in support of ground forces.

The war also expanded the scale and complexity of cooperation between ground, air and naval forces. Close air support, airborne operations and amphibious operations required increasingly detailed coordination between different arms and military services. Large amphibious assaults, including operations in the Pacific and the Normandy landings in Europe, combined infantry, armour, engineers and artillery with naval gunfire, landing craft and air power. These operations overlapped with the broader concept of joint warfare, in which forces from more than one military service operate together.

===== Cold War =====
After the Second World War, the United States Marines Corps formalized the concept of the Marine Air-Ground Task Force, which combined Marine aviation and Marine ground units for expeditionary missions.

The Vietnam War had a profound influence on the development of the US Army's combined arms doctrine. Due to the very difficult terrain that prevented access to the enemy-held areas of operation, troops were often deployed by air assault. For this reason, US troops in Vietnam saw six times more combat than in preceding wars, due to less time spent on logistic delays. The result: an infantry unit increased in effectiveness by a factor of four for its size, when supported with helicopter-delivered ammunition, food and fuel. In time the US Army in Vietnam also learned to combine helicopter operations and airmobile infantry with the armoured and artillery units operating from fire support bases as well as the US brown-water navy and USAF close air support units supporting them.

AirLand Battle was the overall conceptual framework that formed the basis of the US Army's European warfighting doctrine from 1982 into the late 1990s. AirLand Battle emphasized close coordination between land forces acting as an aggressively maneuvering defense, and air forces attacking rear-echelon forces feeding those front line enemy forces.

In the 1991 Gulf War, General Schwarzkopf used a mix of strikes by fixed-wing aircraft including carpet bombing and precision bombing in combination with large numbers of strikes by attack helicopters. During the ground assault phase, tanks and other armoured fighting vehicles supported by attack aircraft swept over remaining forces. The front line moved forward at upwards of 40–50 km/h at the upper limit of the Army's tracked vehicles.

===== Post Cold War =====
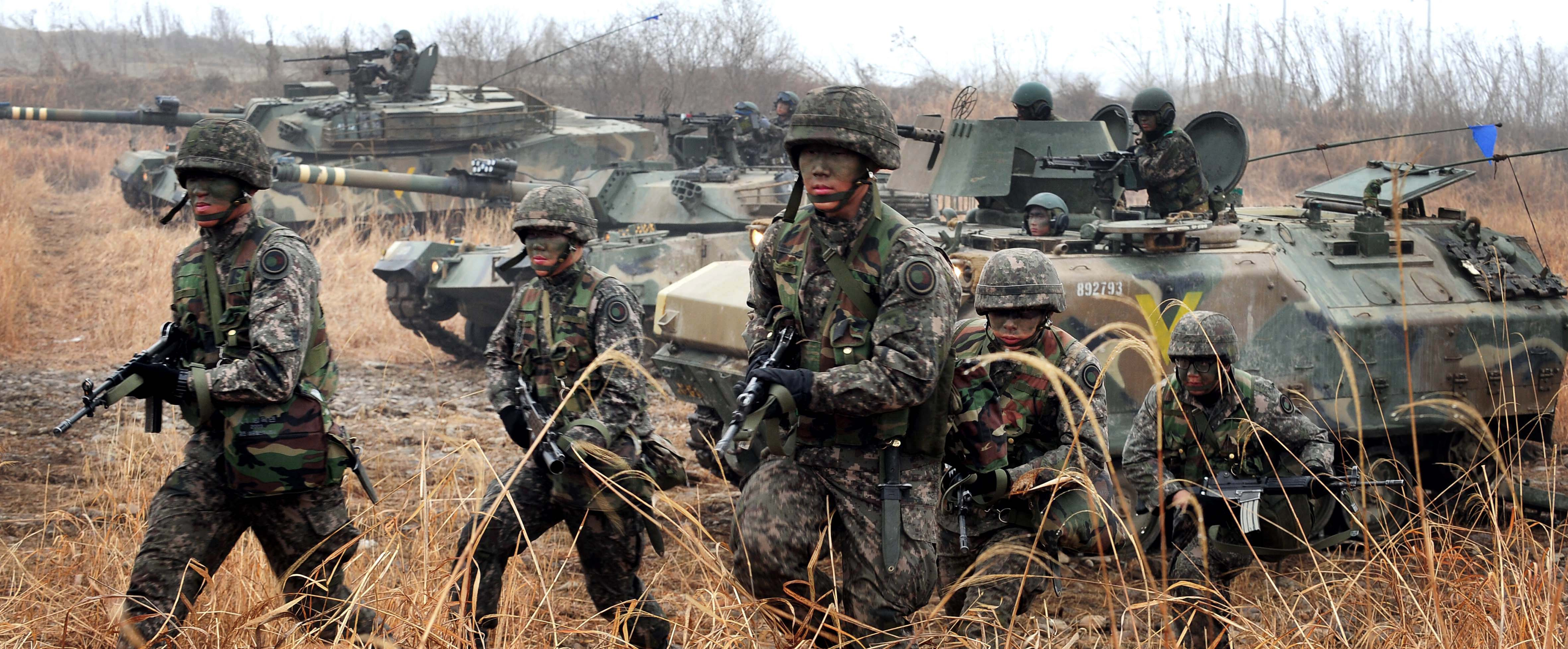
South Korean combat vehicles and infantry in Gyeonggi Province

In 2000, the US Army began developing a new set of doctrines intended to use information superiority to wage warfare. Six pieces of equipment were crucial for this: Boeing E-3 Sentry for Airborne early warning and control, Northrop Grumman E-8 Joint Surveillance Target Attack Radar System (for Airborne ground surveillance), GPS, VHF SINCGARS (for ground and airborne communications), and ruggedized computers. The mix is supplemented by satellite photos and passive reception of enemy radio emissions, forward observers with digital target designation, specialized scouting aircraft, anti-artillery radars and gun-laying software for artillery.

Based on this doctrine, many US ground vehicles moved across the landscape alone. If they encountered an enemy troop or vehicle concentration, they would assume a defensive posture, lay down as much covering fire as they could, designate the targets for requested air and artillery assets. Within a few minutes, on station aircraft would direct their missions to cover the ground vehicle. Within a half-hour heavy attack forces would concentrate to relieve the isolated vehicle. In an hour and a half the relieved vehicle would be resupplied.

==== 21st-century developments ====
In 2020, the Israel Defense Forces established the Multidimensional Unit, a dedicated combined arms battalion to test the viability of full integration of infantry, armor, and aircraft into a single battalion command structure. The unit fields Merkava Mk.4 main battle tanks, F-16D multirole fighters, Heron and Hermes 450 drones, and AH-64 Apache helicopters.

== See also ==
- Joint warfare
- Battlegroup (army)
- Organic unit
- Network-centric warfare
- Maneuver warfare
- Multi-Domain Operations
