= Strategy (Svechin book) =

1923 book by Alexander Svechin

- U.S. paperback edition, 2004
- Author: Alexander Andreyevich Svechin
- Subject: Military strategy
- Genre: Military studies
- Publisher: East View Information Services
- Publication date: 2004 [1923, 1927]
- Publication place: United States
- ISBN: 1-879944-33-2

Strategy is the title of the book by Soviet military officer and theoretician Alexander Svechin, first published in 1923, in which he expanded notions and views on the subject of strategy in warfare. It is considered a seminal classic by military historians, academics, and officers worldwide.

== Background ==
In the early 1920s, major general Alexander Svechin, professor of military science at the Military Academy, then directed by Defense Commissar Mikhail Frunze himself who held Svechin in high esteem, gave a series of lectures, titled "Integral Understanding of Military Art." (Note: As a Czarist officer in the Russian Army, Svechin had lectured on military tactics and strategy at the Nikolavesk Military Academy. Naveh (1997)) He contended that the division of the military art into strategy and tactics was "absurd" since the "general battle" that once served as the basis for the distinction no longer exists. Arguing that "strategy" and "tactics" are separated by the intermediate concept of "operational art," which organizes distinct tactical actions into operations, while the task of "grouping operations" for achieving the conflict's political objective falls on strategy, Svechin argued for the "internal integrity" of each part in which military art is divided.

The main corpus of these lectures was published in condensed and appropriately organized form as a book titled Strategy that was published in two editions, first in 1923 and then in 1927, in the Soviet Union.

== Contents ==
Svechin wrote clearly. Despite the clarity of his text, Svechin's approach and positions, were, at the time of the book's publication up until our time often and widely misunderstood.

=== Preface ===
Svechin, in the prefaces of the two editions, forewarns that the book shall “attack a large number of strategic prejudices”, since “a whole series of truths which were still valid in Moltke’s day” have become “outworn,” going on to assert that “new phenomena [in military reality]” compel him to even “make new definitions and establish new terminology.” Underlining the archetypal and without precedent nature of his work, he states that this “nature makes it impossible…to cite authorities to confirm [the] views” expressed therein, of which, moreover, he does not ask the reader’s acceptance “on blind faith”. His intention is not to write some “guidebook”, which, at best, he would consider useful as an “explanatory dictionary” of strategy, but to “broaden the reader’s view” rather than make him think in some particular direction. In sum, Svechin proclaims that “rules are inappropriate in strategy.”

=== Introduction ===
Svechin denotes the "art of war, in the broad sense," as encompassing all aspects of the military profession, including the study of weapons and warfare equipment, of military geography, of resource availability and evaluation, of social tendencies, of possible theaters of military operations, of military administration, and of the conduct itself of military operations. It cannot be divided, strictly speaking, by any clear boundaries into completely independent and delineated sections, although, for its study, it would be reasonable to divide the art of conducting military operations into several individual parts "on the condition that we do not ignore the close relationship between them and do not forget the arbitrary nature of this division."

Svechin can be considered a historicist. He points out that military history should be particularly pertinent to persons involved in the study of strategy, because, by its very methods, strategy is merely "a systematic contemplation of military history." A Clausewitzian historian, he asserts, after presenting a fact, proceeds to contemplate it (Betrachtung). A strategist will be successful if he correctly evaluates the nature of the war, which depends on various geographic, economic, administrative, technical, and social factors.

=== Strategy and Politics ===
For the author, strategy is an extension of politics, a principle completely unacceptable to German strategists such as Moltke or Ludendorff. (Note: Though, of course, as Svechin notes, Bismarck defended the right of politics to interfere in military strategy, while Buelow and Clausewitz fully endorsed the principle that military strategy is subordinate to politics. Svechin (2004) pp. 84-85.) For Svechin, war is only a part of a political conflict. Strategists should not complain about political interference in the leadership of military operations because strategy itself is a projection of politics. The claim that politics is superior to strategy is universal in nature, so it follows that unsound politics are inevitably followed by unsound strategy. On the joint work of politicians and military men, we should not specify some ideal form of organization of the political leadership of a war; we should look instead for "some specific, optimal compromise" in every particular instance.

"If you want peace, prepare for war", is the wisdom accepted by the author, who expands on the political goal of warfare, (Note: He stresses the need to differentiate between the causes of a war and its political aims. Svechin (2004) p.91.) since war is not an end in itself but is waged for the purpose of concluding a peace on certain terms. Pursuing a positive goal in war, and in politics, is more expensive in terms of resources and human forces than pursuing the maintenance of the status quo or for its partial maintenance, (Note: The maintenance of the status quo or its partial maintenance is denoted as a negative goal, though not in a dismissive sense.) provided the sides are stable enough and possess adequate defensive abilities. The author gives the Treaty of Versailles as a prime instigator of serious instability across Europe, precisely because the struggle to maintain the status quo proved to be by far the most costly choice: The whole of Central Europe, Germany, Poland, Czechoslovakia, and so forth, was placed in a situation that ruled out completely any possibility of defense and positional warfare. (Note: The Treaty of Versailles, per Svechin, expressed quite concretely Frances's centuries-old European policy. France, he claims, since the time of Cardinal Richelieu, has aimed at the creation of conditions of fragmentation, weaknesses, and open fields in the continent.) Svechin, writing in the 1920s, goes on to predict the operational outbreak of the next world war. (Note: "The idea behind Versailles, putting Germany in an indefensible position, has made it physically necessary for Germany to prepare for offensive operations [in the future]. Poland will have the opportunity to ponder how it should thank France for the gift of the Polish Corridor, which has put Poland first in line for a German attack." Svechin (2004) p.251, being ironical.)

The central importance of politics in the realm of military strategy promoted by Svechin is reflected in Marxist theoretician Antonio Gramsci's emphasis on politics per se as a vital, though largely neglected, aspect of the ideological struggle. Strategy "should be the projection of the general political line of conduct on a military front," argued Svechin. (Note: Mikhail Tukhachevsky made a similar point, urging the following: "We should outline the basic lines of strategic thinking, the main paths of strategic direction which we must follow in our era - an era in which we shall have to stand up for the gains of the October Revolution." Egan (2018) p.81) For Gramsci, the concept of the "operation" allows us the bridge the "insurmountable gap" between strategy and tactics at the higher levels of the political struggle, and should inform the actions of the left organizations that pursue the radical transformation of the prevalent social formation.

=== Preparing the Armed Front ===
Svechin examines in depth the "initial principles" of preparation and militarizion, (Note: "The plan of preparing a state for war is a plan for militarizing the state." Svechin (2004) p.170.) of the use of intelligence, and, most extensively, the preparation of the armed front: The building of armed forces, the military & general mobilization, the preparation of operating theatres, and the formulation of operation plans.

=== Combining Operations ===
Strategic thinking begins when one, in the course of a military operations, begins to see beyond the "chaotic jumble of events," to see a certain path towards achieving the war's objectives. The overall direction of the war effort at any time is the responsibility of the political leadership through "attentive discussions with the strategists" of the military leadership, a direction that, in general must be oriented towards destruction of the enemy or attrition. Svechin offers attrition and destruction as two approaches in operations, either one of which might be superior to and preferable from the other depending on the "concrete circumstances" of the moment. He did not actually advocate at all the supremacy of one strategy over the other. In its essence, Strategy firmly and insistently advocates the need to be at all times sensitive to "concrete reality."

Nonetheless, a central point of misunderstanding the contents of the book was precisely the presumed preference of the author for a strategy of attrition over a strategy of destruction, or annihilation, of the enemy. David R. Stone, professor of military history at Kansas State University, remarks that "the breadth of Svechin's thinking has often been shoe-horned into narrow appraisals centering around limited and schematic questions." Stone points out the example of Condoleezza Rice, who, in her capacity as Stanford University professor of political science, was writing, as late as near the end of the 20th century, that Svechin, in his book, was convinced of "the fallacy of operations in depth to achieve decisive victory" and was claiming "the next war would be [one] of attrition." Stone remarks that, in support of this assertion, Rice only cited Strategy in toto, without specific references to the book's text.

=== Command ===
On strategic leadership, Svechin emphasizes the need to both give shape to a general staff composed of specialists who are capable of coordinating and harmonizing extensive, diverse, and multi-directional preparations and eliminate the gap between the general staff and line officers. The orienting and goal-setting work of headquarters should naturally proceed at a calm pace. This work would be based also on intelligence, as aspect so important that the most talented member of the leadership must be placed in its charge. He dismisses the notions prevalent in 18th century military education, yet still alive until almost WWI, whereby hesitation was practically not permitted among military men.

The notion of initiative itself has led to errors grave and small. Having the initiative does not necessarily mean being on the offensive, yet the perspective of many leaders is distorted by the "mirage of destroying the enemy." True initiative may involve compelling the enemy to attack in conditions that are unfavorable to him. In fact, not every movement forward can be automatically assessed as a strategic offensive.

The author deals extensively with the discharge of the high command's strategic duties during the war. While the high command cannot remain "slavishly subordinate to the tactical reality unfolding on the battlefield," there are times when its intervention in operational and tactical details is "absolutely necessary," citing examples from the Prussian army's conduit in 1870 where friction and misunderstanding amongst neighboring armies within a very narrow front had to be avoided through very specific instructions.

== Reception ==
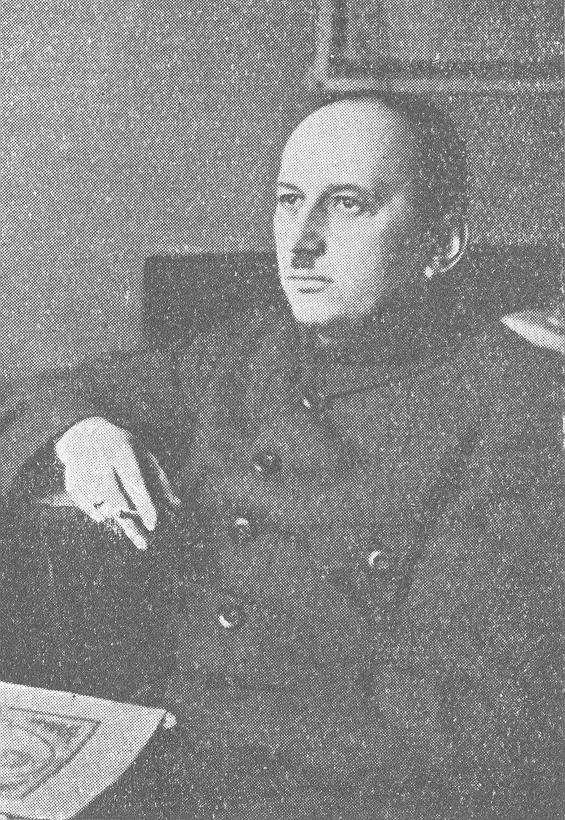
Svechin, ca. 1923

Initially received with praise in the military and political circles of the USSR, and acquiring a prominent place in the military schools' curriculum, Svechin's work encountered severe polemics after Frunze's death in October 1925, with detractors denouncing its themes, as well as the author's alleged intentions. Svechin was not a Marxist, nor a member of the Communist Party. Moreover, his evolutionary approach to the historical development of military strategy was at odds with "dialectic" analysis, at least as this was defined by the dominant nomenclature of the time, although modern analysts describe his approach as a "combination of Hegelian dialectics with historical materialism." Nonetheless, it is clear that Svechin's approach shares Marx's materialism, in arguing that "actual, material conditions are fundamental to human behavior and human institutions."

During the purges of 1937-38, Joseph Stalin liquidated most Soviet military theoreticians and a significant number of the armed forces high command. Among the officers who fell victim to the purge, most eminent was Marshal Mikhail Tukhachevsky. (Note: Historians note the irony of Tukhachevsky preceding Svechin in front of the firing squad, when the former had consistently attacked the latter for military and ideological sins, e.g. of missing "key elements of Marxist thinking." Stone (2012) pp. 684-88.) Almost all the officers who maintained professional contacts in their career with the German military became suspect for possible future collaboration with the enemy or outright treason in case of a war with Germany. (Note: Following the 1922 Treaty of Rapallo between the Soviet Union and Germany, under which both renounced all territorial and financial claims against each other, the relations between the two countries underwent a period of close co-operation and increased commerce in many fields. There were frequent exchange visits of officers and meetings in which ideas were presented and discussed. See Germany–Soviet Union relations, 1918–1941.)

Svechin was arrested on 30 December 1937 and charged with "participating in a counter-revolutionary organization" and "training terrorists". Stalin was, on the basis of political ideology, a strong supporter of "offensive warfare" and disliked the notions in Strategy, as they were understood by the regime, on defense, attrition, and planning. In that vein, Stalin understood the assessments of the Soviet Union's "geographical advantages" by the Strategy author as defeatist and advocating strictly a "defense in depth." (Note: After the Germans attacked in 1941, and the Red Army retreated as far back as Moscow, the Soviet defense-in-depth became necessarily the reality of the war at that phase.)

Svechin's name was included in death list No. 107, dated 26 July 1938 and signed by Stalin and Vyacheslav Molotov. On 29 July 1938, he was sentenced to death by the Military Collegium of the Supreme Court of the Soviet Union and executed on 29 August 1938. His body was buried in the Moscow firing range of Butovo.

He was rehabilitated within the framework of Mikhail Gorbachev's policy of glasnost. In 2013, Russian General Staff Chief Army General Valery Gerasimov publicly praised Svechin's contribution to military theory.

== Legacy ==
Until the 1960s, Svechin's Strategy was the only work that systematically analyzed strategy in wars that had occurred until and during the first quarter of the 20th century.

The notions of positional warfare advanced in the book are considered still fully relevant in modern, conventional, military conflicts, particularly those described by using terms like "stalemate" and "attritional", such as, prominently, the war in Ukraine that commenced with the 2022 Russian invasion. Svechin’s arguments add nuance and depth to the concept of positional warfare, particularly for contemporary Western military thinkers.
