= Dmitri Varfolomeyev =

Dmitri Varfolomeyev may refer to:

- Dmitri Varfolomeyev (footballer, born 1978), Russian football player
- Dmitri Varfolomeyev (footballer, born 1993), Russian football player
