= Nikolai Varfolomeev =

Soviet Military Theorist (c. 1890–1939)

Nikolai Efimovich Varfolomeev
- Николай Ефимович Варфоломеев
- Born: September 29, 1890; Saratov, Russian Empire
- Died: May 8, 1939 (aged 48); Moscow, Soviet Union
- Burial place: Donskoye Cemetery, Moscow
- Military career
- Allegiance: Russian Empire (1910–March 1918); Russian SFSR (1918–1922); Soviet Union (1922–1939)
- Branch: Russian Empire, Imperial Russian Army (1910–March 1918); Soviet Union, Red Army (March 1918–1939)
- Service years: 1910–1939
- Rank: Kombrig (Brigade Commander)
- Units: 7th Artillery Brigade; 11th Heavy Artillery Brigade; 7th Rifle Division; 16th Army; Western Front
- Commands: Chief of Staff, Volga Military District (Jun 1937–Mar 1938)
- Conflicts: World War I, Russian Civil War, Winter War
- Awards: Order of St. Anna 4th class with swords, "For Bravery" (1915); Order of St. Anna 3rd class with swords and bow (1915); Order of Saint Stanislaus (House of Romanov) 3rd class with swords and bow (1915); Order of Saint Stanislaus (House of Romanov) 2nd class with swords (1916); Order of St. Anna 2nd class with swords (1916); Order of St. Vladimir 4th class with swords and bow (1917)

Nikolai Efimovich Varfolomeev (Russian: Николай Ефимович Варфоломеев; 29 September 1890 – 8 May 1939) was a Soviet military commander and theoretician. He and Vladimir Triandafillov made significant contributions to the use of technology in deep offensive operations. Varfolomeev was one of the foremost military theorists teaching at the RKKA Military Academy. He was executed in 1939 during the Great Purge.

== Military career ==
Varfolomeev was a graduate of the last class, in 1918, of the General Staff Academy. He obtained the rank of a Captain

. He joined the Red Army in March 1918 voluntarily and was involved in defining the new borders between Soviet Russia and Germany. By June 1922 he was Deputy Commander of the armies on the Western Front reporting to Mikhail Tukhachevsky. In 1925 he was appointed as deputy to Tukhachevsky in his role as head of strategic training for all Red Army officers. This was likely to be at Frunze Military Academy where he was awarded the title of Professor. Here he published as a joint effort with Tukhachevsky and Shilovkii "The Army Operation. The Work of the Command and Field Directorate, in 1926". In 19933 he published his book, The Shock Army, which was a review of the German Offensive in 1918 on the Western Front and the subsequent Allied Counter Offensive. While it touched on deep operations it was primarily focused on the role of the "Shock Army" which was to deliver the "deep and shattering blow"

== Deep operation ==
Varfolomeev, unlike Triandafilov, was less concerned with developing the quantitative indices of deep battle, but rather the mechanics of the shock army's mission. Varfolomeev termed this as "launching an uninterrupted, deep and shattering blow" along the main axis of advance. Varfolomeev believed the shock army needed both firepower and mobility to destroy both enemy tactical defences, operational reserves and seize geographical targets or positions in harmony with other operationally independent, but strategically collaborative, offensives.

== Death ==
He was arrested on March 3, 1938 as part of the Great Purge between of 1936 and 1938. He was convicted by Military Collegium of the Supreme Court of the USSR on the charges of "participation in a counterrevolutionary officer organization and an anti-Soviet military-fascist conspiracy" He was sentenced to death on March 19, 1939 and was executed on May 8, 1939. He is buried in Donskoye Cemetery, Grave 1, a mass grave, with 4259 other named victims.

On April 11, 1956, by the decision of the Military Collegium of the Supreme Court of the USSR, he was rehabilitated.

== Awards ==
Order of Saint Vladimir, 4th class with swords and bow (1917)
Order of Saint Stanislaus,2nd class with swords (1916)
Order of Saint Stanislaus, 3rd class with swords and bow (1915)
Order of Saint Anna, 2nd class with swords (1916)
Order of Saint Anna, 3rd class with swords and bow (1915)
Order of Saint Anna, 4th Class with swords, with the inscription "For Bravery" (1915)

== Published Work ==
- Варфоломеев, Н. Е. (1933). Ударная армия. 1918 г. на Западном фронте мировой империалистической войны: Германское наступление (21 марта — 4 августа) (in Russian). Москва: Госвоениздат. p. 203.
- Варфоломеев, Н. Е. (1925). Оперативные документы войсковых штабов (in Russian) (2-е изд., испр. и доп. ed.). Москва: Гос. воен. изд-во. p. 111.
- Варфоломеев, Н. Е.; Верховской, Б. (1927). Работа войсковых штабов (in Russian). Москва; Ленинград: Гос. изд-во, Отдел военных дел.
- Варфоломеев, Н. Е. (1925). Тактика польской армии (in Russian). Москва: (Moscow).
- Варфоломеев, Н. Е. (1930). [Военная операция около г. Мозырь в 1920 г.] (in Russian). Москва: (Moscow).
- Varfolomeev, N. (1928). Tekhnika shtabnoĭ sluzhby : operativnai︠a︡ sluzhba voĭskovykh shtabov v voennoe vremi︠a︡. Vysshiĭ voen. (Техника штабной службы: оперативная служба войсковых штабов в военное время)
- Varfolomeev, N. (1929). Rabota voĭskovykh shtabov. (Работа войсковых штабов)
- Varfolomeev, N. (1931). Boevye deĭstvii︠a︡ strelkovogo korpusa. (Боевые действия стрелкового корпуса)
- Varfolomeev, N. (1932). Mozyrskai︠a︡ operat︠s︡ii︠a︡ vesnoĭ 1920 goda. (Мозырская операция весной 1920 года)

== Bibliography ==
- Brigade Commander Georgii Samoilovich Isserson. The Evolution of Operational Art. Translator: Bruce W. Menning. Combat Studies Institute Press. ISBN 978-0-9891372-3-2.
- Harrison, Richard W. The Russian Way of War: Operational Art 1904–1940. Lawrence, Kan.: University Press of Kansas, 2001. ISBN 0-7006-1074-X
