= Dmitri Varfolomeyev (footballer, born 1993) =

Russian footballer

Personal information
- Full name: Dmitri Ivanovich Varfolomeyev
- Date of birth: 12 June 1993 (age 33)
- Height: 1.69 m (5 ft 6 1/2 in)
- Position: Midfielder

Youth career
- Nizhny Novgorod Academy

Senior career*
Years	Team	Apps	(Gls)
2010	FC NIK-1 Nizhny Novgorod		
2011–2012	FC Nizhny Novgorod	6	(0)
2012–2013	FC Volga Nizhny Novgorod	0	(0)
2013	FC Shakhtyor Peshelan		
2013	FC Khimik-Tosol-Sintez Dzerzhinsk		
2014–2015	FC Sarov		
- * Club domestic league appearances and goals

Dmitri Ivanovich Varfolomeyev (Russian: Дмитрий Иванович Варфоломеев; born 12 June 1993) is a former Russian professional football player.

== Club career ==
He made his Russian Football National League debut for FC Nizhny Novgorod on 5 April 2012 in a game against FC Ural Yekaterinburg.
