= Dmitri Varfolomeyev (footballer, born 1978) =

Russian footballer

Personal information
- Full name: Dmitri Nikolayevich Varfolomeyev
- Date of birth: 15 March 1978 (age 48)
- Place of birth: Leningrad, Russian SFSR
- Height: 1.78 m (5 ft 10 in)
- Position: Midfielder

Youth career
- Smena St. Petersburg

Senior career*
Years	Team	Apps	(Gls)
1996	FC Saturn Ramenskoye	11	(0)
1997	FC Dynamo St. Petersburg	24	(4)
1998–2000	FC Saturn Ramenskoye	31	(2)
1999–2000	→ FC Saturn-d Ramenskoye (loans)	18	(1)
2001	FC Zhenis Astana	27	(0)
2002–2003	FC Kristall Smolensk	18	(1)
2003–2005	FC Vityaz Podolsk	45	(0)
2009	DYuSSh Vityaz-Avtomig Podolsk		
2010	FC Kolomyagi-47 St. Petersburg		

International career
1999	Russia U-21	2	(0)
- * Club domestic league appearances and goals

Dmitri Nikolayevich Varfolomeyev (Russian: Дмитрий Николаевич Варфоломеев; born 15 March 1978) is a Russian former football player.

He is a younger brother of Sergei Varfolomeyev.

== Honours ==
Zhenis Astana

- Kazakhstan Premier League champion: 2001
- Kazakhstan Cup winner: 2001
