= Military Thought =

- Editor: Sergey Rodikov
- Categories: Scientific military journal Awarded the Order of the Red Star
- Frequency: Monthly
- Format: 96 lanes
- Publisher: Red Star
- Total circulation: 1580 (2018)
- Founder: Ministry of Defense of the Soviet Union; Ministry of Defense of the Russian Federation
- Founded: 1918 "Military Science and Revolution": 1921–1922; "Military Thought and Revolution": 1922–1924; "War and Revolution": 1925–1936; "Military Thought": 1937–present;
- Country: (Soviet Union) (Russia)
- Based in: Postal, Khoroshevskoe Highway, Building No. 86, Building No. 1, Moscow, 123007
- Language: Russian
- Website: http://vm.milportal.ru
- ISSN: 0236-2058

Military Thought is a military-theoretical journal of the Ministry of Defense of the Soviet Union and the Ministry of Defense of the Russian Federation.

== History of the magazine ==
In 1858, at the suggestion of Dmitry Milyutin, a professor at the Imperial Military Academy, a magazine was founded under the title "Military Collection". The content of the journal was devoted to the study of problems of military policy, military art and other aspects of military affairs.

After the October Revolution, on June 1, 1918, a journal with similar content began to be published in the Soviet republic under the title "Military Affairs". In the period until 1937, the magazine repeatedly changed its name to "Military Science and Revolution" (1921–1922), "Military Thought and Revolution" (1922–1924) and "War and Revolution" (1925–1936). On January 1, 1937, the name "Military Thought" was fixed and is still preserved.

In the period 1941–1959, the Military History Journal was included in the Military Thought magazine.

In 1975, by the Decree of the Presidium of the Supreme Soviet of the Soviet Union for the contribution to the information support of the development of domestic military science, the construction and use of the Armed Forces, the Military Thought magazine was awarded the Order of the Red Star.

Since July 1, 1994, it is published once every two months.

Since 1989, the magazine has been open for subscription to the general reader.

At the moment, the publication is monthly.

== Audience and content of the magazine ==
From the first days of its creation, the magazine was intended for generals, admirals and officers of the Armed Forces of the Soviet Union, and now the Armed Forces of the Russian Federation.

At the present stage, the journal reveals the following questions:

- The development of the military doctrine of the Russian Federation, the concept of its security and defense, taking into account the changing military-political situation;
- Tasks of military construction of the state, training of the armed forces, problems of scientific and technological progress in military affairs;
- Analysis of the processes taking place in the armed forces.

The journal serves the following tasks:

- Promoting the development of military science, improving the military knowledge of regular military personnel;
- Promoting the implementation of scientific recommendations and best practices in the work of commanders, chiefs and staffs;
- Analysis and generalization of the development of strategy, operational art, tactics during the war and armed conflicts;
- Propaganda of the results of military scientific research;
- Coverage of the achievements of military thought in other countries.

The journal also highlights the theory of construction and training of foreign armies and their development trends.

The authors of articles in the journal were and are the leading members of the Ministry of Defense of the Russian Federation, the General Staff, military districts, groups of forces and fleets, generals, admirals and officers of the armed forces and combat arms, scientists from military academies and research institutions.

== Evaluation of the magazine ==
During the years of the Cold War, the intelligence of Western countries attached great importance to the content of the issues of Military Thought. A large number of issues of the magazine were transferred by Oleg Penkovsky to agents of the Central Intelligence Agency in the 1960s. According to Western military analysts, the content of Military Thought magazine was the key to understanding the strategy of the Soviet Union and the Warsaw Pact countries. Through the magazine, Western intelligence inquired about the development of Soviet military science, military reforms in the Soviet Union, Soviet tactics of modern combat and the strategy of warfare.

In view of the value of the information contained in the magazine, beginning in 1962, by order of the deputy director of the Central Intelligence Directorate Richard Helms, the study of the issues of Military Thought was declared secret and the circle of officials was limited to access to its translation.

The privacy stamp for translations of some publications from the magazine was removed in 2012.

At the present stage, the Defense Intelligence Agency of the United States Department of Defense, in reports on the state of the Armed Forces of the Russian Federation, also refers to publications in Military Thought.
