= Operational level of war =

Between strategic and tactical warfare

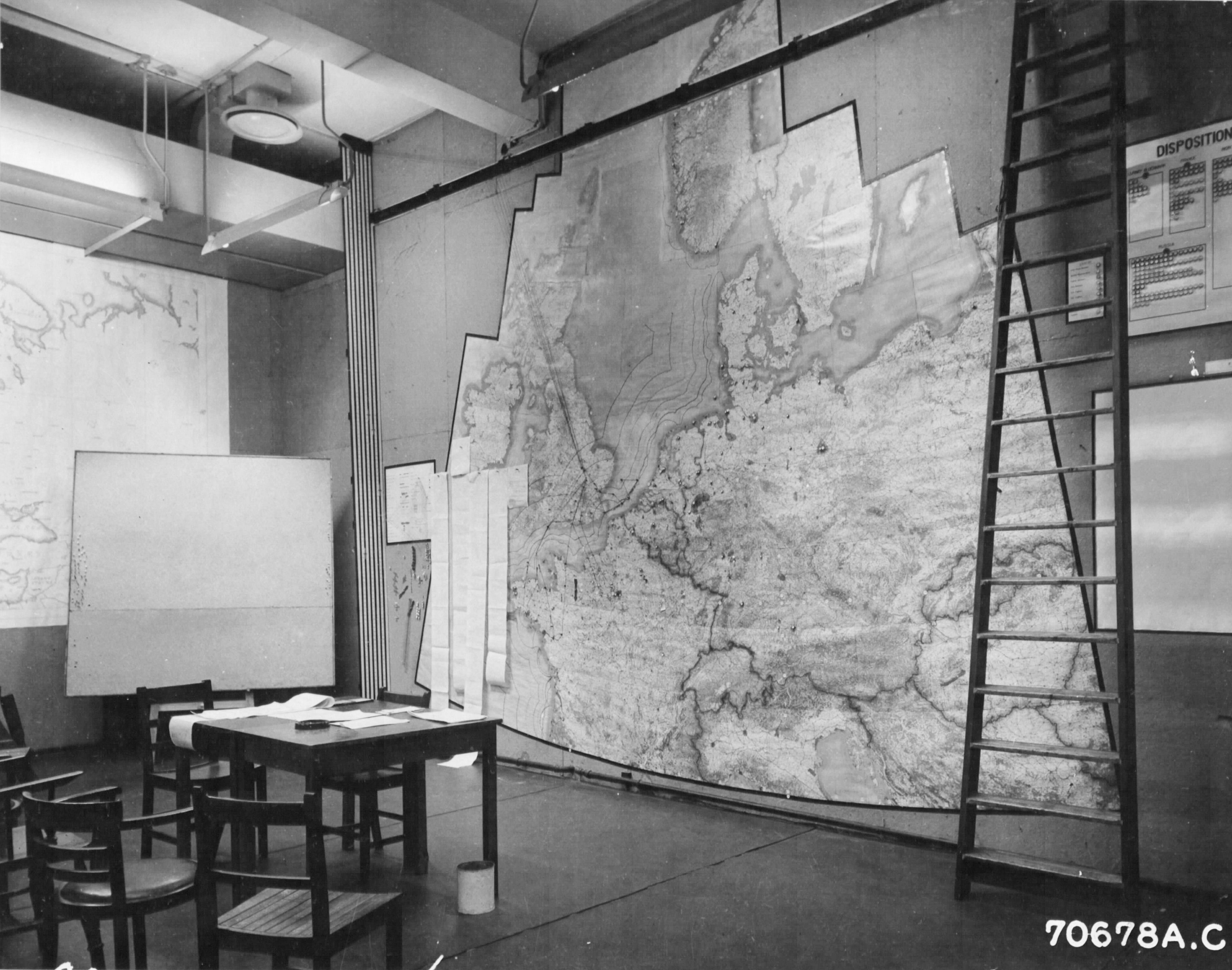
World War II operational planning map in the 1st Air Division (part of Eighth Air Force) war room at Brampton Grange

In the field of military theory, the operational level of war (also called operational art, as derived from Russian: оперативное искусство, or operational warfare) represents the level of command that connects the details of tactics with the goals of strategy. In other words, it involves creating, through successful tactics in the theater of military operations, the conditions needed for strategic success.

In U.S. Joint military doctrine, operational art is "the cognitive approach by commanders and staffs—supported by their skill, knowledge, experience, creativity, and judgment—to develop strategies, campaigns, and operations to organize and employ military forces by integrating ends, ways, and means". It correlates political requirements with military power. Operational art is defined by its military-political scope, not by force size, scale of operations or degree of effort. Likewise, operational art provides theory and skills, and the operational level permits doctrinal structure and process.

The operational level of war is concerned with four essential elements: time, space, means, and purpose. Through means such as directing troops and allocating (limited) resources (among others), operational art aims to achieve political goals by producing an optimal (or at least near-optimal) generation and application of military power. For example, proposals may be generated to identify where to build defensive structures, how many, what kind, and manned by how many troops; a proposal may be accepted, or reworked. During the 20th century, the nascent field of operations research flourished as a result of military efforts to improve logistics and decision-making.

The operational level of war sits between tactics (which consists of organizing and employing fighting forces on or near the battlefield) and strategy (which involves aspects of long-term and high-level theatre operations, and government leadership).

The Soviet Union was the first country to officially distinguish this third level of military thinking, which was introduced as part of the deep operation military theory that Soviet armed forces developed during the 1920s and 1930s and utilized during the Second World War.

== Background ==
During the 18th and early 19th centuries, the synonymous term grand tactics (or, less frequently, maneuver tactics) was often used to describe the manoeuvres of troops not tactically engaged. Subsequently, starting in the late 19th century and continuing throughout World War I and World War II, the term minor strategy was used by some military commentators. Confusion over terminology was exposed in professional military publications, that sought to identify "...slightly different shades of meaning, such as tactics, major tactics, minor tactics, grand strategy, major strategy, and minor strategy". The term operational art was not widely used in the United States or Britain before 1980–1981, when it became much discussed and started to enter military doctrines and officer combat training courses.

== Application ==
Operational art comprises four essential elements: time, space, means and purpose. Each element is found in greater complexity at the operational level than at the tactical or strategic level. This is true partly because operational art must consider and incorporate more of the strategic and tactical levels than those levels must absorb from the operational level. Although much can be gained by examining the four elements independently, it is only when they are viewed together that operational art reveals its intricate fabric.

The challenge of operational art is to establish a four-element equilibrium that permits the optimal generation and application of military power in achieving the political goal. Viewing time, space, means and purpose as a whole requires great skill in organizing, weighing and envisioning masses of complex, often contradictory factors. These factors often exist for extended periods, over great distances and with shifting mixes of players, systems and beliefs, pursuing political goals which may or may not be clear, cogent or settled. Compounding factors, such as the opponent's actions, create further ambiguity.

=== Mission analysis ===
The operational-level strategist possesses numerous tools to frame and guide their thinking, but chief among these are mission analysis and end state. Mission analysis answers the question "What is to be accomplished?" Through mission analysis, the operational-level planner fuses political aims with military objectives. In so doing, the planner determines what application of military force will create military power to achieve the political purpose. Subordinate processes here include defining objectives and centers of gravity, but excessive dependence on analytical mechanisms can create false security. The final test rewards success, not the quality of the argument. Conversely, the planner cannot hope to "feel" a way to victory—complexity demands an integration of thought and effort.

=== End state ===
End state answers the question "What will constitute success?" The campaign end state is not merely a desired status quo of the military goal. It also establishes a touchstone for the tactical, operational and strategic levels. The end state manifests the intended results of military power and exposes any limitations. Indeed, an achievable end state may require the employment of nonmilitary elements of national power. As such, it recognizes that military power alone may not be capable of attaining political success.

== Skills required ==
An operational-level strategy must continually identify and weigh time, space, means and purpose, extrapolating from them outcomes and likelihood. To accomplish this, practitioners need both skill and theory, experience and knowledge. At the operational level, skills and experience must usually be developed indirectly, through formal training, military history and real-world practice.

Success at the tactical level is no guarantee of success at the operational level since mastery of operational art demands strategic skills but not vice versa. Without a strong grounding in the theory and application of operational art, a successful tactician has little hope of making the demanding leap from tactics. The operational level strategist must see clearly and expansively from the foxhole into the corridors of national or coalition authority. They must be aware of the plausibility and coherence of strategic aims, national will and the players who decide them. Successful operational art charts a clear, unbroken path from the individual soldier's efforts to the state or coalition's goals.

== Role in historiography ==
While the emerging corpus of operational art and the establishment of a specifically operational level of war are relatively new, in practice operational art has existed throughout recorded history. Peoples and commanders have long pursued political goals through military actions, and one can examine campaigns of any period from the existential perspective of operational art. Current schools of thought on the operational art share the fundamental view that military success can be measured only in the attainment of political-strategic aims, and thus historians can analyze any war in terms of operational art.

In the case of World War II analysis, the Wehrmacht did not use the operational level as a formal doctrinal concept during the campaigns of 1939–1945. While personnel within the German forces knew of operational art, awareness and practice was limited principally to general-staff trained officers. Nevertheless, the existential nature of operational art means that examining a campaign or an operation against political aims is valid irrespective of the doctrine or structures of the period. Thus the elements of operational art—time, space, means and purpose—can illuminate thoughts and actions of any era, regardless of the prevailing contemporary doctrine or structure.

== See also ==
- Grand strategy
- Maskirovka
- Military doctrine
- Military strategy
- Military tactics
- Naval strategy
- Principles of war
- Strategy
