= Sergei Varfolomeyev =

Russian footballer

Personal information
- Full name: Sergei Nikolayevich Varfolomeyev
- Date of birth: 27 February 1968 (age 58)
- Place of birth: Leningrad, Russian SFSR
- Height: 1.71 m (5 ft 7 1/2 in)
- Positions: Forward; midfielder

Youth career
- Smena Leningrad

Senior career*
Years	Team	Apps	(Gls)
1986–1990	FC Dynamo Leningrad	115	(25)
1990–1994	FC Zenit Saint Petersburg	148	(25)
1995–1999	FC Saturn Ramenskoye	126	(20)
1999	FC Kristall Smolensk	7	(0)
2000	Dinaburg FC	7	(0)
2000	FC Dynamo-Stroyimpuls St. Petersburg (amateur)		
2001–2002	FC Kondopoga		
2002	FC PetroLesSport Saint Petersburg		
2003	FC Kondopoga		
- * Club domestic league appearances and goals

Sergei Nikolayevich Varfolomeyev (Russian: Сергей Николаевич Варфоломеев; born 27 February 1968 in Leningrad) is a former Russian football player.

He is the older brother of Dmitri Varfolomeyev.
