= Ludendorff =

Ludendorff is a surname. Notable persons with that name include:

- Erich Ludendorff (1865–1937), German general
- Hans Ludendorff (1873–1941), German astronomer
- Mathilde Ludendorff (1877–1966), German teacher and psychiatrist

== See also ==
- Ludendorff Bridge, a former railway bridge across the Rhine in Germany, named after Erich Ludendorff
- Ludendorff, a fictional town in the video game Grand Theft Auto V that is based on Fargo, North Dakota; see Fargo, North Dakota#In popular culture
- Ludendorff, the former German name of the Prussian village Kruszewnia, now in Poland
