= Vladimir Triandafillov =

Soviet military commander and theoretician (1894–1931)

- Владимир Кириакович Триандафиллов
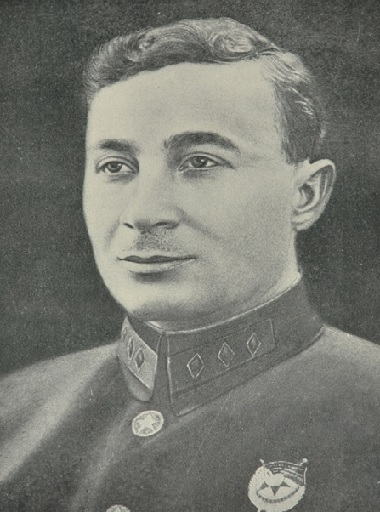
- Born: 14 March 1894; Kars, Russian Empire (today Turkey)
- Died: 12 July 1931 (aged 37); Moscow, Russian SFSR, Soviet Union
- Burial place: Kremlin Wall Necropolis
- Military career
- Allegiance: Russian Empire (1914–1917); Soviet Union (1917–1931)
- Service years: 1914–1931
- Rank: General
- Commands: Red Army
- Conflicts: World War I Russian Civil War
- Awards: Order of the Red Banner

Vladimir Kiriakovitch Triandafillov (Russian: Владимир Кириакович Триандафиллов; 14 March 1894 – 12 July 1931) was a Soviet military commander and theoretician considered by many to be the "father of Soviet operational art".

== Biography ==
He was born on 14 March 1894 in Magaradzhik village in Kars Oblast, then in the Russian Empire (today in Ataköy, Kars, Turkey) of Pontic Greek parents. The family name derives from triantáfyllo, τριαντάφυλλο, Modern Greek for the rose flower. His family had moved to Russia. After graduating from the Transcaucasian teachers' seminar in 1914, he was drafted into Russian Imperial Army and sent as a private to the Russian Southwestern Front of World War I. Graduating from the Moscow Praporshchik School in 1915, he continued serving in the army, earning the rank of captain. During the Russian Civil War, he rose in rank up to brigade commander while fighting on various fronts. He became a member of the Russian Communist Party (b) in 1919.

In 1923, he was appointed chief of the Operations Directions of the Soviet General Staff and Deputy Chief of the General Staff.

Vladimir Triandafillov was the author of two fundamental military doctrine works: Scale of the Operations of Modern Armies, published in 1926 and Characteristics of the Operations of the Modern Armies, published in 1929. In these two works, he elaborated his deep operation theory about the future warfare. The objective of a "deep operation" was to attack the enemy simultaneously throughout the depth of his ground force to induce a catastrophic failure in his defensive system. Highly mobile formations would then exploit this failure by breaking into the deep rear of the enemy and destroying his ability to rebuild his defenses.

Vladimir Triandafillov was killed in an aircraft crash on 12 July 1931 and his ashes were buried in the Kremlin Wall Necropolis. The quality of his work was realised late during World War II, when Georgy Zhukov said that his success was due to closely following Triandafillov's deep operations doctrine.

Military offices
Preceded by Boris Shaposhnikov	Chief of the Staff of the Red Army; May 1931 – 12 July 1931	Succeeded by Alexander Yegorov
