= Alexander Svechin =

Russian and Soviet general (1878–1938)

- Александр Андреевич Свечин
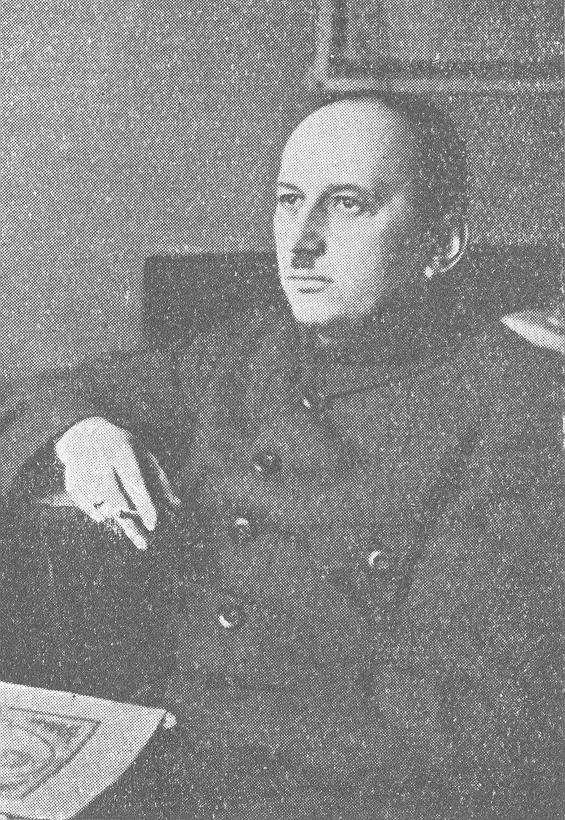
- Svechin, c. 1923
- Born: Alexander Andreyevich Svechin; 17 August 1878; Odessa, Kherson Governorate, Russian Empire
- Died: 28 July 1938 (aged 59); Moscow, Russian SFSR, Soviet Union
- Education: Academy of General Staff of the Red Army
- Military career
- Allegiance: Russian Empire; Russian SFSR; Soviet Union
- Branch: Russian Imperial Army; Red Army
- Service years: 1899–1938
- Conflicts: Russo-Japanese War; World War I Russian Civil War; Soviet–Japanese Border Wars

Alexander Andreyevich Svechin (Russian: Александр Андреевич Свечин; 17 August 1878 – 28 July 1938) was a Russian and Soviet military leader, military writer, educator, and theorist, and author of the military classic work Strategy.

== Early life ==
He was born in Odessa, where his father was a general in the Imperial Russian Army. He was of Russian ethnicity. His elder brother Mikhail Svechin (1876–1969) was a cavalry officer in the cuirassiers who fought in the Russo-Japanese War and World War I, joined the White movement in the Russian Civil War and died in France in 1969.

He studied at St. Petersburg Cadet Corps, then in the Mikhailovsky Artillery School. He graduated from the General Staff Academy in 1903.

== Career ==
He participated in the Russo-Japanese War of 1904-1905 as a Company Commander in the 22nd Eastern Siberian Regiment, and subsequently as a staff officer at the headquarters of the 16th Army Corps, and as a staff officer at the headquarters of the 3rd Manchurian Army.

In 1915 he was assigned the command of the 6th Finnish Regiment, and was later named Chief of Staff of the 7th Infantry Division. In 1916 he became the commander of the Black Sea Marine Division, a body of Russia's picked troops assigned for the planned Russian amphibious landings in the Bosphorus. Promoted to the rank of major general in 1916, he became the Chief of Staff of the Russian 5th Army.

Following the October Revolution of November 1917, Svechin joined the Bolsheviks in March 1918 and was immediately appointed military commander of the Smolensk region. He rose to become the head of the All-Russian General Staff.

In October 1918, disagreements with the Soviet commander-in-chief Jukums Vācietis caused the removal of Svechin from his position and his appointment as professor at the Academy of General Staff of the Workers' and Peasants' Red Army. The new position enabled Svechin to combine his talent as a writer with his knowledge of military strategy. His 1923 work Strategy (Russian: Стратегия) became required reading at Soviet military schools.

In February 1931, in a purge of former tsarist officers in the Red Army, Svechin was arrested and sentenced to five years imprisonment in the Gulag. However, in February 1932 he was released; he returned to active duty as a divisional commander in the Red Army, posted first at the intelligence agency of the General Staff and then at the Academy of General Staff of the Red Army.

== Death ==
Svechin was arrested on 30 December 1937 during the Great Purge. His name was included in death list No. 107, dated 26 July 1938 and signed by Joseph Stalin and Vyacheslav Molotov. On 29 July 1938, he was sentenced to death by the Military Collegium of the Supreme Court of the Soviet Union on charges of "participating in a counter-revolutionary organization" and "training terrorists". According to historian Alexander Hill, Svechin was executed on 29 August 1938, and his body buried in the Moscow region of Kommunarka.

He was rehabilitated within the framework of Mikhail Gorbachev's policy of glasnost. In 2013, Svechin's contribution to military theory was praised by Russian General Staff Chief Army General Valery Gerasimov.

His name appears in Aleksandr Solzhenitsyn's cycle of novels The Red Wheel. Also, Solzhenitsyn's The Gulag Archipelago, in its French edition, gives 1935 as the year of Svechin's execution.

== Works ==
- Kokoshin, Andrei Afanasievich; Larionov, Valentin Veniaminovich; Lobov, Vladimir Nikolayevich; Kipp, Jacob W. (2004) [1923, 1927]. Introduction. Strategy. By Svechin, Alexander Andreevich. Lee, Kent D. (ed.). Minnesota: East View Information Services. ISBN 1-879944-33-2.
- "The Art of Regiment Leadership", Moscow, 1930 (in Russian)

== Sources ==
- "Misreading Svechin: Attrition, Annihilation, and Historicism" by David R. Stone, The Journal of Military History No. 76, July 2012, pp. 673–693
