= Intent (military) =

Desired outcome of a military operation

For military strategy, intent is the desired outcome of a military operation. It is a key concept in 21st century military operations and is a vital element to facilitate subordinates' initiative and collaboration and cooperation amongst team members in joint operations.

== Intent content ==
In the reviewed open military doctrine literature, intent is a critical component for command and control. The many definitions that exist of intent are mostly similar, but the actual intent content differs and is unclear. Intent content can mainly be found as concept descriptions in doctrinal handbooks relating to development or impact usage of intent.

The following examples represent the doctrinal intent of the United Kingdom, Sweden, Canada, United States, and NATO.

- British Army Doctrine defines it as "Intent is similar to purpose. A clear intent initiates a force's purposeful activity. It represents what the commander wants to achieve and why; and binds the force together; it is the principal result of decision-making. It is normally expressed using effects, objectives and desired outcomes....The best intents are clear to subordinates with minimal amplifying detail."
- Swedish Armed Forces – Integrated Dynamic Command and Control (IDC2) define intent to "Intent is a concise formulation of the overall goals and purpose. The focus is to describe operations, restrictions and resource allocation."
- Canadian Forces Joint Publication 5.0: "Commander's Intent. This summary should provide the Commander's overall intent and establish the purpose of the plan. It is an important focusing statement for subordinate commanders. (1) Military Objectives. (2) Desired Military End-State. (3) Transition Conditions".
- US Field Manual 5.0 (2010) constitute the US Army's view on planning, preparing, executing, and assessing operations. "The commander's intent is a clear, concise statement of what the force must do and the conditions the force must establish with respect to the enemy, terrain, and civil considerations that represent the desired end state (FM 3–0). The commander's intent succinctly describes what constitutes success for the operation. It includes the operation's purpose and the conditions that define the end state. It links the mission, concept of operations, and tasks to subordinate units."
- NATO allied Joint publication 1 (AJP-01; 2010)provide the keystone doctrine for the planning, execution and support of Allied joint operations. "The intent defines the end-state in relation to the factors of mission; adversary, operating environment, terrain, forces, time and preparation for future operations. As such, it addresses what results are expected from the operation, how these results might enable transition to future operations, and how, in broad terms, the Commander expects the force to achieve those results. Its focus is on the force as a whole. Additional information on how the force will achieve the desired results is provided only to clarify the Commander's intentions."
- US Joint Publication 3.0 (2010) provides the doctrinal foundation and fundamental principles that guide the Armed Forces of the United States in the conduct of joint operations across the range of military operations. "Commander's intent is a clear and concise expression of the purpose of the operation and the military end state." and continues with "It also includes where the commander will accept risk during the operation. The initial intent statement normally contains the purpose and military end state as the initial inputs for the planning process."
- Other doctrinal work that have been used in this survey are US Field Manual 6.0 (2003) describe doctrine on C2 for tactical Army echelons (corps and below); US Field Manual 3–0 (2008) presents overarching doctrinal guidance and direction for conducting operations and is one of the two capstone doctrine handbooks for US Army; SwAF – Regulations for ground operations (Regler för markoperationer) (2009) UK Glossary of Joint and Multinational Terms and Definitions (2006)

In military doctrinal handbooks the identified intent artefacts generally express the initial state and situation, the desired end state and outcome, and how to get to the desired end state. Artefacts describing the initial situation are: own and other forces, adversaries, operating environment, terrain, time, preparation for future operations. Artefacts describing the outcome are: purpose, goals, mission, effects and end state. Artefacts describing how to reach the outcome are: concept of operations, tasks to subordinate units, risk willing, how results might enable transition to future operations, objectives, transition conditions, restrictions in conducting operations, allocation of resources, and expectations of force usage.

Another way to identify intent artefacts is from how people actually communicate intent. Klein (1998) presents the results of information types that is identified in intent communication. The seven information types of intent are according to Klein are: (1) Purpose of task which describes why the task is performed, (2) objective of task, presents a picture of the desired outcome, (3) sequence of steps in the plan. Klein identifies this to be a source of problem since too detailed descriptions may limit the subordinates initiative, (4) rationale for plan includes all the information that where present when making the decision, (5) key decisions that may have to be made, i.e. if there is a choice to be made the commander can provide the intent in how he wants it to be conducted, (6) antigoals, describe unwanted outcomes, and (7) constraints and other considerations describes weather and rule of engagement etc.

=== Intent content definition ===
The doctrinal artefacts are mapped into the structure provided by Klein and the resulting seven facets are grouped in: (a) Initial Situation describing initial situation and state and consists of Klein's rationale for the plan, (b) Outcome is describing outcomes and consists of Klein's Purpose of task, objective of task, and antigoals, and (c) Execution that is describing how to reach the outcome and consists of Klein's sequence of steps, key decisions and constraints and other considerations.

Intent is then defined to consist of the following eight facets.

- Mission/Goal – The purpose of the task (the higher-level goals). It provides the rationale why the missions and task are to be executed. It is a high-level definition of the overall intent and is regularly stated in one sentence following on the form of Who, What, When, Where and Why. A Mission/Goal can be described by using the Actions, Effects or a compound State, i.e. situation. Mission/Goal belongs to the intent group outcome.
- End-State – The objective of the task in form of a representation of the desired outcome. The desired outcome is described as a state, e.g. completion of a task, the effects from tasks, or even the execution of tasks over time. The purpose is to provide a picture of the End-State. According to Klein (1998) in his investigation, the end-state objective was only missing once in the thirty five examined Commander's intent statements. Effect is in this work defined as the physical and/or behavioural state of a system that results from an action, a set of actions, or another effect. The End State is a more detail description of the Mission/Goal statement and can be described in several sentences. An End State can be described by using the Actions, Effects or a compound State, i.e. situation. End State belongs to the intent group outcome.
- Sequence – The sequence of steps in the plan – This is the plan that describes what do in general terms such as Courses of Actions and Course of Effects. Sequence belongs to the intent group execution describing how to reach the desired outcome and include concept of operations, tasks to subordinate units, how results might enable the transition to future operations, allocation of resources, and expectations of force usage.
- Initial State – The situation that builds the rationale for the plan, what information was available, who was making the decisions, under what time pressure and similar circumstances. Initial State encompass own and other forces, adversaries, operating environment, terrain, time, preparation for future operations. Initial State belongs to the intent group initial situation.
- Key Decisions – The key decisions that may have to be made and guide the commander in how to make choices. Key Decisions belongs to the intent group execution and describes how to reach the desired outcome and encompass how results might enable the transition to future operations, transition conditions and expectations of force usage.
- Antigoals – Antigoals describe undesired outcomes. Antigoals are meaningful when to clarify alternatives action plans and what the resulting outcome might be. Antigoals are described in the same way as End State with the difference in that antigoals describe the unwanted outcome. In the surveyed doctrinal descriptions of intent, antigoals were not mentioned. Antigoals belong to the intent outcome.
- Constraints – Constraints and other considerations that should be taken into account and can vary from policy to weather and terrain. Constraints belongs to the intent group execution and encompass risk willing, restrictions in conducting operations, allocation of resources, and expectations of force usage.
- An eight facet Expressives is proposed in Gustavsson to capture the style of organizations and commanders: experience, risk taking, use of power and force, diplomacy; ethics; norms; morale; creativity; and unorthodox behaviour. The use of Expressives can range from situations where participants (e.g. commanders) express their style to other participants (e.g. subordinates), or by Staff that develop models over the participants (commanders and subordinates) to be used in Course of Action development and war gaming. In both cases Expressives are a support to better understand the collaboration participants' capabilities and conduct of operations.

== Intent in command and control ==
=== Commander's intent ===
Commander's intent is an intent describing military-focused operations and it is a publicly stated description of the end-state as it relates to forces (entities, people) and terrain, the purpose of the operation, and key tasks to accomplish. It is developed by a small group, e.g. staff, and a commander.

Commander's intent (CSI) plays a central role in military decision making and planning. CSI acts as a basis for staffs and subordinates to develop their own plans and orders to transform thought into action, while maintaining the overall intention of their commander.

The commander's intent links the mission and concept of operations. It describes the end state and key tasks that, along with the mission, are the basis for subordinates' initiative. Commanders may also use the commander's intent to explain a broader purpose beyond that of the mission statement. The mission and the commander's intent must be understood two echelons down. state that intent is more than an aim or a purpose; they state that Intent contains the aim and purpose together with all implications. Hence, CSI is not only to describe the End-State but also a concise expression of the purpose of the operation. CSI may also include the commander's assessment of the adversary commander's intent and an assessment of where and how much risk is acceptable during the operation. This view is supported by Klein (1998).

CSI originates from one commander's mind and is disseminated to the echelons below. CSI rarely gets reviewed and updated. For a short duration mission, such as a deliberate attack, the original statement may remain valid throughout planning. But for longer phases, in order to be agile the CSI might be changing in phase with the unfolding of the situation. Commanders must develop their intent within the bounds of a whole hierarchy of guiding principles that limit the types of solutions that they can entertain.

=== Common intent ===
Common intent is an intent that is shared and understood by all participants, i.e. there is no discrepancy between the intent of the participating humans. Common intent is an idealized view of intent.

In today's operational environment teams need to work together towards a desired End-State. Pigeau and McCann (2000) define Command and Control as "the establishment of common intent to achieve coordinated action." Common intent is the combination of explicit intent and implicit intent. Pigeau and McCann (2006)put forward that for a realizable Common Intent there need to be a single shared objective, together with a clear understanding in how that objective can be attained. They continue that Common Intent is an idealized concept where maximum overlap, with minimum scattering, exists between the intent of the commander and the intents of his subordinates. Knowledge known by the commander and his subordinates needs to be shared at all levels, guiding principles, reasoning ability, and to express similar levels of commitment. Intent is then not only something for a commander to disseminate but to exchange and learning the team members' intent. Farrell (2004) states that common intent describes a socio-psychological phenomenon that seems to be evident amongst a team that achieves a common objective. The CSI is a sort of a one person's view, but as said in the introduction "every individual have intent of her own" implies that it may not just be enough to disseminate intent amongst staff members and subordinates. A conclusion of the work of Farrell (2006) is that teams with different military and civilian cultures would need that all team members establish a common understanding of the mission objectives and the Commander's intent with respect to their own competencies, authorities, and responsibilities.

Pigeau and McCann (2006) state that diverse team members need to have a high degree of common intent to perform effectively. In such teams the commander needs to ensure that the intent is perceived and understood by all team members. Alberts and Hayes (2007) say that in order to allow subordinates' initiative the operations order focuses on describing the CSI/CI so that flexibility in coordination and collaboration in the dynamic environment is entailed. There is a need for the commander to connect the subordinates' human potential (reason, opinions, questions, seek information regarding the mission) to align and be a support to the commanders own intent.

=== Command intent ===
Command intent (CI) is a practical view of common intent, meaning that it is not plausible to expect that all individuals during a whole mission in all situations will share the same intent. CI will be developed for specific parts of missions and shared amongst the participants. To establish CI the involvement of all participants is necessary, e.g. compare with football or soccer teams where the overall intent is formalized by coaches in collaboration with the players and where each player knows what the other players' intentions are.

Pigeau and McCann (2000) state that "In reality, it is presumed true that it is impossible to have common intent". For a specific mission bounded for a certain time an overlap of intent ought to be achievable, e.g. as illustrated by the players in a soccer team where all have individual goals with their lives and families, but on the soccer field they have the common intent to win the game. This means that during the game, and in training and exercises prior to and after the game their common intent is to perform well according to the mission declared by the coach.

A workable version of common intent is command intent that is directed for a specific situation, bounded by participating organization, space and time, i.e. for the operation at hand the intent is common but other intent and goals of the participating humans may differ. Much of the coordination can be done locally, i.e. on a lower level, without explicit orders. Brehmer (2009) proposes that the higher levels of command will have the time to consider other aspects of the problems facing them. Brehmer continues that there is the loss of combat power inherent in top-down command-directed synchronization. By NATO Network Enabled Capabilities (NNEC) as presented by Alberts, Garstka and Stein (1999) this is overcome by a high-speed continuum. Brehmer (2009) however says that the main responsibility of the commander and his staff is to articulate intent and crafting rules of engagement. For armed forces that have mission command as their principal doctrine this is not a new concept, but Brehmer further envisions that with articulated intent larger units will be able to co-ordinate with other units and conduct the mission without any explicit directions from higher headquarters. Command Intent is then an outline of a plan, objectives to be achieved, responsibilities, linkages and schemas of manoeuvre, and constraints. Establishing command intent also involves more than one person. Traditional Commander's intent is then replaced by an intent that arises from dialogue between commanders and key staff at more than one level.

Command intent is to allow self-synchronization and to provide understanding of the complex causes and effects. To enable self-synchronization the subordinates must be given the mandate to operate on their own initiatives, within the boundary of the mission. Curts and Cambell (2006) address this fine line between delegating authority and maintaining and controlling hierarchy The commander delegating authority must refrain from directing the actions of subordinates, yet must also maintain some command structure. The subordinates must have the ability to work independently or within a team to achieve the mission goals. To create this empowerment the commander's information should be shared with everyone. Autonomy is created by setting boundaries and hierarchy then can be replaced by self-directed teams. CI acts as a basis for staffs and subordinates to develop their own plans and orders that transform thought into action, while maintaining the overall intention of their commanders.

=== Explicit and implicit intent ===
Explicit intent is an intent that is publicly stated and made available for the participants. Implicit intent is an intent that is not publicly stated. Implicit intent can be made explicit by the mechanism described below.

Shattuck and Woods (2000) examined the role of communicating intent. In the study, company commanders received a battalion order including the battalion Commander's intent. Then changes to the situation were introduced and the actions performed by the company commanders were compared with the intent of the battalion commander. The result was that the company commanders matched their battalion commander's intent in only 34% of the cases. Pigeau and McCann (2000) introduced that intent consists of an explicit part and an implicit part.

Explicit intent is the one that is publicly stated for all the headquarters staff and subordinates to perceive, think about, and act upon. The explicit intent is either vocalized (i.e. made publicly) in doctrine, orders, statements or can be derived from questions and answers. Theoretically, each staff and subordinate member should be able to reiterate the commander's intent at any point during the process.

Implicit intent consists of all the un-vocalized expectations that the commander and all team members have. The implicit intent is developed over a longer time, prior to the mission, and develops from the style of how the commander is conducting the operations with respect to experience, risk willing, use of power and force, diplomacy, ethics, social values, moral, norms, creativity and unorthodox behaviour and the concepts, policies, laws and doctrine agreed to by military, civil, organizations, agencies, nations and coalitions.

Farell (2004) proposed that implicit intent is an internal expectation of Commander's intent. The example used by Farell (2004) is that with an explicit intent "to capture the hill" the implicit intent might be "to capture the hill with minimal battle damage" or "to capture the hill with Air Force assets only." The implicit expectations depend on how the members interpret Commander's intent from personal expectations based on their style and experience, and with the staff position (e.g., planner, operator, commander, etc.). Farell (2004) provided a way of finding implicit intent by asking questions of the form "from perspective x, how do you interpret Commander's intent?"

Implicit intent can be made explicit by transforming the implicit into explicit statements. The commander can vocalize the Personal, Military or Cultural implicit intent. The commander can be monitored, e.g. by his subordinates, and his team members, who then draw conclusions about the commanders implicit intent. In the same way a commander can draw conclusions regarding his subordinates. Pigeau and McCann (2000) presented some mechanisms of making original implicit intent made explicit. They are: (1) Externalization is when a commander or subordinate make the internal intents explicit declared; (2) Internalization is a version of tacit learning, when a commander presents the intent and the mouth is saying something and the body language signals something different, or add context and meaning that are put into the mental model and affects the implicit intent; (3) Socialization is meeting and talking and performing exercises together, teaming, i.e. is to find the implicit intent and motives etc.; and (4) Dialogue is the explicit stated, publicly vocalized available description of an individual's intent.

== Computational models of intent ==
- Joint Consultation, Command and Control Information Exchange Data Model (JC3IEDM) convey Intent by free-text.
- Coalition Battle Management Language (C-BML) do not convey intent explicitly. However, with the structure it could express intent.
- Command and Control Lexical Grammar (C2LG) convey Intent by the rule CI - (KeyTasks) EndState (ExpandedPurpose). Where CI is command intent and derived from US field manual 5 (2005). C2LG do not convey intent in the format describe in the intent content section above.
- Operations Intent and Effects Grammar (OIEG) convey intent as described in the intent content section above by the rule intent - intent: [Goal] {End State} [Sequence] [Initial State] [{Key Decision}]* [Antigoal]* [Constraint]* [{Intent ID}]

== See also ==
- Mission-type tactics
- Command and control
- Truppenführung

Models of intent

- Joint Consultation, Command and Control Information Exchange Data Model
- Battle management language
