= Command by negation =

Military command and control doctrine

Command by negation is a military command and control doctrine - a hybrid of command by direction and command by influence. Commonly found in the United States Navy, particularly in independent commands at sea, the doctrine is based on individual officers using their own initiative to execute actions unless the reported action receives a negative order, freeing their superiors from directly commanding every unit in a large theater and allowing them to focus on the bigger picture.

== History and evolution ==
Most commonly found in the United States Navy, the doctrine evolved in the 1980s, although a variant known as Auftragstaktik was used by the German armed forces in the Second World War. Traditionally, naval engagements had been conducted in the same way for 400 years: the task force commander would coordinate centrally. Improved technology led to warfare moving faster, which necessitated a shift away from central control; a commander had to be able to focus on the wider picture, and would not be able to effectively do that if they were also dictating the actions of every individual subordinate. Command by negation first came into being on individual ships, where it made sense - a captain who delegated authority and exercised command by negation could easily monitor his staff and communicate with them because it was a small environment. Within wider naval engagements, however, the Officer in Tactical Command (OTC) still maintained a rigid control structure, because communications systems simply couldn't work efficiently enough to make loose and autonomous doctrines viable.

This changed with improvements in the 1970s and 80s to networking, communications and the amount of information available to an OTC. The introduction of AEW&C systems, SOSUS and satellite-fed data risked overwhelming the OTC, and so forces were forced to shift towards granting individual commanders more autonomy - something that improved communications made possible. This eventually resulted in the concept of a Composite Warfare Commander (CWC).

== Practice ==
In practice, the doctrine is built around the idea that individual ship commanders or officers will be allowed to undertake autonomous operations. In exchange, they report their intention to do so to their superior officer, noting that the action will be taken "UNODIR" - UNless Otherwise DIRected - and provide a continual stream of information to the superior officer, who is not required to sign off on the plan or execute it, but only gets involved if the superior objects. Command by negation is the "override" that allows the superior officer to step in if they take issue with the plan, but otherwise allows the subordinate officer to operate as they see fit.

The primary advantage of command by negation are that the doctrine frees up the OTC to look at the bigger picture; unlike in traditional naval warfare, they are no longer required to actively coordinate the actions of each vessel or unit under their command. In addition, it allows individual commanding officers closer to the ground, with a better sense of the tactical position, to operate autonomously and contribute to the task force's overall actions. Command by negation suffers from the disadvantage of autonomous and decentralised command and control generally - that too much information may be generated, increasing the temptation for senior officers to interfere with the actions of individual units and nullify the advantages command by negation provides, and that the (tactically sensible) actions of a subordinate may needlessly escalate any situation.

== See also ==
- Management by exception

== Bibliography ==
- McNamara, Louis C. (2001). "Riding the Information-Revolution Tiger". Air and Space Power Journal (Fall 2001). United States Air Force. ISSN 1554-2505.
- English, Allan (2007). Networked Operations and Transformation: Context and Canadian Contributions. McGill-Queen's Press. ISBN 978-0773560505.
- Mack, William P. (1998). The Naval Officer's Guide. Naval Institute Press. ISBN 1557506450.
- Mamikonian, Alex (2005). NS 310: Strategy and Tactics. 9781591145233. Naval Institute Press.
- Worley, Duane Robert (2006). Shaping U.S. Military Forces: Revolution Or Relevance in a Post-Cold War World. Praeger Security International Series. Greenwood Publishing Group. ISBN 9780275990312.
