= Truppenführung =

German Army field manual

Truppenführung ("Handling of Combined-Arms Formations") was a German Army field-manual published in two parts as Heeresdienstvorschrift 300: Part 1, promulgated in 1933, and Part 2 in 1934.

The original German-language text, which is notable for its clarity, was prepared by a group led by Colonel General Ludwig Beck (1880–1944) (who was later executed by the Nazi regime for his part in the 1944 plot against Hitler). The original publication consisted of a two-part, soft-cover, pocket-sized manual, which was issued to all commissioned officers and senior non-commissioned officers. It contained basic military doctrine for the German land forces (Heer), in use from its first publication up to the end of World War II. The book was known by the nickname "Tante Frieda" or "T.F." A modified form is still in use today by the Federal German Army (Deutsches Heer). The approximate equivalent U.S. Army field-manual was FM 100–5, now re-issued as FM 3–0, Operations (with later revisions) and available for download at the U.S. Army website. The British Army equivalent manual is Field Service Regulations, available for download at the British Army website.

== Background ==
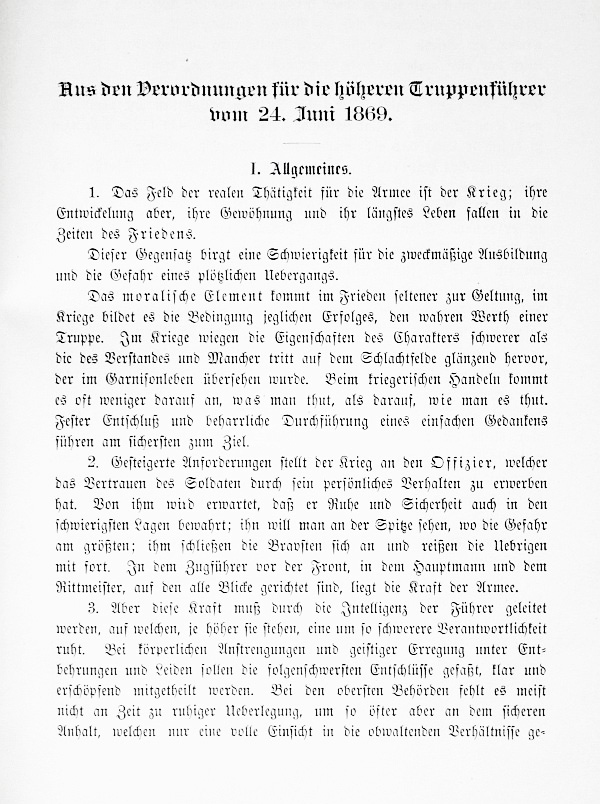
First page of von Moltke's Instructions for Large Unit Commanders, 1869

Truppenführung has its doctrinal origins in the late 19th century Prussian Army although its traditions go back to the Scharnhorst reforms of 1810–1812. The modern basis of this Field Manual can be seen in the reforms of Helmuth von Moltke the Elder in the mid 19th century. It was in Moltke’s "Instructions for Large Unit Commanders" and his concept of separated armies from which modern German doctrine emerged. The system of moving units separately and concentrating as an army before a battle, resulted in more efficient supply and lower vulnerability to modern firepower. To enable a successful flanking attack, he asserted that concentration could only take place after the commencement of a battle. This was a development of the Scharnhorst concept of "March Divided, Fight United".

A consequence of this innovation was the commander's loss of overall control of his forces, due to the limits of means of communication which, at that time were visual (line-of-sight) or couriers, either mounted or on foot. The traditional concept of the elimination of uncertainty by means of total obedience became obsolete and operational initiative had to be delegated to a point further down the chain of command. In this new concept, commanders of distant detachments were required to exercise initiative in their decision making and Moltke emphasised the benefits of developing officers, who could do this within the limits of the senior commander’s intention.

He accomplished this by means of directives stating his intentions, rather than detailed orders and was willing to accept deviations from a directive, provided that it was within the framework of the mission. Moltke held this view firmly and it later became a fundamental of all German military theory. Other theorists were critical but Moltke’s insistence that local commanders be allowed freedom of action, has been defended by many German writers together with the concept that large armies made a loose style of command necessary. Prussian and German Field Service Regulations published after 1870 confirm this concept and it is listed, word for word, in Truppenführung of 1933:

== Details ==
Section 15

Every man, from the youngest soldier upward, must be required at all times and in all situations to commit his whole mental, spiritual and physical strength. Only in this way will the full force of a unit be brought to bear in decisive action. Only thus will men develop, who will in the hour of danger maintain their courage and decisiveness and carry their weaker comrades with them to achieve deeds of daring.

The first criterion in war remains decisive action. Everyone from the highest commander down to the youngest soldier, must be constantly aware that inaction and neglect incriminate him more severely than any error in the choice of means. (emphasis in the original text)

At the beginning of the First World War, the German armed forces were using a set of Field Service Regulations which had been issued in 1905. Their doctrine drew heavily on Clausewitz and von Moltke the Elder but the main influence was that of General Alfred von Schlieffen, then Chief of the General Staff. Many in the German army of the period did not accept some of Clausewitz's concepts such as the importance of the defense and the relationship between war and politics. Although the traditional image of stagnation and trench warfare is correct, this period also produced many of the tactical concepts which are associated with modern warfare. On the defense (1915–1917) they pioneered and mastered: flexible defense, defense-in-depth and reverse-slope defense. On the offense in 1918, they perfected fluid non-linear infiltration tactics supported by artillery (cf. Stormtrooper).

After the end of World War I, the Reichswehr, under the direction of General Hans von Seeckt, very carefully studied the conduct and developments of the war. The result of the von Seeckt reforms was the new tactical doctrine manual H. Dv.487, Führung und Gefecht der verbundenen Waffen ("Command and Battle of the Combined Arms"), now generally known as das Fug, published as Part 1 in 1921 and Part 2 in 1923.

An important introduction in the post-World War I reforms was the introduction of Auftragstaktik, which can be translated as "Mission Command" (U.K. forces definition) or "Mission-Type Orders, or Directive Control" (United States forces) and mission-type tactics (Federal German Army). The principle is that the senior commander states his intention (the mission) to his subordinate commanders. He informs them of the mission, the available means and the timeframe within which the mission has to be accomplished. He then places mission planning and execution in the hands of his subordinates and holds himself available to offer helpful advice and suggestions, but only if requested.

For Auftragstaktik to work, it is necessary that a subordinate leader, or even a common soldier, has to fully understand the commander’s intent, also to the next higher level of command, and the purpose of the mission. If he does not understand, then he has the obligation to ask.

In 1925, von Seeckt noted

The principal thing now is to increase the responsibilities of the individual soldier, particularly his independence of action, with the profitable result of increasing the capability of the individual.

== Influence ==
The influence of das Fug and Truppenführung on the Reichswehr and later the Heer, was wide-ranging.

1. The delegation of command responsibility throughout the army, as necessary for the accomplishment of a mission and, if required, down to the individual soldier.
2. The removal of social barriers between officers and men where the command relationship is based upon mutual respect, trust and confidence, as described in Truppenführung sections 7 and 12.
3. The preparation for the introduction of aircraft, armored units and combined-arms units some years before the first armored division was formed in the Heer.
4. The concept that the conduct of operations cannot be defined or laid down in field manuals, or other regulations which inhibit a commanders’ flexibility.

Truppenführung in this sense was not a set of rules but rather a set of intellectual tools which could be consulted at any time and which would provide intellectual stimulus in any given situation. The unpredictable and chaotic nature of warfare is specifically referred to in the following sections of the manual (quoted in full):

== Lynne-Rienner Edition 2001 ==
Section 2 The conduct of war is subject to continual development. New weapons dictate ever-changing forms. Their appearance must be anticipated and their influence evaluated. They must be placed in service quickly.

Section 4 Lessons in the art of war cannot be exhaustively compiled in the form of regulations. The principles enunciated must be applied in accordance with the situation. Simple actions, logically carried out will lead most surely to the objective.

Section 6 The command of an army and its subordinate units requires leaders capable of judgement, with clear vision and foresight, and the ability to make independent and decisive decisions and carry them out unwaveringly and positively. Such leaders must be impervious to the changes in the fortunes of war and possess full awareness of the high degree of responsibility placed on their shoulders.

=== On leadership and the qualities of officers ===
Section 7 An officer is in every sense a teacher and a leader. In addition to his knowledge of men and his sense of justice, he must be distinguished by superior knowledge and experience, by moral excellence, by self-discipline and by high courage.

Section 8 The example and personal bearing of officers and other soldiers who are responsible for leadership has a decisive effect on the troops. The officer, who in the face of the enemy displays coolness, decisiveness and courage, carries his troops with him. He also must win their affection and earn their trust through his understanding of their feelings, their way of thinking, and through his selfless care for them. Mutual trust is the surest foundation for discipline in times of need and danger.

=== On the value of the individual soldier ===
Section 10 The decisive factor, despite technology and weaponry, is the value of the individual soldier. The wider his experience in combat, the greater his importance. The emptiness of the battlefield (die Leere des Schlachtfelds) requires soldiers who can think and act independently, who can make calculated, decisive and daring use of every situation and who understand that victory depends on each individual. Training, physical fitness, selflessness, determination, self-confidence and daring equip a man to master the most difficult situations..

Section 12 Leaders must live with their troops and share in their dangers and deprivations, their joys and sorrows. Only thus can they acquire a first-hand knowledge of the combat capabilities and needs of their soldiers. The individual is a part of the whole and is not only responsible for himself alone but also for his comrades. He who is capable of more than the others, who can achieve more, must guide and lead the inexperienced and the weak. Out of such a foundation grows genuine comradeship, which is as important between the leaders and the men as it is among the men themselves.

As Matthew Cooper states in his book The German Army 1933-45,

"On the question of tactics, die Truppenführung was a brilliant exposition of modern principles and drew sound lessons from Germany’s terrible experience in the 1914-1918 war. Initiative, decisive manoeuvre and envelopment were the keynotes of the German tactical doctrine. Its success in the war years was to prove immeasurably superior to the methods of its enemies"

Truppenführung today is still widely considered to be one of the most influential military manuals ever produced. Surprisingly, until 2001 very little of its text was available in English except for some roughly translated excerpts and hand written notes in U.S. military archives and Gen. Wedermeyer's report on the Prussian General Staff College. Equally surprisingly, the manual was classified by the United States military authorities until 2001 when the first full English translation was completed.
