= Multilateral Interoperability Programme =

NATO-centred military coordination organization

The Multilateral Interoperability Programme (MIP) is an effort to deliver an assured capability for information interoperability to support multinational, combined and joint military operations. The goal of the Programm is to support all levels from corps to battalion and focuses on command and control (C2) systems. MIP is a consortium of 27 NATO and Non-NATO nations that meet quarterly to work on the next iteration of its Products. It has standing collaborations with the NATO Allied Command Transformation (ACT) and the European Defense Agency (EDA).^{[1][2]}

== Overview ==
The Multilateral Interoperability Programme referred to as MIP, is an interoperability standard consortium, established by national C2IS developers, with a requirement to share relevant C2 information in a multinational or coalition environment. As a result of collaboration within the programme, MIP produces a set of specifications which, when implemented by the nations, provide the required interoperability capability. MIP provides a venue for system level interoperability testing of national MIP implementations as well as providing a forum for exchanging information relevant to national implementation and fielding plans to enable synchronisation. MIP is NOT empowered to direct how nations develop their own C2IS.

NATO and MIP share a common interest in building, testing, verifying and improving information exchange Models and derived specifications.

== Reasons for establishing MIP ==
Interoperability among allied armed forces is more important today, than it ever was. Warfare, and the need for timely information exchange between allies, has changed tremendously over the last 100 years. If technology, terminology and command structures are not harmonized, a joint force is neither able to act fast, nor as one unit.

To improve Interoperability alliances around the globe, such as NATO, EU and UN, are continuously working on standardizing their command and control information systems. MIP works outside their bureaucratic frameworks to spearhead and test solutions. Many of MIP's efforts end up being covered by NATO in STANAGs.

== History ==
The need for Interoperability between command and control information systems became readily apparent toward the end of the 20th century. MIP as we know it today is the result of 3 separate C2 initiatives:

- Army Tactical Command and Control Information System (ATTCIS, 1980)

- Battlefield Interoperability Programme for Lower Echelon Command and Control Systems (BIP, 1995)

- Quadrilateral Interoperability Programme (QIP, 1998)

The MIP was formed in 1998 by project managers of Canada, Germany, France, Great Britain, Italy and the US, as a merge between BIP and QIP. In 2004 it went on to combine all data modeling activities, including the ATTCIS. Among the successes of the MIP are the C2IEDM and the JC3IEDM. Both are covered in NATO STANAG and both are predecessors to the MIM.

== Products ==
=== NATO STANAG 5523 (C2IEDM) ===
The Command and Control Information Exchange Data Model (C2IEDM, predecessor to the JC3IEDM) is a data model that is managed by the MIP. It originated with experts from various NATO partners and from the Partnership for Peace nations.

=== NATO STANAG 5525 (JC3IEDM) ===
The Joint Command, Control and Consultation Information Exchange Data Model (JC3IEDM) is first and foremost an information exchange data model. The model can also serve as a coherent basis for other information exchange mechanisms, such as message formats, currently lacking a unified information structure. It supports data exchange over XML and is the most successful evolution in a long line of data models. JC3IEDM is intended to represent the core of the data identified for exchange across multiple functional areas and multiple views of the requirements. Toward that end, it lays down a common approach to describing the information to be exchanged.

=== MIM - MIP Information Model ===
MIM is a reference model that provides the taxonomic and semantic foundation for information exchange in the C2 domain. The goal is to harmonize current information exchange concepts and create a common ontology tailored to the needs of joint/combined military operations. MIP has submitted a proposal to cover its information model in the STANAG 5643 to the NATO Digital Policy Committee (DPC) (formerly known as C3 Board). MIM is the baseline for the MIP 4.x Information Exchange Specification (MIP4.x-IES), which offers a service oriented architecture and expands on the data exchange capabilities of its predecessor JC3IEDM. Current Version of MIM is 5.3 which was released in July 2025.

=== MIP IES – MIP Information Exchange Specification ===
The IES is the actual product of MIP to be implemented in C2 systems. MIP 4.5 IES is the newest released Version (released in May 2025) and part of the Federated Mission Network (FMN) Spiral 6. Implementation guidance and Documentation is available through member nations. MIP 4.6 IES is scheduled to be released 2027.

== MIP Members ==
The Full members are:^{[3]}

France, Germany, the Netherlands, Spain, Türkiye, the United Kingdom, the United States of America.

The Associated members are:

Canada, Denmark, Austria, Belgium, the Czech Republic, Greece, Hungary, Lithuania, Norway, New Zealand, Poland, Romania, Switzerland, Ukraine^{[4]} as well as Allied Command Transformation.

Full members commit to support the collaborative development of MIP solutions (with at least 3 Persons) and must express intention to field those solutions.

Associated members can take part in the development process (with at least 1 Person) and fielding of MIP solutions, but have no voting rights at meetings.
