= Moltke Bridge =

Bridge in Berlin

Moltke Bridge (Moltkebrücke)
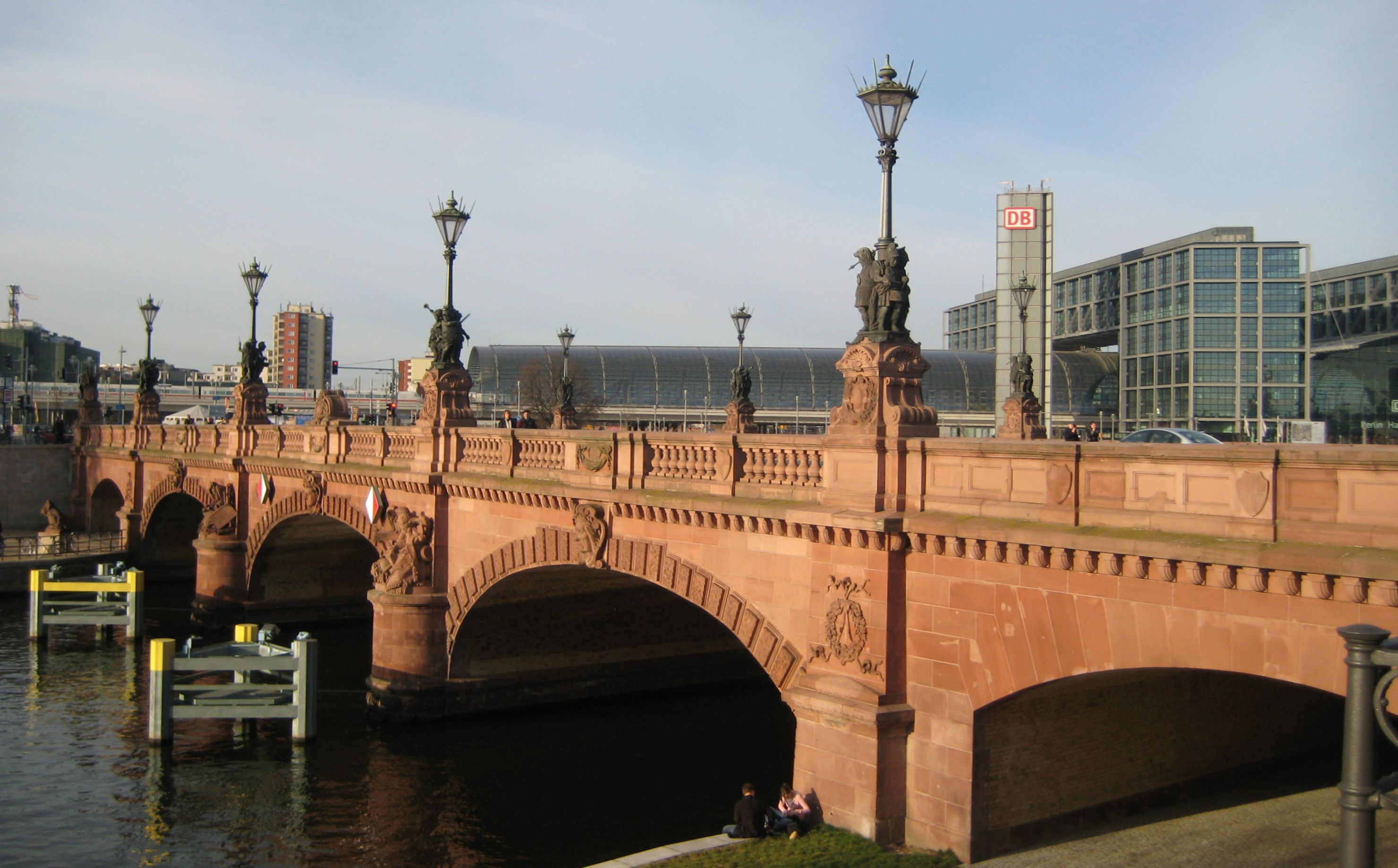
- Coordinates: 52°31′19″N 13°22′7″E
- Crosses: Spree River
- Locale: Berlin

Characteristics
- Design: Stone arch
- Total length: 77.6 m (255 ft)

Location
- Interactive map of Moltke Bridge (Moltkebrücke)

Moltke Bridge is a bridge over the Spree River in Berlin, Germany. Completed in 1891, it connects Alt-Moabit near the main railway station on the north bank to Willy-Brandt-Straße and the Chancellery on the south bank. The bridge is named after Field Marshal Helmuth von Moltke the Elder (1800–1891), chief of staff of the Prussian Army for thirty years. Moltke died just before the bridge's completion and it was inaugurated by his funeral cortege. The bridge has three crossed arches spanning the Spree made from red Main sandstone, decorated with statues of Johannes Boese, Carl Piper and Carl Begas.

== History ==
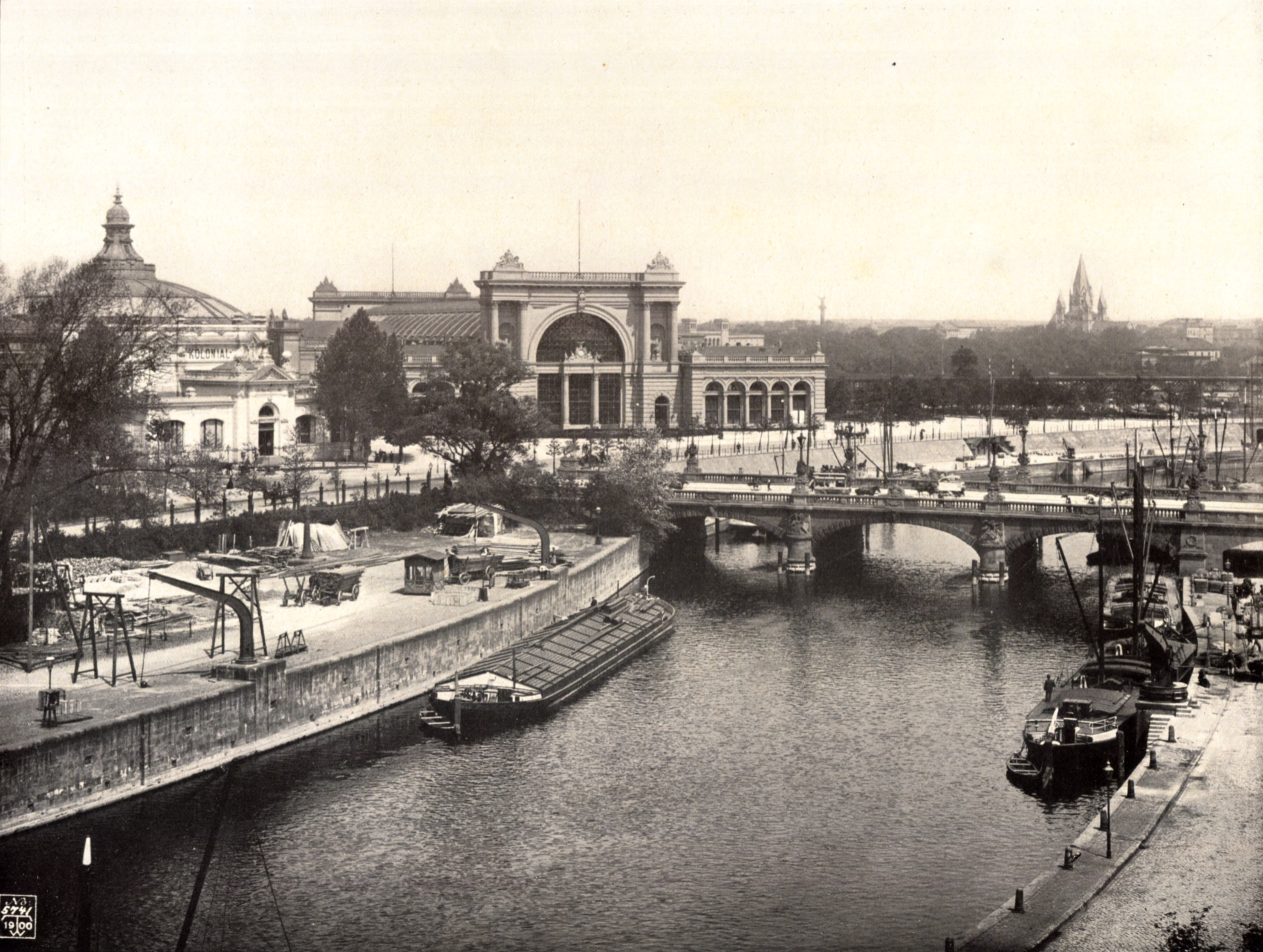
The Moltke bridge around 1900

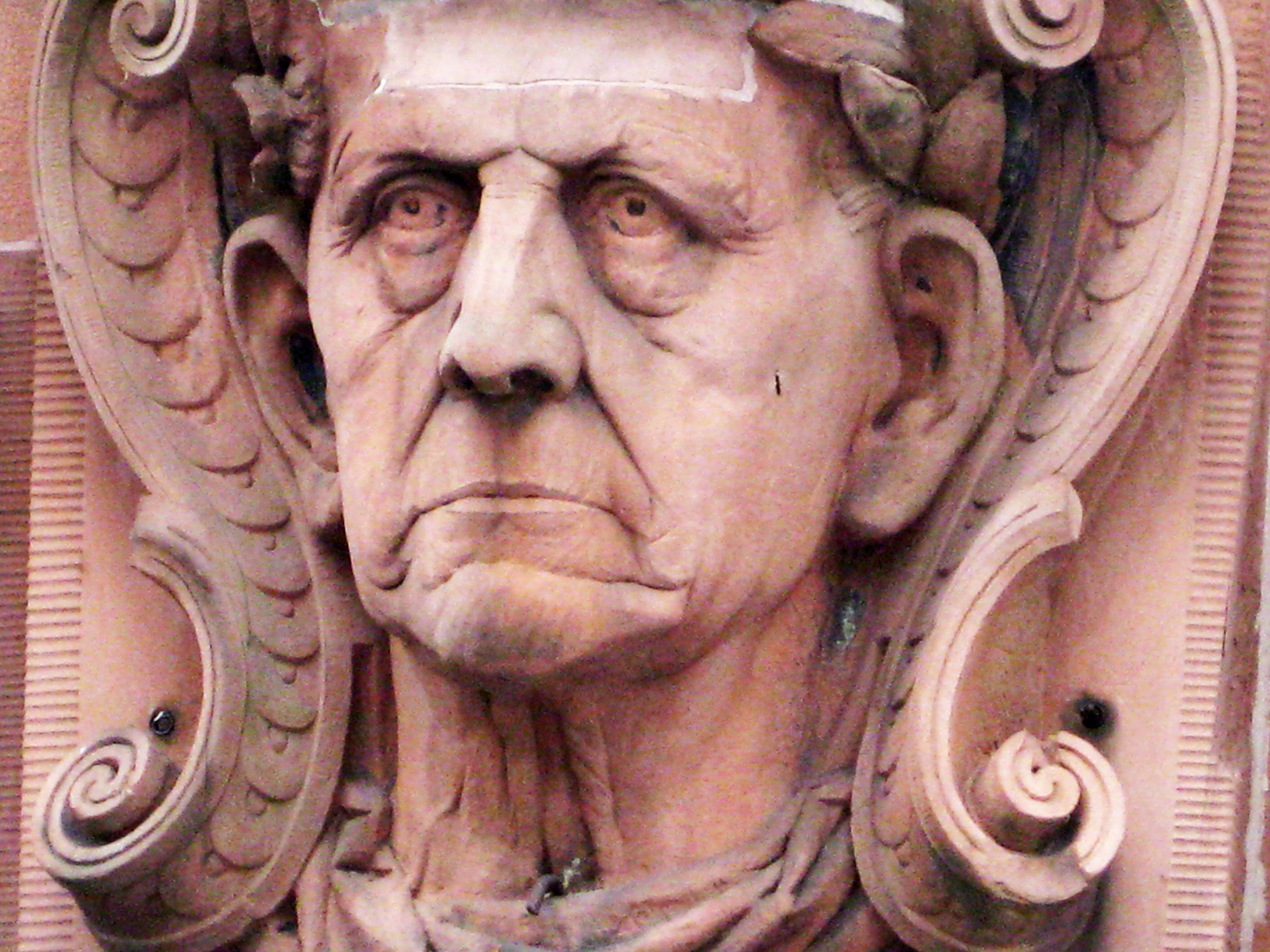
Moltke Bridge Berlin - Stone Head of Field Marshal Helmuth von Moltke

Construction started in 1888 and was completed in 1891. The bridge saw heavy fighting during the Battle of Berlin in April 1945 at the end of World War II. German defenders, about 5000 members of the SS and Volksturm, barricaded the bridge at both ends and wired it for demolition. On 28 April, units of the Soviet 3rd Shock Army, commanded by Major-General S.N. Perevertkin, fought their way down Alt-Moabit towards the bridge. Their goal was the capture of the German Reichstag, only 600 metres (about 660 yards) from the bridge. At dusk, the Soviets assaulted the bridge. The detonation charges damaged the bridge, with a section falling into the Spree, but enough stood for men and vehicles to cross. By midnight, the Soviet 150th and 171st rifle divisions had secured the bridgehead against any counterattack the Germans could muster. From here they moved on the Reichstag, which they captured on 2 May.

Though damaged, the bridge was one of the few to survive the war and looks similar to the original construction, though it was repaired and strengthened to take the weight of modern traffic.
