= Mission-type tactics =

Form of military command

Mission-type tactics (German: Auftragstaktik, from Auftrag and Taktik; lit. 'mission tactics'), known in the United States and the United Kingdom as mission command is a style of military command in which a superior gives subordinates a defined objective, the intent behind it and the means to achieve it, but leaves the choice of method to the subordinate. It developed in the Prussian then later German armies during the 19th century then later adopted in modified form by several Western armies from the late 20th century.

Despite its name the concept isn't confined to the tactical levels and is not a set of tactics in the English sense. It is better understood as a leadership method, or command culture, that was intended to operate at the operational level as well.

Historians disagree about how consistently it was practised even in the German Army, and some argue that modern "Mission Command" doctrines differ substantially from their German antecedent.

== Terminology ==
''Auftragstaktik'' combines ''Auftrag'' ( a task, the "purpose and objective") with ''Taktik''; The second element refers to the manner of execution being left to the commander rather than to tactics as such. The term first appeared in German military publications in the 1890's. Related terms including ''Auftragsverfahren'' ("task method") and ''Auftragskampf'' ("task battle"), were also used and the concept had not bee previously identified by a single name. Its opponents in the late 19th century, the advocates of ''Normaltaktik'' ("standardised tactics"), favoured, uniform, formulaic procedures.

The modern Bundeswehr uses the term ''Führen mit Auftrag'' ("leading by mission"), although ''Auftragstaktik'' remains the more widespread informal term. English languages also use "mission type orders" and "directive control". Several authors regard these translations as misleading, since the German concept describes a whole command philosophy rather than a manor of phrasing orders.

== Concept ==
In outline, a superior states the mission, the commander's commander's intent, available forces and any essential constraints such as time or boundaries. the subordinate decides how to proceed and is expected to adapt to changing circumstances without waiting for further orders. The approach rests on several conditions:

=== Understanding of intent. ===
Subordinates must grasp what the superior is trying to achieve, so they can act in its spirit when orders no longer fit the situation.

=== Education and training ===
Muth argues that introducing the concept requires a new type of officer and that the reform of officer education in the Prussian and German armies was closely tied to it.

=== Trust and supporting culture ===
Stahel stressed that success depended on cultural characteristics that cannot easily be set out on command chart, and that the concept was never intended to allow unlimited freedom: obedience to the superior's intent had to be maintained.

According to Widder, the leader on the spot (''Führer vor Ort'') is responsible for the judging if the situation has changed so that an order no longer applies and must justify any deviation afterwards. Sigg observed that the line between exceeding one's remit and acting independently within the spirit of intent was thin and difficult to define. The concept is closely linked to the Prussian-German understanding of war, influenced by Clausewitz, as shaped by friction and chance. If war could not be controlled in detail, military leadership was understood to be a matter of directing rather than controlling it. Helmuth von Moltke the Elder also held that no plan of operation could be relied upon beyond first contact with the main enemy force.

== History ==
=== Prussian origins ===
Stahel, drawing on Leistenschneider's research, places the origins of the concept in the reforms that followed Prince William's assumption of the Prussian regency in 1858, rather than the Scharnhorst reforms of the early nineteenth century.

Under Albrecht von Roon, the army sought to reduce rigidity and encourage independence of thought and action. A cabinet order of 16 December 1858, later called the "Magna Charta of Independence" warned against premature intervention by superiors. Prince Frederick Charles of Prussia wrote that the Prussian officer corps displayed an independence from above that he considered unusual among European armies. The wars of German unification (1864, 1866 and 1870–71) were seen as a test and observers noted junior officers acting without waiting for orders, sometime compensating for errors by higher commanders. The record however was uneven. Some commanders had their initiative suppressed by superior, and willingness to grant independence was not universal even under Moltke. During the Austro-Prussian War of 1866, Citino describes subordinate commanders departing from Moltke's intentions , including Frederick Charles of the First Army, who acted on his own initiative at Battle of Königgrätz ina way that nearly proved costly before the Crown Prince's army arrived.

=== Debate and codification ===
Late 19th century critics, including Wilhelm von Scherff and Albert von Boguslawski, feared that wide latitude would erode discipline and cohesion given the complexity of infantry attacks. The army's 1888 field regulations committed it to the principal originally proposed by Roon, but the debate continued. According to Leistenschneider, it was only after the experiences of the Second Boer War and the Russo-Japanese War, which the Germans studied closely that the concept prevailed in the theoretical debate and was incorporated in the into the 1906 drill regulations.

=== First World War ===
More research is needed on the role the concept played during German operations in WWI. One study suggests that the demands of trench warfare reduced its practice from 1917 onwards. Contemporary infiltration tactics also relied on decentralised initiative at small-unit level.

=== Interwar period and the Second World War ===
The German Army's 1933 manual Truppenführung reflected the emphasis on leadership qualities such as boldness and determination and treated passively as a graver fault than incorrect decision. In the interwar period, German military periodicals debated whether radio communications, by reducing friction between levels of command, lessened the need for independence. Siggs study of three German divisions in WWII found that independent action at the tactical was the exception rather than rule, with improved communication and a culture of leading from the front allowing higher commanders to supervise subordinates closely. A 1944 training document put deviation from orders at about 5%, against 95% adherence. At the operational level Sigg found a stronger tendency among senior officers to act beyond the parameters of their orders, which he attributed in part to ambition, rivalry and resentment of higher authority.

Stahel's own research on the panzer generals is broadly consisted with this picture. Forward command and the devolution of responsibility also exposed officers to danger. Stahel sites the 20th panzer Division's officer casualties of about 50% in its infantry brigades five weeks in to Operation Barbarossa. A 1942 US War Department analysis of the 1939 Invasion to Poland credited the German army's pre-war emphasis on initiative of commanders at all levels as a reason commanders were able to carry out their missions with little interference from above.

=== Bundeswehr ===
In the postwar Bundeswehr, Führen mit Auftrag is connected with concept of Innere Führung. Sigg argues that the Bundeswehr regards it as the correct leadership principals largely because it fits the image of the "citizen in uniform", whereas for the pre-1945 army it was justified on functional grounds of military effectiveness.

== Adoption by other armies ==
=== United States ===
Muth argues that 19th century American observers of European armies missed German debate on the concept and the US Army's officer education did not foster the necessary command culture. He identifies the infantry school at Fort Benning under George C. Marshall as the one US institution that came close to the German approach. From the 1980s, US doctrine increasingly adopted the language of mission command. The Army's 2003 manual: ''Mission Command: Command and Control of Army Forces'' and the Marines corps' 1996 ''Command and Control'' are examples. A 2012 white paper from the Chairman of the Joint Chiefs of Staff set out three principles for joint forces: commander's intent, mission type orders and decentralised execution. Army doctrine defines mission command as the exercise of authority and direction by the commander using mission orders to enable disciplined initiative within the commander's intent. Its 2012 edition listed six principles principles (build cohesive teams through mutual trust, create shared understanding, provide a clear commander's intent, exercise disciplined initiative, use mission orders, and accept prudent risk), and the 2019 edition lists seven, adding competence.

=== Canada, the United Kingdom and others ===
Canadian and British Army doctrine documents of the 1990s and 2000s likewise advocate mission command. Stewart has argued that the approach is advocated more consistently than its practiced. The Australian Army borrowed from the German tradition in the 1990's, through the American and British advocates. Shamir's comparative study of the US, British and Israeli armies examines how each organisation's culture shaped its pursuit of mission.

== Etymology ==
When it is translated to English, the German word, which has never been part of the official German military's lexicon, loses some of its effect. The German word does not describe a set of tactics per se, and it certainly neither is limited to the tactical level of operations nor a method of leadership. However, it encapsulates a style of command: "tactics focused on accomplishing the task/mission", as opposed to Befehlstaktik ("tactics focused on executing a set of orders"). Direct orders are an exception in the German military, and "tasks" are the standard instrument of leadership from the high command down to the squad level.

Many other terms were used to denote concepts of mission-type tactics in Germany between 1891 and 1914, a few being Freies Verfahren (lit. 'free method'), Freie Taktik (lit. 'free tactics'), Auftragsverfahren (lit. 'mission method'), Individualverfahren (lit. 'individual method') and Initiativverfahren (lit. 'initiative method'). A discussion of the evolution of the terminology is given by Stephan Leistenschneider.

== Origins ==
Napoleon had fought a continual battle of movement. Throughout his career, at least until the Peninsular War, he demonstrated his ability to defeat any enemy by the greater flexibility of his units and through better deployment. The fact that French troops were mainly composed of conscripts indicates that it was Napoleon's organization of the troops, rather than their professional training, that gave the French an overall advantage.

After the severe defeat of the Prussians by Napoleon in 1806 in the Battle of Jena-Auerstedt, the Prussian military rethought their military approach and aimed to build a college of military capability, the General Staff, as a systemic counter to the individual genius that had so soundly beaten them. The Prussian Army thus aimed to institutionalize excellence, to build in its structure a flexibility akin to Napoleon's. To enable this flexibility, the Prussian Army also sought to inculcate in General Staff Officers the ability to ensure that each military unit understood and executed its mission.

One of the earliest alleged uses of Auftragstaktik was at the Battle of Königgrätz in the Austro-Prussian War. Auftragstaktik is one of the tools often claimed to have given the Prussians their decisive victory. That claim is difficult to accept since no appreciation of Auftragstaktik had been accepted officially. The Bohemian Campaign could have been an example of its use only if having subordinate commanders that ignore directives from superiors, who march southward when ordered to march east and treat their senior commanders with barely concealed contempt can truly be described as a form of "flexible command". Most of the Prussian commanders, particularly Frederick Charles of the 1st Prussian Army, had no real understanding of Moltke the Elder's strategy. Frederick Charles did not much like the parts that he understood, was uncooperative under Moltke's orders, and disobeyed him several times. During the battle and without authorisation, he acted on his own initiative and launched a premature attack on the Austrian Army, which nearly ended in disaster. If Crown Prince Frederick William had arrived only an hour later, the battle might have been decisively lost.

After the First World War, the monitoring, coaching and training role built a level of trust, competency and understanding across the whole 4,000-strong German post-war officer corps that made a new level of excellence possible.

Excellence in this case is derived in part from the tradition of Gerhard von Scharnhorst, Carl von Clausewitz and Helmuth von Moltke and was based upon the premise that hard-and-fast rules had no place in the environment of war, which was the realm of human emotion, friction, chance and uncertainty. Moltke is considered one of the principal advocates of independent thinking and acting among his subordinates:

Diverse are the situations under which an officer has to act on the basis of his own view of the situation. It would be wrong if he had to wait for orders at times when no orders can be given. But most productive are his actions when he acts within the framework of his senior commander's intent.

Under the Auftragstaktik system, the selection of combat formations, as well as their route and rate of advance, was based upon a unit's mission, the terrain and the enemy's disposition, something Napoleon was renowned for doing. Building a high level of trust, competency and understanding is crucial for the success of such a doctrine. The freedoms that might imply have challenged many armies' views of military discipline, including that of the Prussian Army.

== See also ==
- Blitzkrieg, lightning warfare of World War II
- Infiltration tactics, precursor to blitzkrieg in World War I
- War of manoeuvre, the doctrine behind blitzkrieg, also known as Bewegungskrieg.
- Command and obedience in the Bundeswehr
- Distributed operations
- Intent (military)
- Command by negation
- Mosaic defence strategy

== External links and further reading ==
- Generals Balck And Von Mellenthin On Tactics: Implications For NATO Military Doctrine a 1980 paper where the concept of the Auftragstaktik is explained and demonstrated.
- Werner Widder (de): Auftragstaktik and Innere Führung. Trademarks of German Generalship. In: Military Review (2002), September–October, p. 3–9
- Manuel de Landa, War in the Age of Intelligent Machines, 1991.
- von Luck, Hans. Panzer Commander. Cassell Military, 1991. Available online, accessed 4 October 2005.
- "Auftragstaktik, or Directive Control, in Joint and Combined Operations." Parameters, US Army War College Quarterly. Autumn 1999, Vol. XXIX, No. 3. David M. Keithly and Stephen P. Ferris. Available online, accessed 11 November 2005.
- Gerhard Muhm: German Tactics in the Italian Campaign.
- Gerhard Muhm, "La tattica tedesca nella campagna d'Italia," in Linea gotica avamposto dei Balcani, a cura di Amedeo Montemaggi – Edizioni Civitas, Roma 1993.
- Condell, Bruce; Zabecki, David T., eds. (2001). On the German Art of War: Truppenführung. Foreword by James S. Corum. Boulder, Colorado: Lynne Rienner Publishers. ISBN 9781555879969. LCCN 2001019798. OCLC 46704038. Originally published in German as Heeresdienstvorschrift 300: Part 1 (1933) and Part 2 (1934)..
- Jeremy Tozer, Leading Through Leaders, 2012, Kogan Page, London.
- Stephen Bungay, The Art of Action, 2011, Nicholas Brealey, London.
