= Helmuth von Moltke the Elder =

German field marshal (1800–1891)

Generalfeldmarschall Graf Helmuth von Moltke the Elder
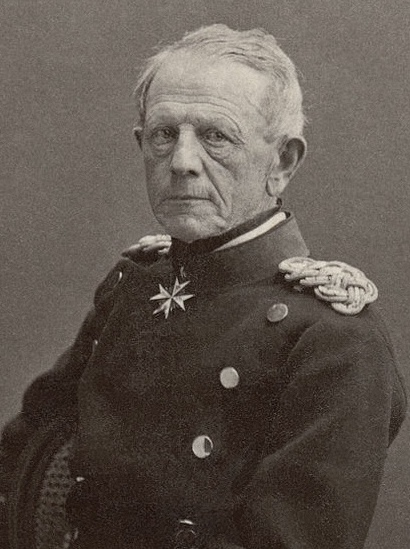
- Graf von Moltke, c. 1870s

1st Chief of the German General Staff
- In office 18 January 1871 – 10 August 1888
- Monarchs: Wilhelm I; Frederick III; Wilhelm II
- Chancellor: Otto von Bismarck
- Preceded by: Position established
- Succeeded by: Alfred von Waldersee

11th Chief of the Prussian General Staff
- In office 7 October 1857 – 18 January 1871
- Monarch: Wilhelm I
- Minister President: Otto von Bismarck
- Minister of War of Prussia: Albrecht von Roon
- Preceded by: Karl von Reyher
- Succeeded by: Himself (as Chief of the German General Staff)

Personal details
- Born: 26 October 1800 Parchim, Mecklenburg-Schwerin, Holy Roman Empire
- Died: 24 April 1891 (aged 90) Berlin, Prussia, German Empire
- Spouse: Marie Burt (m. 1842; died 1868)
- Relatives: Helmuth von Moltke the Younger (nephew)
- Awards: see below
- Nickname(s): Moltke the Elder (Moltke der Ältere); The Great Taciturn (Der große Schweiger)

Military service
- Allegiance: Kingdom of Prussia; German Empire; Denmark; Ottoman Empire
- Branch/service: Prussian Army
- Years of service: 1819–1888
- Rank: Second lieutenant (Danish Army); Generalfeldmarschall (German Army)
- Battles/wars: Tree-like list: Mir Muhammad Rebellion; Second Egyptian–Ottoman War; Battle of Nezib; Second Schleswig War; Austro-Prussian War; Battle of Langensalza; Battle of Königgrätz; Franco-Prussian War; Battle of Gravelotte; Battle of Sedan; Siege of Paris
- Helmuth von Moltke's voice Helmuth von Moltke reciting Shakespeare's Hamlet, Act 1, Scene 3, "Dein Ohr leih Jedem, Wen’gen deine Stimme" – Give every man thy ear but few thy voice. (recorded Oct 1889)

Graf Helmuth Karl Bernhard von Moltke (German: [ˈhɛlmuːt fɔn ˈmɔltkə]; 26 October 1800 – 24 April 1891) was a Prussian Generalfeldmarschall. The chief of staff of the Prussian Army for thirty years, he is regarded as the creator of a new, more modern method of directing armies in the field and one of the finest military minds of his generation. He commanded troops in the Middle-East and then in Europe during the Second Schleswig War, Austro-Prussian War, and Franco-Prussian War. He is described as embodying "Prussian military organization and tactical genius". He was fascinated with railways and pioneered their military use.

He is often referred to as Moltke the Elder to distinguish him from his nephew Helmuth von Moltke the Younger (Helmuth Johann Ludwig von Moltke), who commanded the German army at the outbreak of the First World War. He is notably the earliest-born human whose recorded voice is preserved, being born in the year 1800. He made four recordings; two that were recorded in October 1889 are preserved to this day.

== Early life ==
Moltke was born in Parchim, Mecklenburg-Schwerin, son of Generalleutnant Friedrich Philipp Victor von Moltke (1768–1845), a German in Danish service. In 1805, his father settled in Holstein (then a possession of the King of Denmark). But the next year he was left impoverished when during the War of the Fourth Coalition of 1806–1807 French troops burned his country house and plundered his townhouse in Lübeck, where his wife and children were. At nine the younger Moltke was sent as a boarder to Hohenfelde in Holstein, and at age twelve went to the Royal Danish Military Academy at Copenhagen, being destined for the Danish army and court. In 1818 he became a page to King Frederick VI of Denmark and a second lieutenant in the Oldenburg Infantry Regiment. At twenty-one, Moltke decided to leave Denmark and enter the Prussian army, despite the loss of seniority. In 1822 he became a second lieutenant in the 8th Infantry Regiment stationed at Frankfurt an der Oder. At twenty-three he was allowed to enter the general war school (later called the Prussian Military Academy), where he studied the full three years, graduating in 1826.

== Military career ==
=== Early career ===
==== As a young officer ====
For a year Moltke had charge of a cadet school at Frankfurt an der Oder, then he was for three years employed on the military survey in Silesia and Posen. In 1832 he was seconded for service on the general staff at Berlin, to which he was transferred in 1833 on promotion to first lieutenant. He was at this time regarded as a brilliant officer by his superiors, including Prince William, then a lieutenant-general.

Moltke was well received at court and in the best society of Berlin. His tastes inclined him to literature, to historical study, and to travel. In 1827 he published a short romance, The Two Friends. In 1831 he wrote an essay entitled Holland and Belgium in their Mutual Relations, from their Separation under Philip II to their Reunion under William I. A year later he wrote An Account of the Internal Circumstances and Social Conditions of Poland, a study based both on reading and on personal observation of Polish life and character.

He was fluent in English and a talented writer in German; in 1832 he was contracted to translate Gibbon's The History of the Decline and Fall of the Roman Empire into German, for which he was to receive 75 marks, his object being to earn the money to buy a horse. In eighteen months he had finished nine volumes out of twelve but the publisher failed to produce the book and Moltke never received more than 25 marks.

==== Service with the Ottoman Empire ====
In 1835, on his promotion to captain, Moltke obtained six months' leave to travel in southeast Europe. After a short stay in Constantinople, he was asked by the Sultan Mahmud II to help modernize the Ottoman Empire's army and with permission from Berlin he accepted the offer. He remained for two years at Constantinople, learned Turkish, and surveyed the city of Constantinople, the Bosporus and the Dardanelles. He travelled through Wallachia, Bulgaria and Rumelia, making many other journeys on both sides of the Straits.

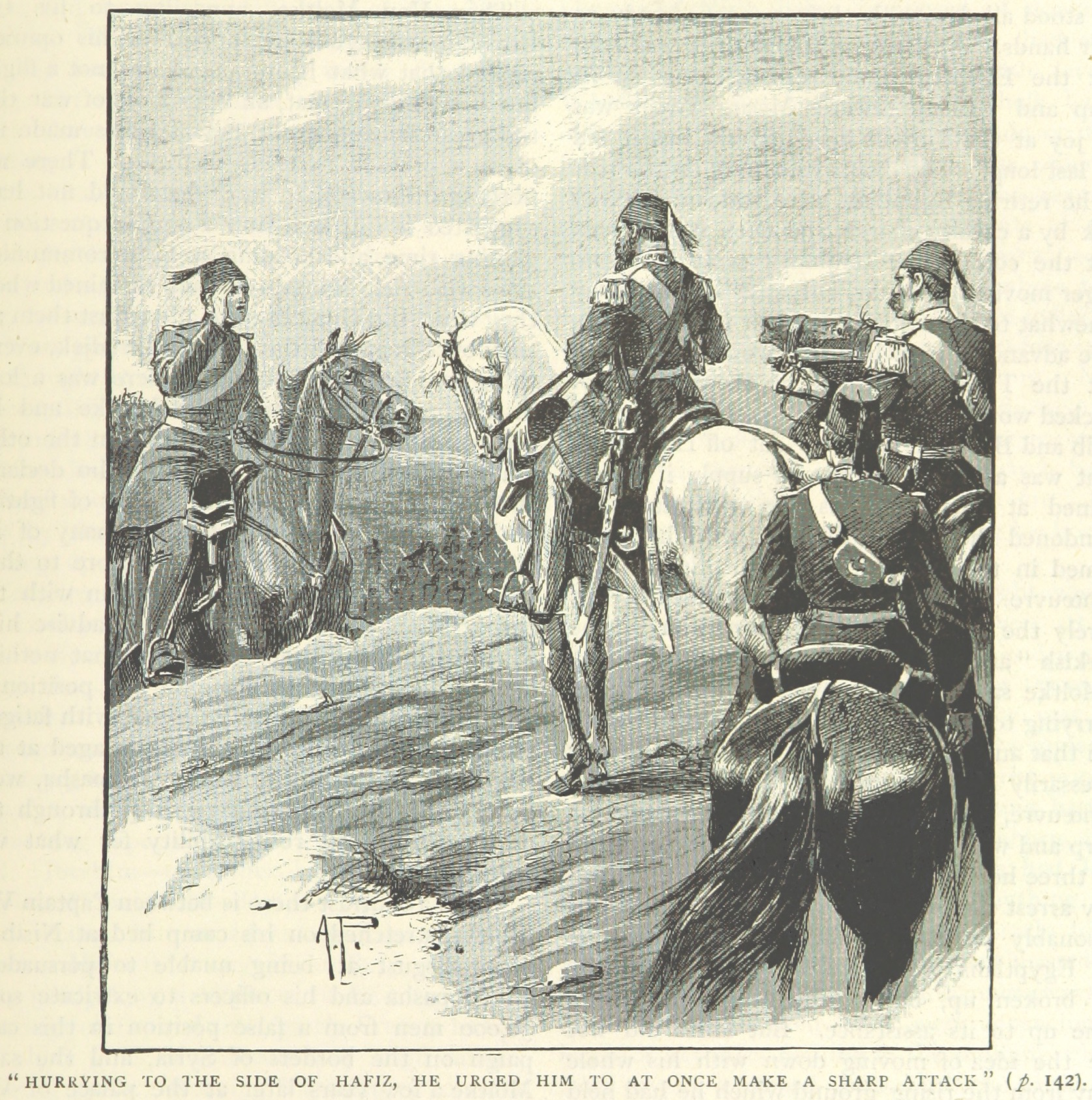
Moltke (left) advising Ottoman commander Hafiz Pasha at Nezib

In 1838, Moltke was sent as an adviser to the Ottoman general commanding the troops in Anatolia, who was to carry on the Egyptian–Ottoman War (1839–1841) against Muhammad Ali of Egypt. During the summer Moltke made extensive reconnaissances and surveys, riding several thousand miles in the course of his journey. He navigated the rapids of the Euphrates and visited and mapped many parts of the Ottoman Empire. In 1839 the army moved south to fight the Egyptians but upon their approach, the general refused to listen to Moltke's advice. Moltke resigned his post of staff officer and took charge of the artillery. In the Battle of Nezib on 24 June 1839, the Ottoman Army was beaten, but Moltke's actions were well-regarded.

Thus on 7 November 1839, he received the Pour le Mérite from Prussia. With great difficulty, Moltke made his way back to the Black Sea, and thence to Constantinople. His patron, Sultan Mahmud II, was dead, so he returned to Berlin, broken in health, in December 1839.

Once home Moltke published some of the letters he had written as Letters on Conditions and Events in Turkey in the Years 1835 to 1839. This book was well received at the time. Early the next year he married a young English woman, Maria Bertha Helena Burt, whose father John Heyliger Burt had married Moltke's sister Augusta. It was a happy union, though there were no children. In 1840, Moltke had been appointed to the staff of the IV Corps, which was under the command of Prince Charles of Prussia, stationed at Berlin. He published his maps of Constantinople, and, jointly with other German travellers, a new map of Asia Minor and a memoir on the geography of that region.

He became interested in railroads and he was one of the first directors of the Hamburg–Berlin railway. Moltke also paid close attention to the tactical and operational implications of rifled weapons. In 1843 he published the article "What Considerations should determine the Choice of the Course of Railways?" Even before Germany began constructing its first railroad he had noticed their military potential and he urged the general staff to support railway construction for mobilisation and supply. He spent all of his savings on investments into Prussian railroad ventures which made him a considerable amount of wealth. During his later years in the great general staff he would add a Railways Department, which did not have the task of planning military campaigns like many of the other departments, but managed the military use of railways.

In 1845, Moltke published The Russo-Turkish Campaign in Europe, 1828–1829, which was well received in military circles. In the same year, he served in Rome as personal adjutant to Prince Henry of Prussia, which allowed him to create another map of the Eternal City (published in 1852). In 1848, after a brief return to the General Staff in Berlin, he became Chief of the Staff of the 4th Corps, of which the headquarters was then at Magdeburg. There he remained for seven years, during which he rose to Lieutenant Colonel and Colonel. In 1855, Moltke served as a personal aide and mentor to Prince Frederick William (later Emperor Frederick III) as Generalmajor. He accompanied the prince to England for the prince's marriage, as well as to Paris and Saint Petersburg for the coronation of Alexander II of Russia.

=== In Prussia ===
==== Chief of the Prussian General Staff and Great General staff ====
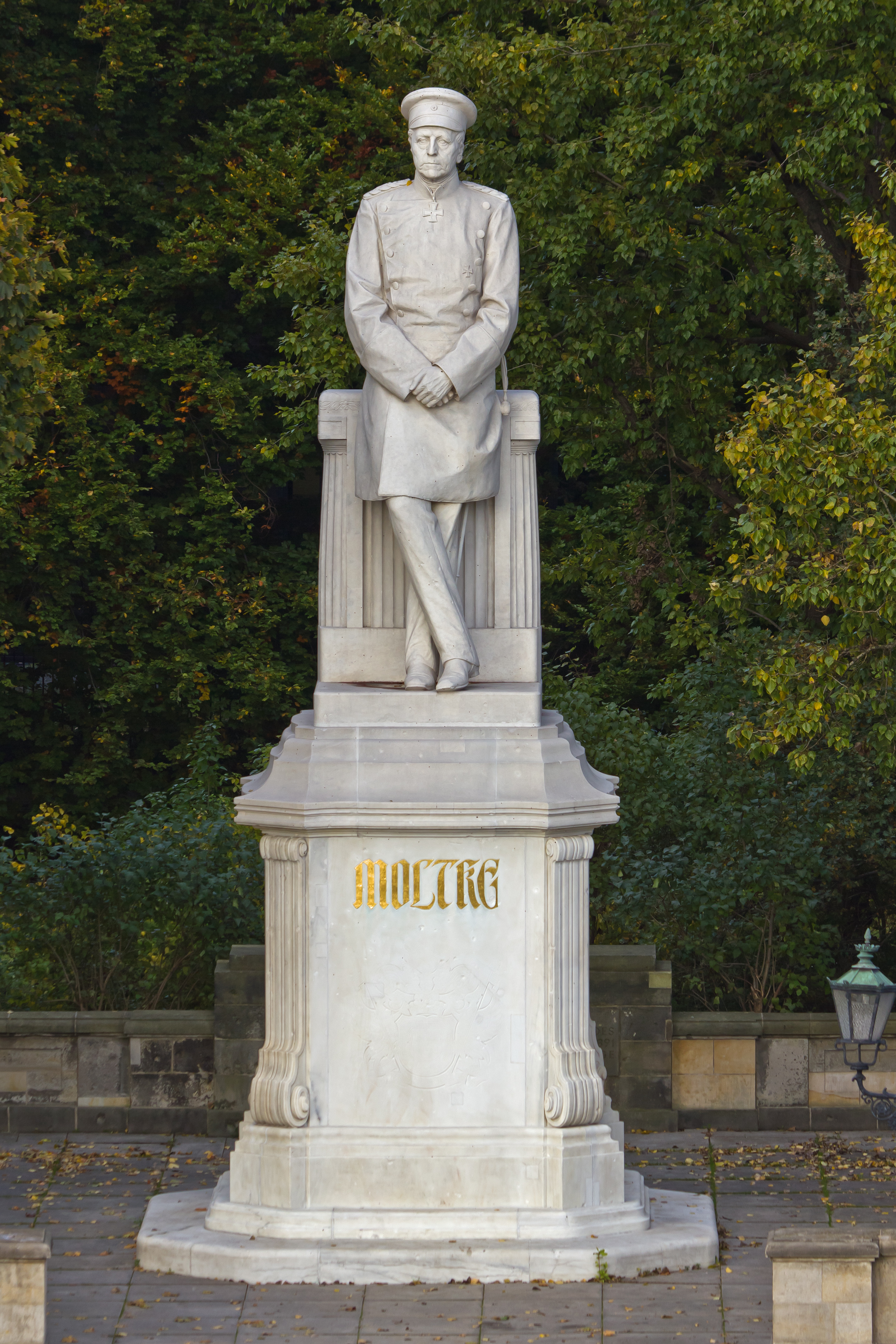
Statue of Helmuth von Moltke the Elder, near the Berlin Victory Column in the Tiergarten, Berlin, by Joseph Uphues

On the suggestion of Edwin von Manteuffel, the new king appointed Moltke as Chief of the Prussian General Staff on 29 October 1857. He would hold the position for the next 30 years (though after the establishment of the German Empire, the Prussian General Staff's title was changed to "Great General Staff", as it would have direction of the various German armies during war.) As soon as he gained the position he went to work making changes to the strategic and tactical methods of the Prussian army: changes in armament and means of communication; changes in the training of staff officers (such as instituting staff rides); and changes in the method for the mobilization of the army. He also instituted a formal study of European politics in connection with the plans for campaigns which might become necessary. In short, he rapidly put into place the features of a modern general staff. By 1860, his reforms were completed.

In 1859, the Austro-Sardinian War in Italy caused the mobilization of the Prussian army, though it did not fight. After the mobilization, the army was reorganized and its strength was nearly doubled. The reorganization was the work not of Moltke but of the Prince Regent, William, and the Minister of War, Albrecht von Roon. Moltke watched the Italian campaign closely and wrote a history of it in 1862. In an act that was yet another first in military affairs, this history was attributed on the title page to the historical division of the Prussian staff.

In 1860, "[Moltke] added a Railway Section to the military council. A contemporary would write that von Moltke never made an important decision without consulting the German railway timetables." Moltke had been following developments relating to the railroad ever since his return from Egypt, at which time he wrote that: “Every new railway development is a military benefit, and for national defence, it is far more profitable to spend a few million on completing our railways than on new fortresses.”

In December 1862, Moltke was asked for an opinion on the military aspect of the quarrel with Denmark. He thought the difficulty would be to bring the war to an end, as the Danish army would, if possible, retire to the islands, where, as the Danes had the command of the sea, it could not be attacked. He sketched a plan for turning the flank of the Danish army before the attack upon its position in front of Schleswig. He suggested that by this means its retreat might be cut off.

==== War with Denmark ====
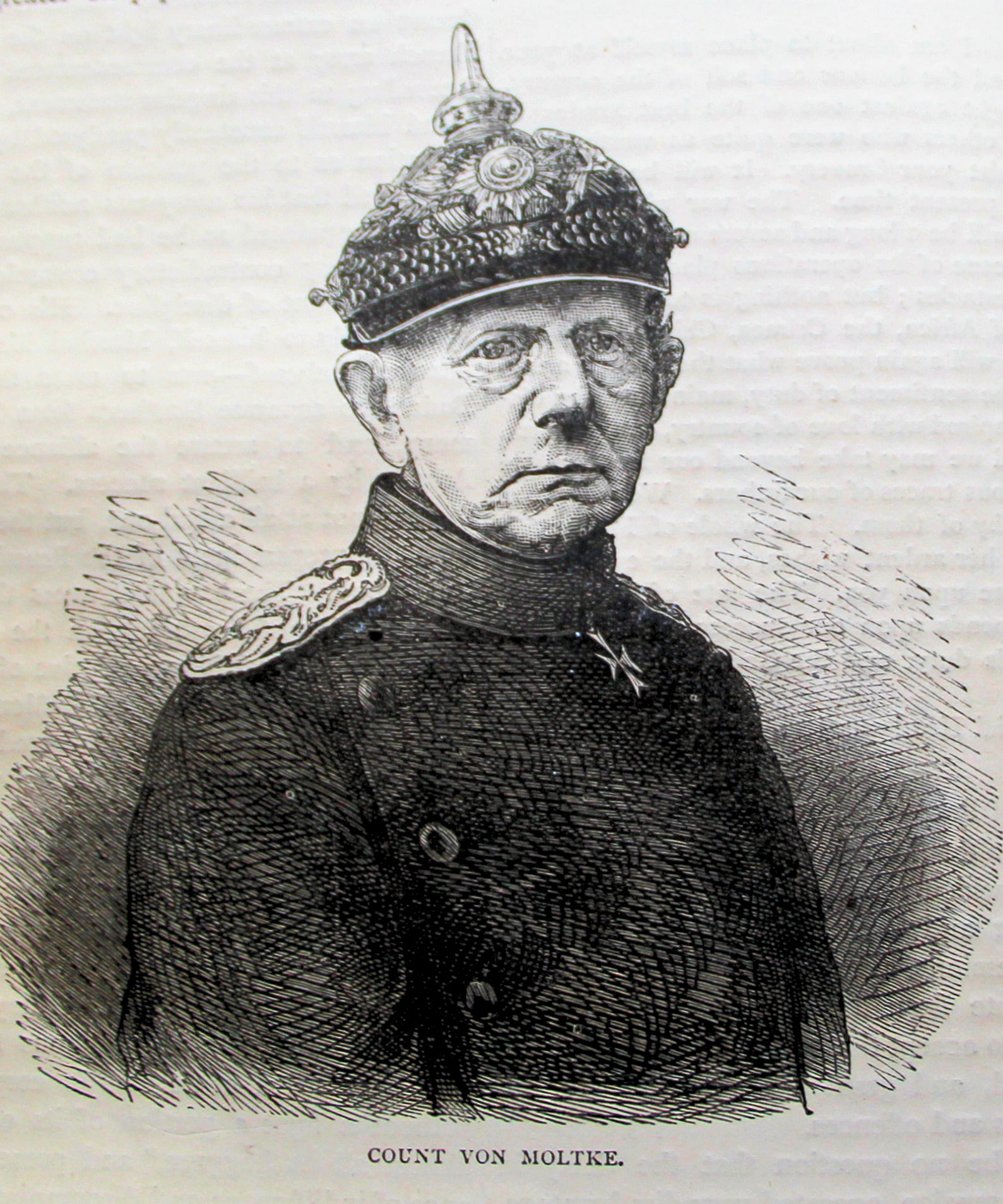
Sketch of Helmuth von Moltke

When the Second Schleswig War began in February 1864, Moltke was not sent with the Prussian forces but kept at Berlin. His war plan was mismanaged, and the Danish army escaped to the fortresses of Dybbøl and Fredericia, each of which commanded a retreat across a strait to an island. Dybbøl and Fredericia were besieged, Dybbøl taken by storm, and Fredericia abandoned by the Danes without assault – but the war showed no signs of ending. The Danish army was safe on the islands of Als and Funen.

On 30 April 1864, Moltke was sent to be chief of the staff for the allied (German) forces. He and Friedrich Graf von Wrangel planned landing on Als or Funen. On June 29, battalions (part of Herwarth von Bittenfeld's army corps) crossed to Als in boats, landed while under fire from the Danish batteries, and quickly seized the whole island as far as the Kekenis peninsula. Days later, Eduard Vogel von Falckenstein's corps crossed the Limfjord and occupied the remaining parts of Jutland while the Austrians seized the various islands. The Danish government, dejected by the course of the war, ended the war in defeat by signing the Treaty of Vienna.

===== Moltke's theory of war =====
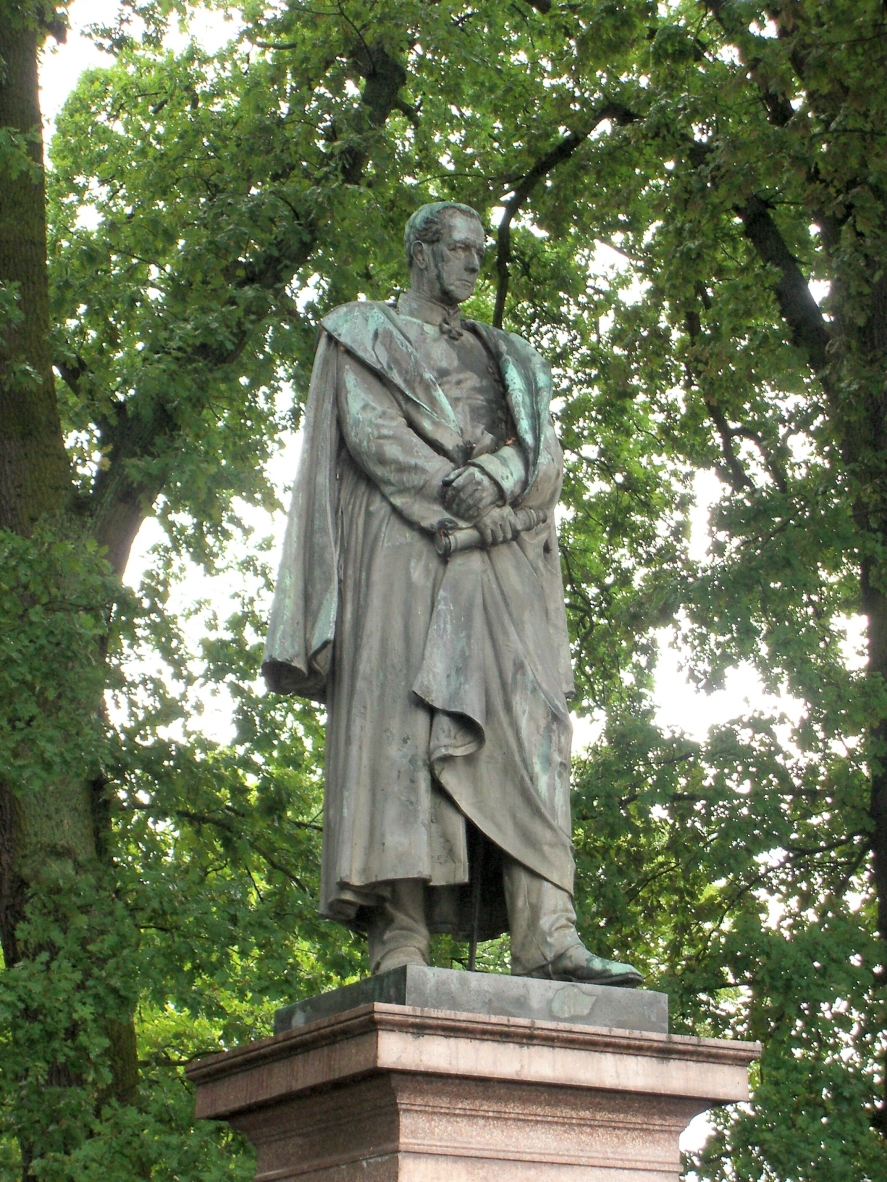
Statue in Parchim, Moltke's birthplace

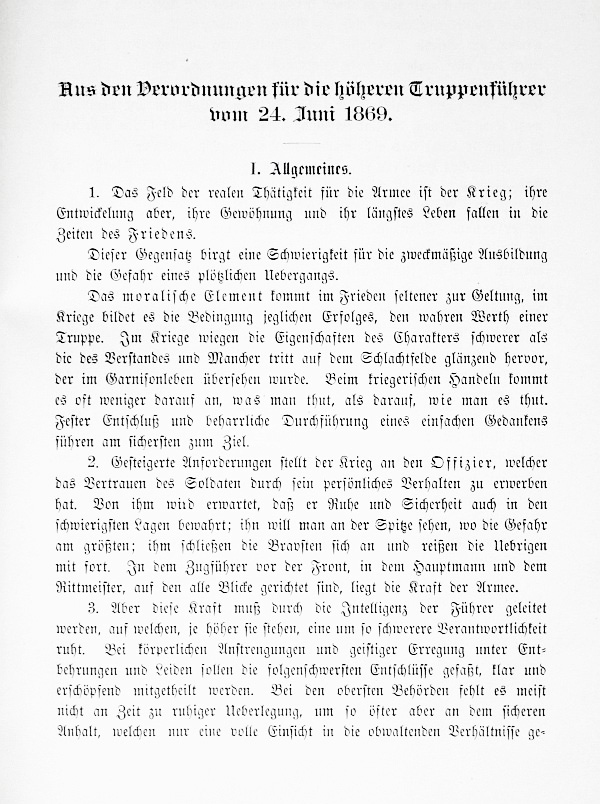
First page of von Moltke's Instructions for Large Unit Commanders, 1869

In contrast to Antoine-Henri Jomini, who expounded a system of rules, Moltke was a disciple of Carl von Clausewitz and regarded strategy as a practical art of adapting means to ends. He had developed the methods of Napoleon in accordance with altered conditions of his age, was the first to realize the great defensive power of modern firearms, and realized that an enveloping attack had become more formidable than an attempt to pierce an enemy's front.

He developed the idea of Clausewitz and said "The purpose of war is to carry out the policy of the government with arms". He emphasized the autonomy of war. This brought conflicts with Otto von Bismarck. One of Moltke's characteristic strategies, seen in all his plans for war with Russia and France, was what has been called the offensive–defensive strategy, manoeuvring his army to cut the lines of communication of the enemy force and then dig in and defeat the enemy force trying to re-establish its lines of communication in a defensive action. Moltke had pondered the tactics of Napoleon at the Battle of Bautzen, when the emperor brought up Ney's corps, coming from a great distance, against the flank of the allies, rather than to unite it with his own force before the battle; he had also drawn this conclusion from the combined action of the allies at the Battle of Waterloo. Moltke realized that the increase in firepower reduced the risk a defender ran in splitting his forces, while the increase in the size of armies made outflanking manoeuvres more practical.

Moltke had worked out the conditions of the march and supply of an army. Only one army corps could be moved along one road in one day; to put two or three corps on the same road meant that the rear corps could not be made use of in a battle at the front. Several corps stationed close together in a small area could not be fed for more than a day or two. He believed that the essence of strategy lay in arrangements for the separation of the corps for marching and their concentration in time for battle. To make a large army manageable, it must be broken up into separate armies or groups of corps, each group under a commander authorized to regulate its movements and actions subject to the instructions of the commander-in-chief regarding the direction and purpose of its operations.

Moltke also realized that the expansion in the size of armies since the 1820s made it impossible to exercise detailed control over the entire force (as Napoleon or Wellington had done in battle). Subordinates would have to use initiative and independent judgment for the forces to be effective in battle. Campaign and battle plans should encourage and take advantage of the decentralization that would be necessary in any case. In this new concept, commanders of distant detachments were required to exercise initiative in their decision-making and Moltke emphasized the benefits of developing officers who could do this within the limits of the senior commander's intent. He accomplished this by means of Mission-type tactics (directives stating his intentions) rather than detailed orders and he was willing to accept deviations from a directive provided that it was within the general framework of the mission. Moltke held this view firmly and it later became a fundamental of all German military theory, especially for the field manual Truppenführung.

Moltke's thesis was that military strategy had to be understood as a system of options since it was possible to plan only the beginning of a military operation. As a result, he considered the main task of military leaders to consist in the extensive preparation of all possible outcomes. His thesis can be summed up by two statements, one famous and one less so, translated into English as "No plan of operations extends with certainty beyond the first encounter with the enemy's main strength" (or "no plan survives first contact with the enemy") and "Strategy is a system of expedients". Right before the Austro-Prussian War, Moltke was promoted to General of the Infantry.

==== Austro-Prussian War ====
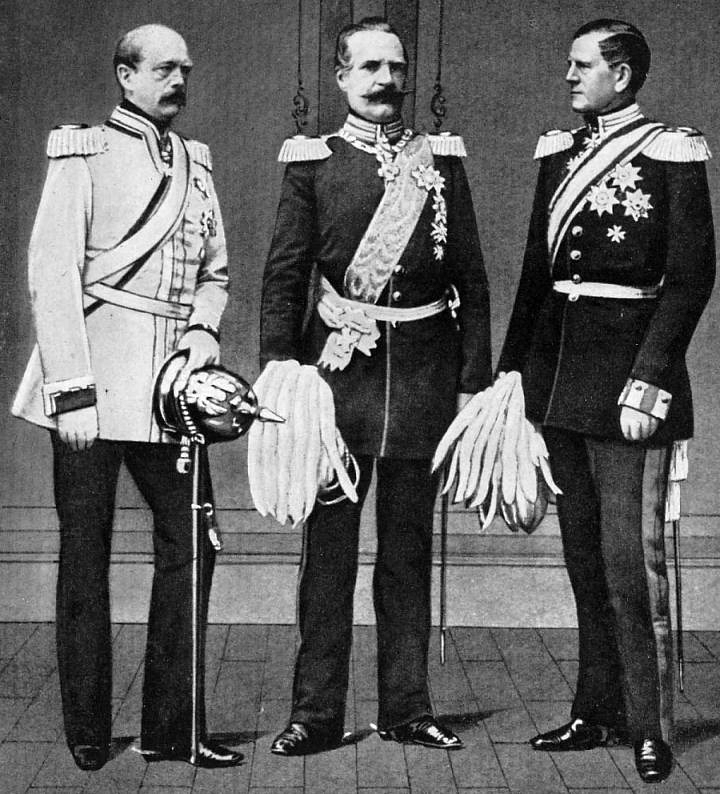
Bismarck, Roon, Moltke, three leaders of Prussia in the 1860s. Drawing with three cut-out heads.

Moltke planned and led the military operations during the Austro-Prussian War of 1866. In the strategy for the war, the main points are as follows. First Moltke demonstrated a concentration of effort. There were two enemy groups opposing the Prussians, the Austro-Saxon armies, 270,000 and their allied North and South German armies, some 120,000 strong. The Prussian forces were smaller by some 60,000 but Moltke was determined to be superior at the decisive point. Moltke divided the Prussian Army into three field armies: the First Army, the Second Army, and the Army of the Elbe. The First Army consisted of three army corps, a cavalry corps of six brigades, and 300 guns, gathering near Görlitz (Prince Friedrich Karl). The Second Army consisted of four army corps, a cavalry division, and 336 guns, near Neisse (Crown Prince Frederick William). The Army of the Elbe consisted of three divisions, two cavalry brigades, and 144 guns in the cantonments around Torgau (General Karl von Bittenfeld). Besides the three field armies, three more divisions were stationed at Altona (General Edwin von Manteuffel), one at Minden (General Eduard von Falckenstein), and one at Wetzlar (General Gustav von Beyer). The three field armies, placed to attack Austria, consisted of some 278,000 men, leaving just 48,000 men remaining to defend against Austria's German allies. Those 48,000, led by Falckenstein, captured the Hanoverian Army in less than two weeks and then attacked and drove away the south German forces.

In dealing with the Austrian and Saxon armies, the difficulty was to have the Prussian army ready first. This was not easy, as the king would not mobilize until after the Austrians. Moltke's railway knowledge helped him to save time. Five railway lines led from the various Prussian provinces to a series of points on the southern frontier. By employing all these railways at once, Moltke had all his army corps moved simultaneously from their peacetime garrisons to the frontier.

After the Prussian armies marched into Saxony, the Saxon army retreated into Bohemia. Moltke had two Prussian armies about 100 mi (160 km) apart. The problem was how to bring them together to catch the Austrian army between them like the French at Waterloo between Wellington and Blücher. He determined to bring his two armies together by directing each of them to advance towards Gitschin. On June 22, 1866, Moltke told the two princes that Gitschin was the desirable point for the juncture of the two armies. He foresaw that the march of the Crown Prince would probably bring him into collision with a portion of the Austrian army. Prince Friedrich Karl sent the 3rd Division to Gitschin; but the Crown Prince had 100,000 men, and it was not likely that the Austrians could have a stronger force. When Friedrich Karl ordered further attacks, straining his own supply lines, Moltke inferred that the prince was trying to take Prague by himself.

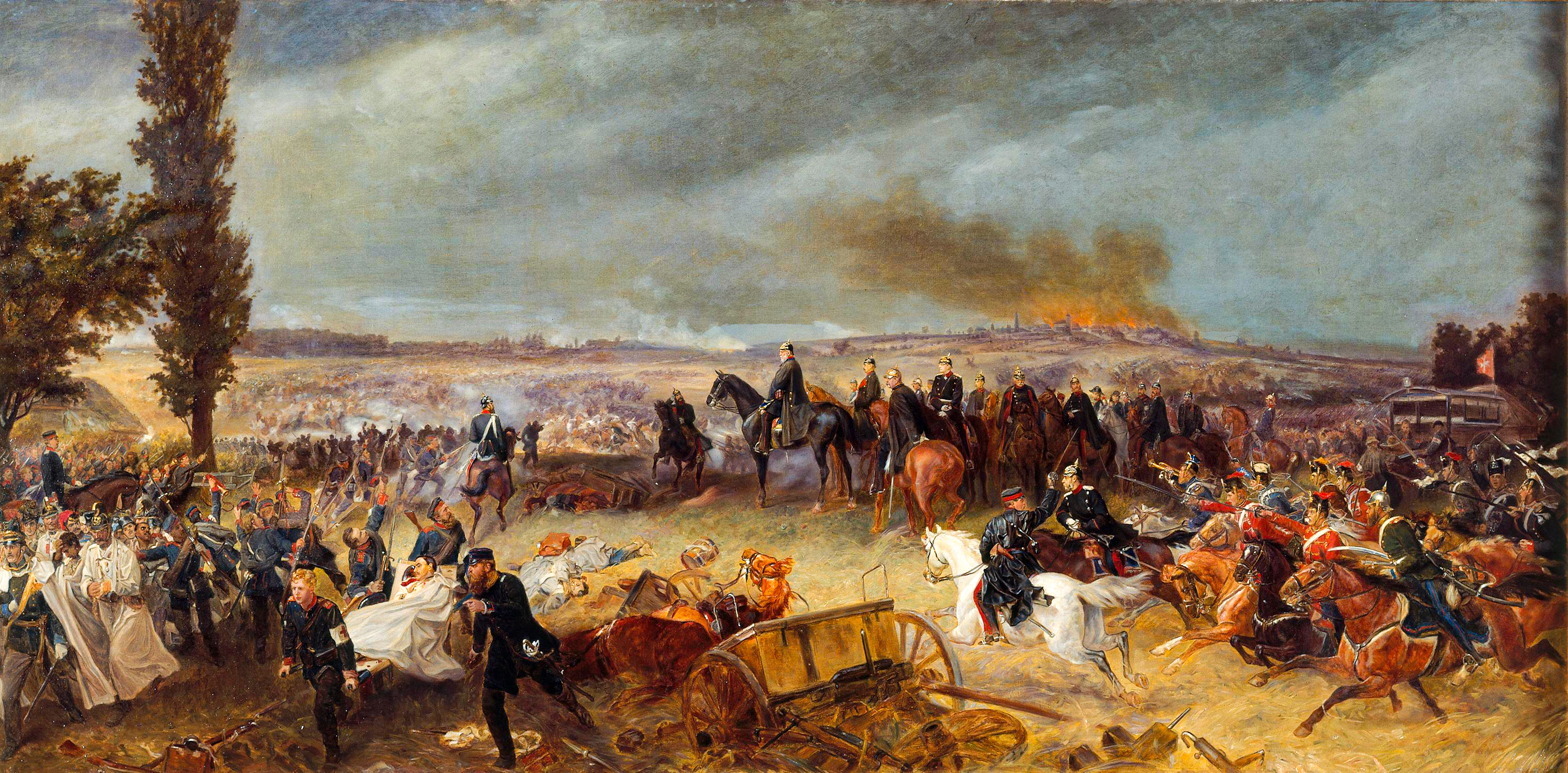
King Wilhelm I on a black horse with his suite, Bismarck, Moltke, Roon, and others, watching the Battle of Königgrätz

The Austrians, under Ludwig von Benedek, marched faster than Moltke expected, and might have opposed Prince Frederick Charles (the Red Prince) with four or five corps; but Benedek's attention was centred on Crown Prince Frederick William, and his four corps, not under a common command, were beaten in detail. On 1 July Benedek collected his shaken forces into a defensive position in front of Königgrätz. Moltke's two armies were now within a short march of one another and of the enemy. On 3 July they were brought into action, the first army against the Austrian forces and the second against the Austrian right flank. The Austrian army was completely defeated and the campaign and war were won.

Moltke was not quite satisfied with the Battle of Königgrätz. He tried to have the Prussian Army of the Elbe brought up above Königgrätz, so as to prevent the Austrian retreat, but its commanding officer failed to get there in time. He also tried to prevent the Prussian First Army from pushing its attack too hard, hoping in that way to keep the Austrians in their position until their retreat should be cut off by the Crown Prince's army, but this also did not happen. During the negotiations, Otto von Bismarck opposed the king's wish to annex the Kingdom of Saxony and other territory beyond what was actually taken; he feared the active intervention of France. Moltke, however, was confident of beating both the French and Austrians if the French should intervene, and he submitted to Bismarck his plans in case a war against both France and Austria proved necessary. After the peace, the Prussian government voted Moltke the sum of 30,000 marks (equivalent to approximately 225,000 US$ in 2016), with which he bought a 500-hectare estate in Creisau (present-day Krzyżowa), near Schweidnitz (present-day Świdnica) in the Province of Silesia.

In 1867, The Campaign of 1866 in Germany was published. This history was produced under Moltke's supervision and was regarded as quite accurate at the time. In the same year Moltke became a member of Reichstag as a member of the Conservative Party. He frequently spoke on military issues. On 24 December 1868 Moltke's wife died at Berlin. Her remains were buried in a small chapel erected by Moltke as a mausoleum in the park at Creisau.

After the war, Bismarck assessed him as a reliable soldier.

=== Later career ===
==== Franco-Prussian War ====
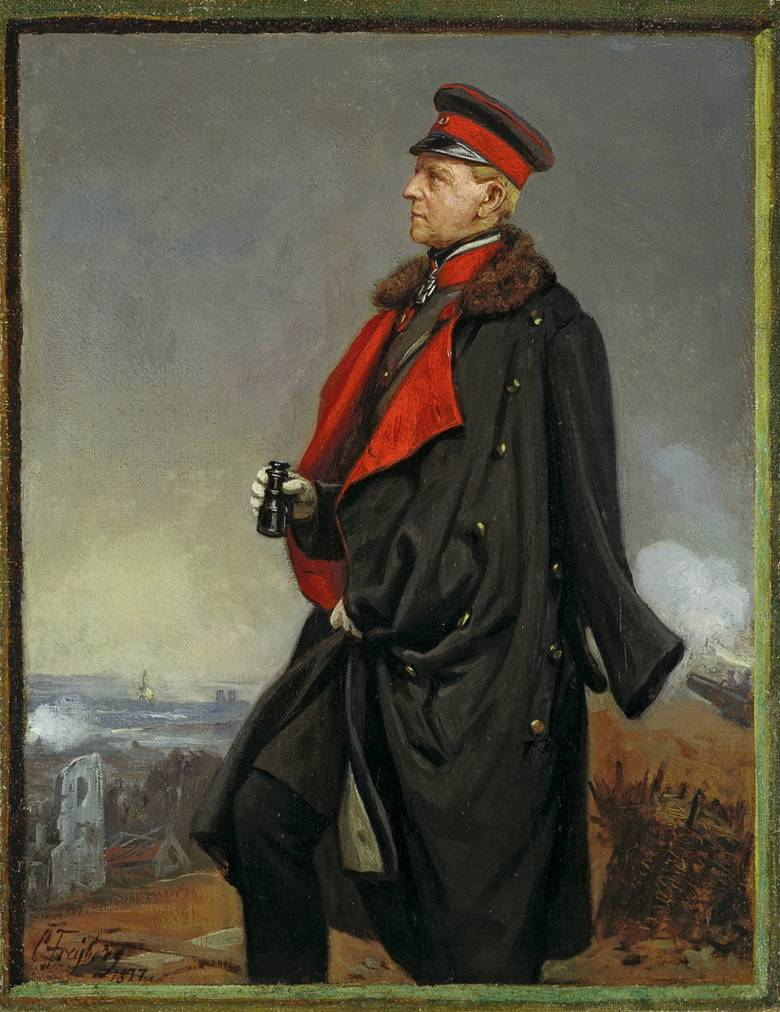
Portrait of Helmuth von Moltke in 1877

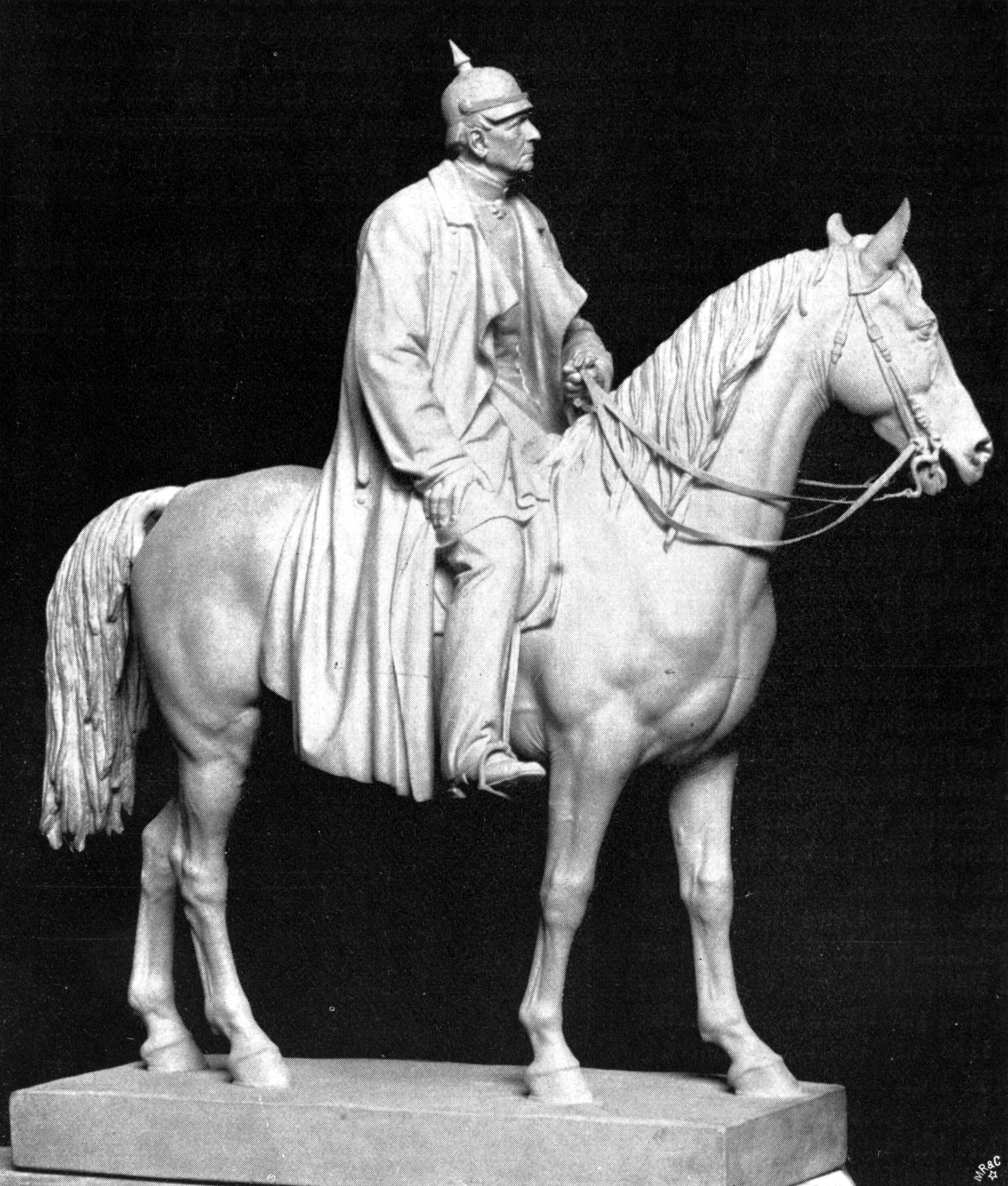
Statue (Leipzig 1888–1946). The statue was torn down after the communists took power.

Moltke again planned and led the Prussian armies in the Franco-Prussian War (1870–71), which paved the way for the creation of the Prussian-led German Empire in 1871. The aspects of such a war had occupied Moltke's attention almost continuously since 1857; documents published after his death show the many times he considered such a war and the best arrangement of the Prussian or German forces for such a campaign. The arrangements for the transport of the army by railway were revised annually to suit the changes in his plans brought about by political conditions and by the growth of the army, as well as by the improvement of the Prussian system of railways.

The successes of 1866 had strengthened Moltke's position, so that when, on 5 July 1870, the order for the mobilization of the Prussian and South German forces was issued, his plans were adopted without dispute. Five days later he was appointed Chief of Staff of the Army for the duration of the war. This gave Moltke the right to issue orders which were equivalent to royal commands.

Moltke's plan was to assemble the whole army south of Mainz, this being one district in which a single army could secure the defence of the whole frontier. If the French disregarded the neutrality of Belgium and Luxembourg, and advanced towards Cologne (or any other point on the Lower Rhine), the German army would be able to strike at their flank. At the same time the Rhine itself, with the fortresses of Koblenz, Cologne and Wesel, would be a serious obstacle in their path. If the French should attempt to invade south Germany, an advance by the Germans up the Rhine river would threaten their communications. Moltke expected that the French would be compelled by the direction of their railways to collect the greater part of their army near Metz, and a smaller portion near Strasbourg.

The German forces were grouped into three armies: the First of 60,000 men under Von Steinmetz, on the Moselle below Trier; the Second of 130,000 men, under Prince Friedrich Karl of Prussia, around Homburg (with a reserve of 60,000 men behind them); and the Third of 130,000 men under the Crown Prince Frederick William, at Landau. Three army corps were held back in north-Eastern Germany, in case Austria-Hungary should make common cause with France. He reported this to the King on 17 April 1870.

Moltke's plan was that the three armies, while advancing, should make a right wheel, so that the First Army on the right would reach the bank of the Moselle opposite Metz, while the Second and Third Armies should push forward, the Third Army to defeat the French force near Strasbourg, and the Second to strike the Moselle near Pont-à-Mousson. If the French army should be found in front of the Second Army, it would be attacked in front by the Second Army and in flank by the First or the Third (or both). If it should be found on or north of the line from Saarburg to Lunéville, it could still be attacked from two sides by the Second and Third Armies in co-operation. The intention of the great right wheel was to attack the principal French army in such a direction as to drive it north and cut its communications with Paris. The fortress of Metz was to be only monitored, and the main German forces, after defeating the chief French army, would then march against Paris.

This plan was carried out in its broad outlines. The Battle of Wörth was brought on prematurely, and therefore led, not to the capture of MacMahon's army, which was intended, but only to its defeat and hasty retreat as far as Châlons. The Battle of Spicheren was not intended by Moltke, who wished to keep Bazaine's army on the Saar until he could attack it with the Second Army in front and the First Army on its left flank. But these unexpected victories did not disconcert Moltke, who carried out his intended advance to Pont-Mousson, crossed the Moselle with the First and Second Armies, then faced north and wheeled round, so that the effect of the battle of Gravelotte was to drive Bazaine into the fortress of Metz and cut him off from Paris.

Nothing shows Moltke's insight and strength of purpose in a clearer light than his determination to attack on 18 August, at the Battle of Gravelotte, when other strategists would have thought that, the strategic victory having been gained, a tactical victory was unnecessary. He has been blamed for the last attack at Gravelotte, which incurred heavy loss for no gain. But it is now known that this attack was ordered by the king and that Moltke blamed himself for not having used his influence to prevent it.

During the night following the battle Moltke left one army to invest Bazaine at Metz and set out with the two others to march towards Paris, the more southerly one leading, so that when MacMahon's army should be found the main blow might be delivered from the south and MacMahon driven to the north. On 25 August it was found that MacMahon was moving north-east for the relief of Bazaine. The moment Moltke was satisfied of the accuracy of his information, he ordered the German columns to turn their faces north instead of west. MacMahon's right wing was attacked at Beaumont while attempting to cross the Meuse, his advance necessarily abandoned, and his army with difficulty collected at Sedan.

At the Battle of Sedan, the two German armies surrounded the French army, which on 1 September was attacked from multiple sides and compelled to surrender. Moltke then resumed the advance on Paris, which was also surrounded.

From this time Moltke's strategy is remarkable for its judicious economy of force, for he was wise enough never to attempt more than was practicable with the means at his disposal. The surrender of Metz and of Paris was just a question of time, and the problem was, while maintaining the sieges, to be able to ward off the attacks of the new French armies levied for the purpose of raising the Siege of Paris. The Siege of Metz ended with its surrender on 27 October.

On 28 January 1871, an armistice was concluded at Versailles by which the garrison became virtual prisoners and the war was ended.

=== Later life ===
==== Final years and death ====
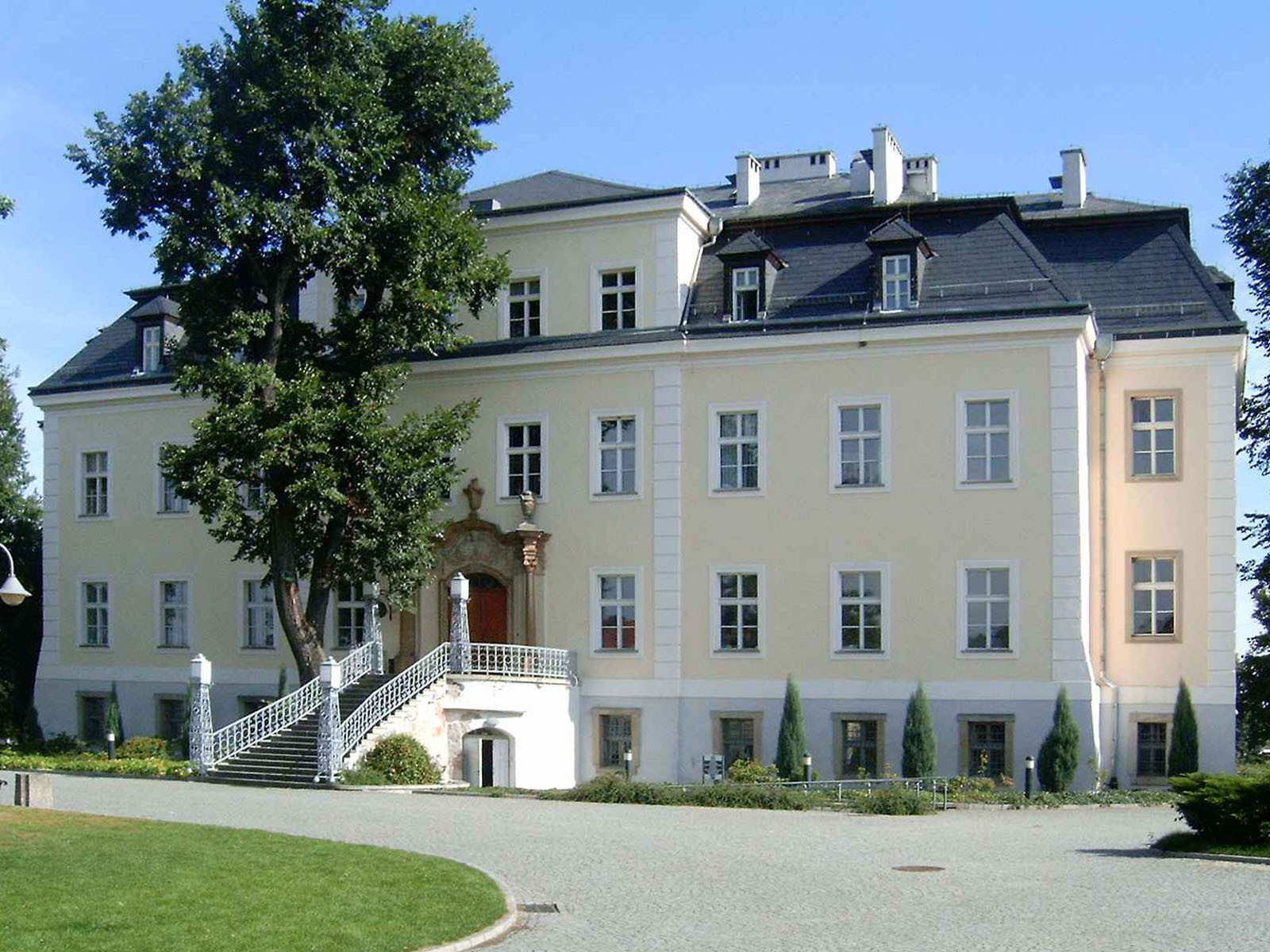
The Moltke palace at Creisau, now Krzyżowa, in 2005

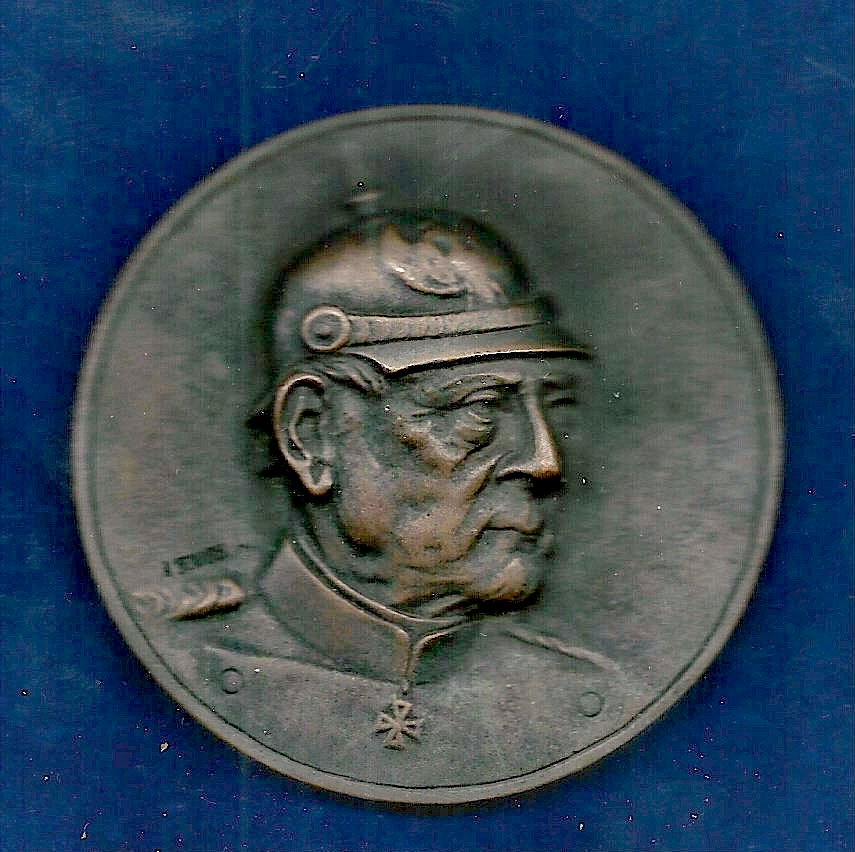
Medallion of Helmuth Graf von Moltke the Elder wearing the 1870 Grand Cross of the Iron Cross. Bronze medal by August Schabel, Munich

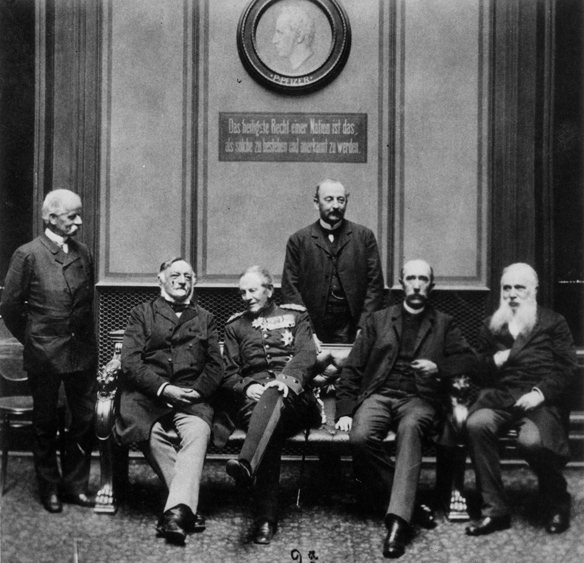
Members of German Conservative Party in 1889 (left to right): Rudolph Wichmann, Otto von Seydewitz, Helmuth Karl Bernhard von Moltke, Graf Konrad von Kleist-Schmenzin, Otto von Helldorff, Karl Gustav Ackermann

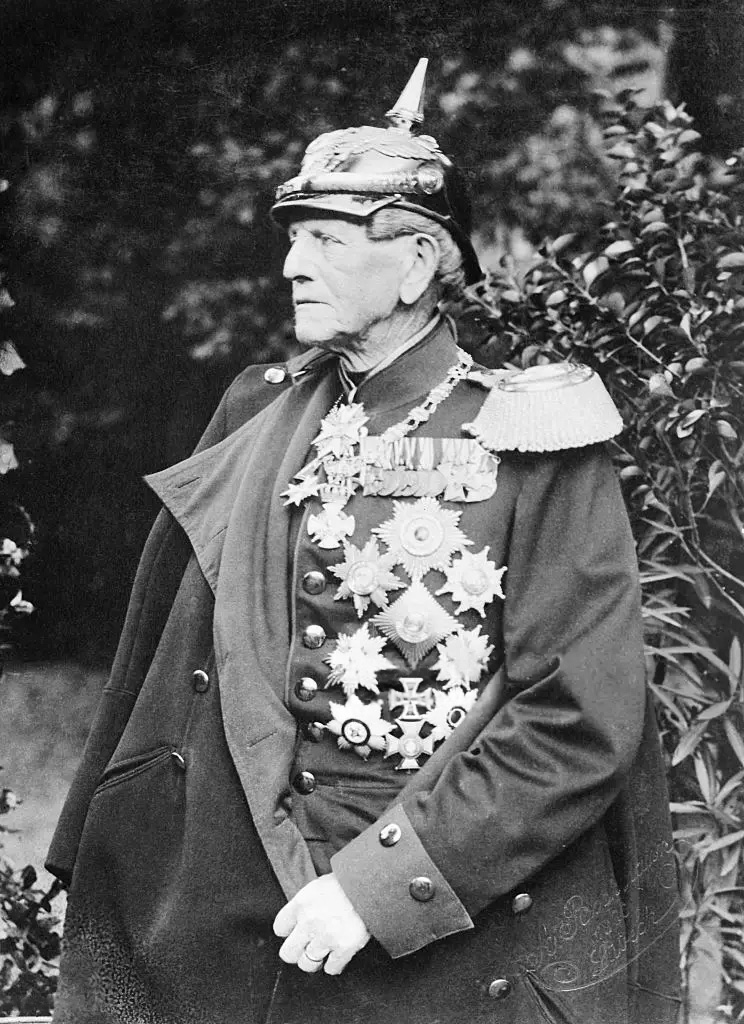
Moltke as Chief of Staff

In October 1870, Moltke was made a Graf (count) as a reward for his services during the Franco-Prussian War and victory at the Battle of Sedan. In June 1871, he was further rewarded by a promotion to the rank of field marshal and a large monetary grant. He served in the Diet of the North German Confederation from 1867 to 1871, and from 1871 to 1891 he was a member of the Reichstag (federal parliament).

Under his supervision, the German General Staff wrote studies about the Second Italian War of Independence, the Second Schleswig War, the Austro-Prussian War, and the Franco-Prussian War. William I recognized the cultural achievements of Moltke by awarding him the civil class of the Pour le Mérite on 24 May 1874.

Moltke superintended the preparation of the official history of the Franco-Prussian War, which was published between 1874 and 1881 by the German General Staff. After the war, he became a national hero and celebrity. More than 50 monuments to Moltke were erected throughout Germany in the late 19th and early 20th centuries; some were destroyed during or after World War II, but many remain.

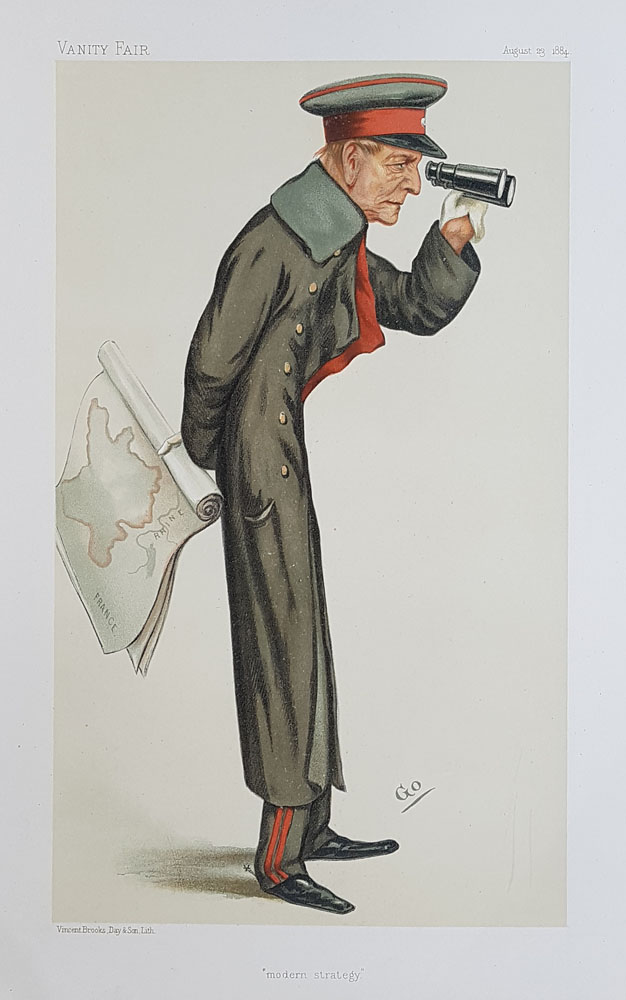
Moltke by Go in Vanity Fair, 1884

When Moltke retired in 1888 as Chief of the General Staff, he was succeeded by Alfred von Waldersee. (His nephew, Helmuth Johann Ludwig von Moltke, was chief from 1906 to 1914.) Moltke officially retired from active military service on 9 August 1888. His 90th birthday on 26 October 1890 was declared a national holiday with public celebrations held nationwide. Field Marshal Helmuth von Moltke remained in good health until he died at his home in Berlin on 24 April 1891 after a short illness. He received a state funeral where his body lay in state surrounded by military honours and thousands paid their respects, including Kaiser Wilhelm II. However, Bismarck (who resigned as chancellor the previous year after a falling out with Kaiser Wilhelm) did not attend the funeral. Thousands of troops, led by the Kaiser, escorted his casket to Berlin's Lehrter Railroad Station, from which it was transported to Silesia.

Moltke's remains were interred in the family mausoleum on the Creisau estate, which however was plundered in the last months of World War II, most probably by Red Army. No trace of his remains is known to exist.

The Creisau estate (later Kreisau) remained the Moltke family seat until 1945, when Moltke's great-grandnephew Helmuth James Graf von Moltke was executed for headquartering the eponymous Kreisau Circle at the manor. Surviving dedications to Moltke the Elder at the manor include two stairway frescos painted on his 100th birthday in 1900; The Shame, depicting the fall of Lübeck in 1806, and The Revenge, depicting the victorious capture of Paris in 1871.

== Personal life ==
In April 1842, aged 41, Moltke married his 16-year-old step-niece Bertha Maria Wilhelmine Burt, known as Marie. She was the daughter of John Heyliger Burt, of St. Croix in the Danish West Indies, a member of a wealthy slave-owning planter family. Burt had married Moltke's sister Auguste after the death of his first wife, who was also a German. It was a loving union and they remained married until Marie's death on 24 December 1868, although they had no children. Moltke never re-married. He was devoted to his wife, and long after her death still daily visited the chapel where she and her sister were buried to meditate.

== History of sound recording ==
"Helmuth von Moltke was born in 1800, technically the last year of the 18th century. [...] There's a wonderful irony here: Moltke's nickname was 'der große Schweiger' (the great silent one), because he had a reputation for speaking very little; and yet, of all the hundreds of millions of people born in the 18th century, his is the only voice we can hear today."

— Patrick Feaster, 2012

First recording of Moltke's voice

Second recording of Moltke's voice

On 21 October 1889, Moltke, then aged 88, made two audio recordings with Adelbert Theodor Wangemann, a German native who worked with Thomas Edison and had been sent to Europe with Edison's newly invented cylinder phonograph. Moltke recorded a line from William Shakespeare's Hamlet (Act 1, Scene 3, "Dein Ohr leih jedem, wen'gen deine Stimme" – "Give every man thine ear, but few thy voice"), as well as a passage from Goethe's Faust, both of which were engraved onto two wax cylinders. These recordings were then lost until their rediscovery in 1957, though they remained unidentified for decades after. On 30 January 2012, they were among a number of recordings revealed by the Thomas Edison National Historical Park. The two record cylinders made by Moltke are the only known surviving voice recordings of a person born in the 18th century.

== Dates of rank ==
From the corresponding article in the Japanese Wikipedia

=== Danish Army ===
- 1 January 1819: Second Lieutenant (Sekondløjtnant)

=== Prussian Army ===
- 19 March 1822: Second Lieutenant (Sekonde-Leutnant)
- 30 March 1833: First Lieutenant (Premierleutnant)
- 30 March 1835: Captain (Hauptmann)
- 12 April 1842: Major (Major)
- 26 September 1850: Lieutenant Colonel (Oberstleutnant)
- 2 December 1851: Colonel (Oberst)
- 9 August 1856: Major General (Generalmajor)
- 31 May 1859: Lieutenant General (Generalleutnant)
- 8 June 1866: General of Infantry (General der Infanterie)
- 16 June 1871: General Field Marshal (Generalfeldmarschall)

== Honours, awards and arms ==
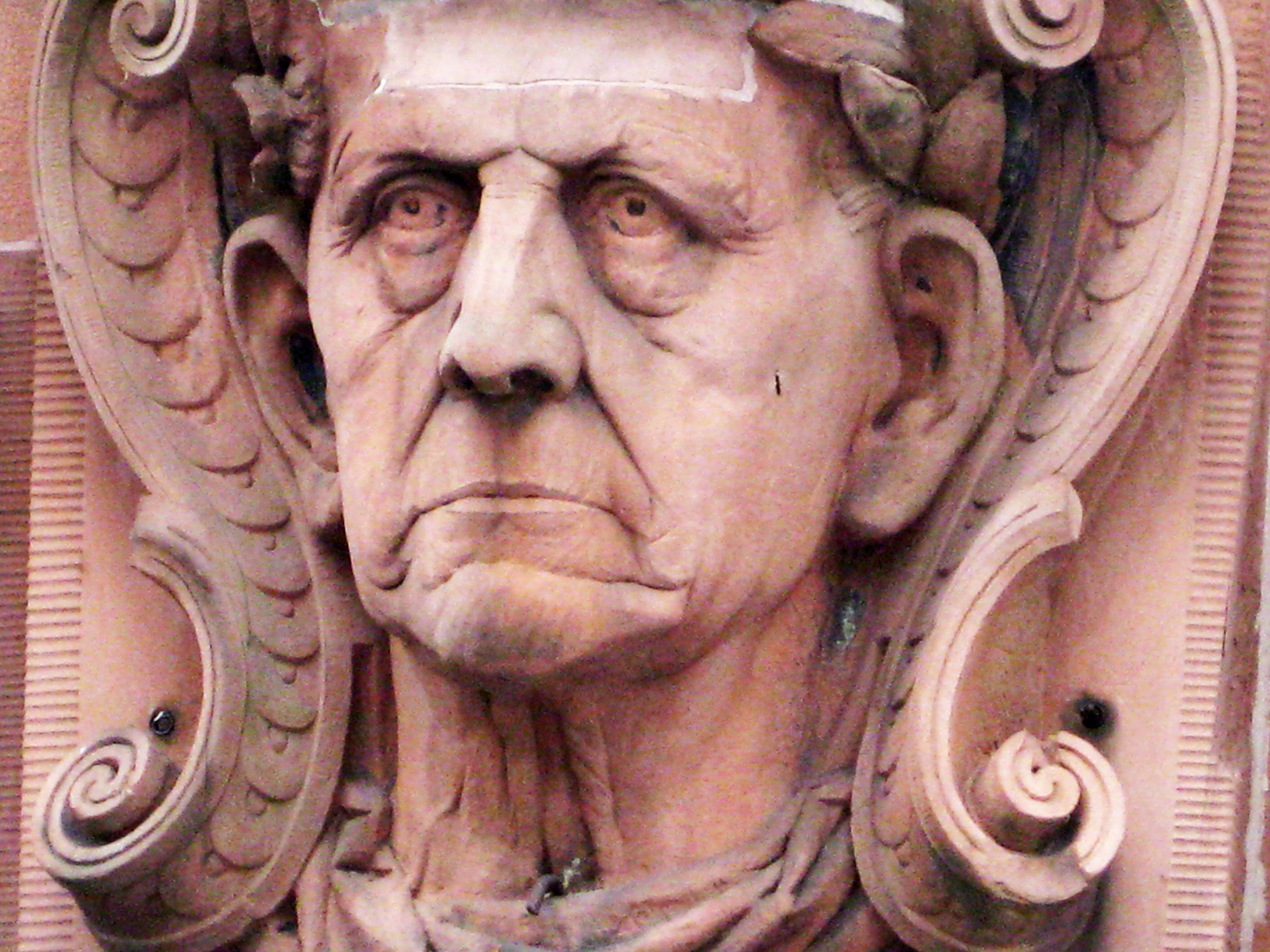
Moltke Bridge Berlin, head sculpture of Field Marshal Helmuth von Moltke

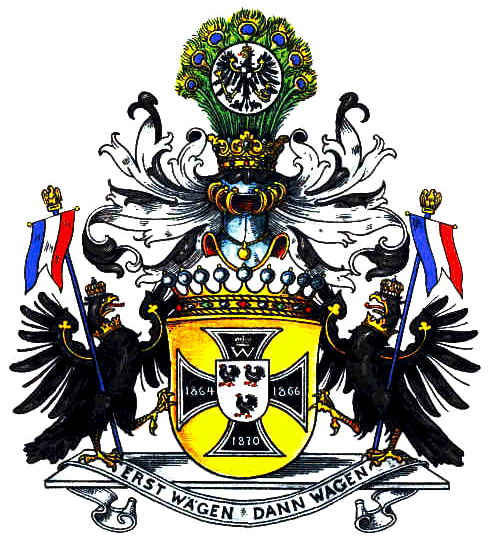
Comital arms awarded in 1870

- Granted the noble title of Count (Graf), October 1870
- Honorary Citizen of the City of Hamburg, for "meritorious achievements for the unified, reborn German fatherland" (Verdienste um das zur Einheit wiedergeborene Deutsche Vaterland), 1871

German orders and decorations

- Prussia:
  - Knight of Honour of the Johanniter Order, 1835; Knight of Justice, 1858; Commander of Honour
  - Pour le Mérite, 29 November 1839; with Oak Leaves, 17 February 1871; Grand Cross, 8 March 1879; with Crown and in Diamonds, 29 November 1889 (military); 24 May 1874 (civil)
  - Knight of the Royal Crown Order, 1st Class with Swords, 14 August 1864; with Enamel Band of the Red Eagle Order and Oak Leaves, 1865
  - Knight of the Black Eagle, 28 July 1866; with Collar, 1867; in Diamonds, 1873
  - Grand Cross of the Red Eagle, with Oak Leaves and Swords, 28 July 1866
  - Grand Cross of the Iron Cross, 22 March 1871
  - Grand Commander's Cross of the Royal House Order of Hohenzollern, with Star and Swords, 26 October 1875; in Diamonds
  - Service Award Cross
  - Lifesaving Medal on Ribbon
- Anhalt: Grand Cross of the Order of Albert the Bear, with Swords, 1871
- Baden:
  - Grand Cross of the Military Karl-Friedrich Merit Order, 1868
  - Knight of the House Order of Fidelity, 1871
- Bavaria: Grand Cross of the Military Order of Max Joseph, 18 October 1870
- Brunswick: Grand Cross of the Order of Henry the Lion, with Swords
- (Saxe-Coburg and Gotha) (Duchy of Saxe-Altenburg) (Saxe-Meiningen) Ernestine duchies: Grand Cross of the Saxe-Ernestine House Order, October 1861
- Hesse and by Rhine:
  - Grand Cross of the Ludwig Order, 9 March 1871
  - Military Merit Cross, 16 March 1871
- Schaumburg-Lippe: Military Merit Medal, with Swords
- Mecklenburg:
  - Grand Cross of the Wendish Crown, with Golden Crown and Swords
  - Military Merit Cross, 1st Class (Schwerin)
  - Cross for Distinction in War (Strelitz)
- Oldenburg: Grand Cross of the Order of Duke Peter Friedrich Ludwig, with Golden Crown and Swords, 31 December 1870
- Saxony:
  - Grand Cross of the Military Order of St. Henry, 1870
  - Knight of the Rue Crown, 1876
- Saxe-Weimar-Eisenach: Grand Cross of the White Falcon, with Swords, 1870
- Württemberg:
  - Grand Cross of the Württemberg Crown, 1869
  - Grand Cross of the Military Merit Order, 30 December 1870

Foreign orders and decorations

- Austrian Empire:
  - Grand Cross of the Imperial Order of Leopold, with War Decoration, 1864
  - Grand Cross of the Royal Hungarian Order of St. Stephen, 1872
- Belgium: Grand Cordon of the Order of Leopold (military), 25 April 1867
- Kingdom of Italy:
  - Grand Cross of the Military Order of Savoy, April 1867
  - Knight of the Annunciation, 26 September 1873
- Russian Empire:
  - Knight of St. Alexander Nevsky, in Diamonds, 25 June 1867
  - Knight of St. George, 2nd Class, 26 October 1870
  - Knight of St. Andrew, 30 December 1871
  - Knight of the White Eagle
  - Knight of St. Anna, 1st Class
- French Empire: Grand Cross of the Legion of Honour, June 1867
- Kingdom of Portugal: Grand Cross of the Tower and Sword, with Collar
- Ottoman Empire:
  - Order of Distinction, in Diamonds
  - Order of the Medjidie, 1st Class in Diamonds
  - Sword of Honour
- Siam: Grand Cross of the White Elephant
- Sweden-Norway: Knight of the Seraphim, 10 August 1881

== See also ==
- Fort Rapp

== Primary sources ==
- Moltke, Helmuth Karl Bernhard von (1991) [1923]. Wilkinson, Spenser (ed.). Moltke's Military Correspondence, 1870-71. Modern revivals in military history (Repr. ed.). Aldershot: Gregg Revivals. ISBN 978-0-7512-0040-9.
- — (1892). Letters of Field-Marshal Count Helmuth Von Moltke to His Mother and His Brothers. Translated by Bell, Clara; Fischer, Henry W. New York: Harper & Brothers.
- — (1893). Essays, speeches, and memoirs of Field-Marshal Count Helmuth von Moltke. Translated by McClumpha, Charles Flint; Barter, C.; Herms, Mary. New York: Harper & Brothers.

Military offices
Preceded by Karl von Reyher	Chief of the General Staff; 1857–1888	Succeeded by Count Waldersee
