= Management by exception =

Style of business management

Management by exception (MBE) is a style of business management that focuses on identifying and handling cases that deviate from the norm, recommended as best practice by the project management method.

Management by exception has both a general business application and a business intelligence application. General business exceptions are cases that deviate from the normal behavior in a business process and need to be cared for in a unique manner, typically by human intervention. Their cause might include: process deviation, infrastructure or connectivity issues, external deviation, poor quality business rules, malformed data, etc.

Management by exception here is the practice of investigating, resolving and handling such occurrences by using skilled staff and software tools. Good management can contribute to efficiency of business processes. Often in these cases the process will be called exception management, as exceptional cases are not the sole focus of the managerial policy, and exception management (as opposed to management by exception) denotes a more moderate application of the process.

== Process ==
Management by exception gives employees the responsibility to make decisions and fulfill their work or projects by themselves. It consists of focus and analysis of statistically relevant anomalies in the data. If an unusual situation or deviation in the recorded data appears, which could cause difficulties for the business and can't be managed by the employee at his level, the employee should pass the decision on to the next higher level.

For example, if all products are selling at their expected volumes for the quarter, except one particular product which is underperforming or overperforming at a statistically relevant margin, only the data for that product will be presented to the managers for further investigation and discovery of the root cause. Management by exception can bring forward business errors and oversights, ineffective strategies that need to be improved, changes in competition and business opportunities. Management by exception is intended to reduce the managerial load and enable managers to spend their time more effectively in areas where it will have the most impact. This management concept is widely attributed to Frederick W. Taylor and was first discussed in his work, Shop Management presented to the American Society of Mechanical Engineers in 1903.

Exception management also has an IT application. When writing code, if the programmer sees that there will be an exceptional case where a predefined assumption of the application will be breached, the programmer will need to deal with that exception programmatically from the outset.

Primarily, it is necessary to set objectives or norms with predictable or estimated results. These performances are assessed and get equated to the actual performance. Next, the deviation gets analysed. With an insignificant or no deviation, no action is required and senior managers can concentrate on other matters. If actual performances deviate significantly, the concern needs to be passed to the senior managers, as an “exception has occurred”. Finally, the aim is to solve this “exception” immediately.

== Using variance analysis ==
The accounting department is responsible for the forecasting of budgets and cost performance reports. The difference between the estimated and actual figures is defined as variance.

To understand the cause of the difference, managers need to investigate the questions how the variance differs from last period and what are the causes for not reaching the estimated figures. Analysers consider two types of variances: adverse variance and favourable variance. Adverse variance "exists when the difference between the budgeted and actual figure leads to a lower than expected profit". Favourable variance "exists when the difference between the budgeted and actual figure leads to a higher than expected profit". Rather than considering all variances, managers establish criteria to determine which variances are significant to focus on. Management by exception focuses mainly on large adverse variances, to find the areas of business, which deviates from predetermined standards in a negative way.

== Active versus passive ==
When reviewing management by exception and trying to determine where a skill set resides or what style they follow, it is important to keep in mind that this leadership method involves two distinct paths.

One, active management by exception, where the leader is proactive in assisting with issues and actively participates and watches subordinates to prevent mistakes. Two, passive management by exception. In this method, the manager only intervenes when standards are not being met and action must be taken, usually after something has happened rather than along the way.

There is value in taking either approach, but is not determinable until you can understand your environment. In a Laissez-faire, relaxed environment, where individuals understand their roles and are SMEs respectively, then following a more passive approach may encourage group morale and sense of independence. In a more stringent, less straightforward environment with people who are only starting in the role or not fully understanding tasks, taking a more active position would most likely prove to be the more beneficial route, as the step-by-step guidance can improve competence, as well as confidence.

== Advantages and disadvantages ==
=== Advantages ===
The main advantage of management by exception is that problematic issues are identified rapidly and managers are able to use their time and energy more wisely for important issues rather than for less important ones that could provoke delays in their daily operations. Additionally, managers need to work less on statistics and the frequency of making decisions becomes less, which saves time. As managers take fewer decisions, employees have more responsibility, which increases their motivation.

=== Disadvantages ===
Occurrences of mistakes in calculating budgets results in large variance differences and finding the errors can be time-consuming (thus expensive). Furthermore, financial analysts responsible for calculation variances are increasing overhead costs of a company. If the financial analysts are not performing well, it will become a waste of time and money. Another disadvantage is that only managers have the power over really important decisions, which can be demotivating for employees at a lower level. Furthermore, it takes time to pass the issues to managers. Managing employees who deviate from the normal procedures because of compliance failures are considered difficult to manage and typically find themselves with limited job duties and ultimately dismissed/terminated.
