= Mission command =

Style of military command

Mission command, also referred to as mission-type tactics, is a style of military command, which is derived from the Prussian-pioneered mission-type tactics doctrine, combines centralized intent with decentralized execution subsidiarity, and promotes freedom and speed of action, and initiative within defined constraints. Subordinates, understanding the commander's intentions, their own missions, and the context of those missions, are told what effect they are to achieve and the reason that it needs to be achieved. Subordinates then decide within their delegated freedom of action how best to achieve their missions. Orders focus on providing intent, control measures, and objectives and allow for greater freedom of action by subordinate commanders. Mission command is closely related to civilian management concept of workplace empowerment, and its use in business has been explored by writers such as Bungay (2011) and Tozer (1995, 2012). It is advocated but not always used by the militaries of the United States, Canada, Netherlands, Australia, the United Kingdom, Sweden, and NATO. Mission command is compatible with modern military net-centric concepts, and less centralized approaches to command and control (C2) in general.

== History ==
Originating from the Napoleonic corps concept, increasingly larger armies prevented movement en bloc. Commanders often separated by miles, communicating through horse-carried dispatches, were expected to maneuver in concert with one another. Beginning as early as 1807, the Prussian high command began to emphasize a battle philosophy that Moltke would later describe as:

A favourable situation will never be exploited if commanders wait for orders. The highest commander and the youngest soldier must be conscious of the fact that omission and inactivity are worse than resorting to the wrong expedient

Continued focus on tactical initiative at the lowest levels developed within the German army through the First World War and formally became Auftragstaktik during the Second World War. Despite the exceptional performance of the Wehrmacht at the tactical level, mission command was not adopted by NATO commanders until the 1970s.

The break up of the Former Yugoslavia in the 1990s drew in contingents from several modern militaries to United Nations or two stabilization forces (IFOR and SFOR). One was NORDBAT 2, consisting of a reinforced Swedish-Danish-Norwegian mechanized battalion in United Nations Protection Force (UNPROFOR). The infantry were Swedish volunteers, tanks from a Danish Leopard company, and a Norwegian helicopter detachment, under Swedish command. Coming from a nation that had not experienced war for almost 200 years, the Swedish leaders faced an unresponsive UN bureaucracy, an unclear mandate, and conflicting UN-imposed rules of engagement. Not unexpectedly, the Swedes turned to their culture of mission command which had grown and developed over decades preparing for expected invasions. Mission command turned out to be a force multiplier and an effective strategic asset. When facing ethical and practical challenges to performing its clear orders to protect the civilian population, NORDBAT 2 commanders realized they had no choice but to disregard orders that conflicted with the purpose of the mission. Mission command gave permission to every level of command to disobey orders to further the execution of the mission.

In a sudden or unexpected tactical situation, personnel on alert may have to react on their best initiative. In 2023 when Hamas breached the border between Israel and the Gaza Strip, a CH-53 helicopter squadron commander called his friend, a paratroop battalion commander, to proactively volunteer support to move alert-ready troops. IDF Command did not have a clear tactical picture. The squadron commander reported on Israeli television he was ordered to (in translation from Hebrew), "Carry out the mission to the best of your understanding."

== Modern usage ==
=== Principles ===
- Build cohesive teams through mutual trust
- Create shared understanding
- Provide a clear commander’s intent
- Exercise disciplined initiative
- Use mission orders
- Competence
- Risk acceptance.

=== Mission command in NATO ===
Mission command is a core doctrinal principle in NATO. NATO's keystone doctrine, AJP-01, states that mission command is grounded in two key principles: trust and mutual understanding.

AJP-01 underlines that a commander's trust in subordinates is the key determinant of the autonomy they will be granted. This trust, which must be earned and sustained, includes tolerance for mistakes. It is complemented by mutual understanding, ensuring that subordinates understand the commander's intent while commanders understand the constraints and realities facing their subordinates. Both trust and mutual understanding are underpinned by shared doctrine and command philosophy, reinforcing the effectiveness of the command structure.

NATO doctrine also outlines how differences in experience, doctrine, and culture may pose significant hurdles, potentially undermining trust and mutual understanding.

The academic literature on mission command often analyses national approaches to implementing mission command. These primarily relate to the inherent properties of military organisations, which form contexts that may be more or less susceptible to the exercise of mission command in practice. In other words, a conflict between a bureaucratic and risk-averse culture and a culture that prizes non-linearity and unpredictability. A 2020 study among Swedish company commanders found that they exhibited little tolerance for failure, concerns over professionalism, and bureaucratic and administrative demands that did not align with the philosophy of mission command.

In multinational contexts, these challenges multiply. A 2025 study among senior NATO officers found that written doctrine on mission command is interpreted differently from commander to commander, and that contemporary exercises tend to focus on compliance rather than risk-taking and trust-building, and that orders must be concise to promote mutual understanding.

== See also ==
- Command by negation
- Free war
- International Command and Control Research and Technology Symposium
- Maneuver warfare
- Operational art
