= AirLand Battle =

US Army strategy concept (1982 – late 1990s)

AirLand Battle was the overall conceptual framework that formed the basis of the US Army's European warfighting doctrine from 1982 into the late 1990s. AirLand Battle emphasized close coordination between land forces acting as an aggressively maneuvering defense, and air forces attacking rear-echelon forces feeding those front line enemy forces. AirLand Battle replaced 1976's "Active Defense" doctrine, and was itself replaced by "Full Spectrum Operations" in 2001.

== Background ==
=== DePuy reforms and Active Defense ===
The basic concept of the Blitzkrieg and similar doctrines was for the attacker to secretly concentrate his forces across a limited frontage to gain a local superiority over the defenders, culminating in an attack with at least tactical surprise leading to a breakthrough, which is then rapidly exploited to threaten the rear areas and destabilize the entire defensive position.

==== Conventional war ====
As the Vietnam War wound down, the US Army started studying its organization and structure, looking for ways to better align it with real-world conflicts. The U.S. Army Training and Doctrine Command (TRADOC), under the direction of General William E. DePuy, was formed in 1973 to study these issues and produce updated doctrine for Army forces.

TRADOC concluded that there were two main possibilities for future conflicts, a major armored conflict in Europe, or a primarily infantry fight in other locations around the world. The latter possibility led to the Rapid Deployment Force, and in time, the formation of United States Central Command. The former was more problematic given the Warsaw Pact's massive numerical superiority, especially given the ending of the draft.

==== Rapid wars, forward defense ====
When the Yom Kippur War broke out in 1973, it demonstrated a new lethality of conventional weapons, especially the anti-tank guided missile (ATGM). The new vulnerability of tanks, combined with the improved defensive power of the infantry, led to a revolution of thought within the US Army—that a war in Europe was winnable with conventional weapons. Impressed by the new weapons, DePuy started the process of re-arming the heavy divisions with weapons that would dramatically improve their firepower.

In DePuy's view, firepower had increased so much that war would be won or lost almost immediately, in the first few massive battles. As Field Manual 100-5 noted, "The US Army must above all else, prepare to win the first battle of the next war."

Since forces from the rear could not move forward quickly enough to take part in the titanic battles being envisioned, everyone had to be placed as close to the front lines as possible. The result was a new battlefield organization that moved the vast majority of US and allied forces much closer to the border between East and West Germany, in what became known as "Forward Defense". As reinforcements from the US could play only a minor role, the war was a "come as you are" affair. Air power was key; as the battle increased in tempo and the Soviet forces attempted to break through the defenders, channels would naturally form that would be attacked by air.

A 1975 study showed that:

- The main battle tank and attack helicopter are highly compatible weapons systems that are best employed using offensive principles where their mobility, firepower, and survivability can be optimized.
- The bi-dimensional mobility capabilities and overlapping firepower characteristics of the main battle tank and attack helicopter are desirable and enhance the ability to achieve a favorable exchange ratio on the battlefield.
- The main battle tank, complemented by the attack helicopter, will remain a decisive antiarmor weapons system for the foreseeable future.

One problem that was noted soon after the introduction of the 1976 version of FM 100-5 was how to deal with the enemy's reserve forces in the rear. There was the possibility that the US could win the first battle, only to meet a second unattrited reserve force soon after. A solution to this problem was not immediately forthcoming.

The results of war gaming the Active Defense doctrine was that by using this doctrine "you would lose every time."

Military historian Gwynne Dyer also criticized the defence strategy as militarily senseless, used only because an effective defense in depth doctrine was considered politically unacceptable to West Germany since that would mean much of the country would have been overrun by Warsaw Pact forces in an invasion before they could be stopped. As a result of the political compromise, a concerted Warsaw Pact invasion would likely have been able to break through the thin defensive zone with their numerically superior conventional forces easily, which would have soon forced NATO to resort to tactical nuclear weapons to counter it, which would have likely escalated the war to a full-scale global nuclear war. Furthermore, the doctrine was considered by the Warsaw Pact to be a threatening policy, which they feared would have meant an inverted in-depth defence by NATO in an aggressive fashion which could have entailed invading the Warsaw Pact as a pre-emptive move to create the defensive buffer zone in Soviet territory necessary to prevent a Soviet incursion, thus increasing the possibility that Warsaw Pact forces could have decided to make the first aggressive move themselves to forgo that attack, thus increasing the risk of war.

=== Extended battlefield ===
The major driving force in the evolution of AirLand Battle was General Donn A. Starry, who had taken over TRADOC from DePuy in 1977 and had been the primary force in implementing Active Defense. Since its introduction Starry had been attempting to find solutions to the problems of the enemy's reserves, and had been developing the concept of the "extended battlefield". This was a far more aggressive strategy, and required of the Army to fly its own CAS attack aircraft like the AH-64, as well as to better integrate USAF capabilities. It also gave birth to HIMARS, Bradley IFV, M109 Paladin, Patriot missile, M1 Abrams, and the Lockheed F-117 Nighthawk. President Carter approved the novel weapons programs.

The extended battlefield noted that different commanders had different views of the battlefield in geographical terms. The brigade commander had to consider actions beyond the immediate front lines, up to 15 km into the enemy's rear where his artillery was operating. The division commander considered the battlefield as far as 70 km out, while the corps commander had a field of view out to 150 km. Starry introduced the idea that there was not only a geographical dimension to the battlefield organization, but a time dimension as well; the brigade had perhaps 12 hours to respond to actions, while the division had 24 and the corps 72. It was this coordination both in space and time that defined the extended battlefield.

The reason that the time dimension was important was the result of studies in nuclear weapon employment at Fort Sill, Oklahoma, in December 1979. These studies demonstrated that interdiction in the enemy's rear could seriously delay the movements of the rear echelon forces and create "time windows" during which the US would have the tactical advantage. By ensuring that the command structure was aware of the time dimension of the battlefield, they would be better prepared to take advantage of these windows when they occurred.

=== FM 100-5 draft ===
Field Manual 100-5, 1982 release

When Active Defense was introduced in 1976, it had faced a wave of criticism, both from within the Army, and highly influential civilian advisers outside. Having witnessed this first-hand, Starry took measures to ensure this would not happen a second time. Foremost in these efforts was the early dissemination of the concept through briefings and wide circulation of Fort Leavenworth's draft of the new FM 100–5 in 1981. These were well received, especially its newly offensive orientation, which it summed up neatly with this statement:

... once political authorities commit military forces in pursuit of political aims, military forces must win something—else there will be no basis from which political authorities can bargain to win politically. Therefore, the purpose of military operations can not be simply to avert defeat—but rather it must be to win.

AirLand Battle became the primary battleplan of US forces in 1982,150 draf and NATO forces in 1984, with the help of SACEUR General Bernard W. Rogers. Its roll-out required upgrades to the C^{3}I equipment of all branches of the military, along with similar changes in the command and control structures to take advantage of the massive amounts of information the new C3I assets would be generating.

== AirLand Battle ==
NATO/WARSAW PACT CONVENTIONAL BATTLEFIELD FORCES IN EUROPE
Category: Ground forces	NATO	Pact
Division equivalents	90	133
Main Battle Tanks	19,600	32,000
Artillery, Mortar & MLRS	14,200	23,000
Antitank Guns and Launchers	13,370	18,000
Anti-aircraft Guns and Missile Launchers	6,900	12,800
Armored Personnel Carriers and Infantry Fighting Vehicles	32,850	38,000
Category: Aircraft	NATO	Pact
Armed Helicopters	1,430	1,410
Land Attack Aircraft	2,360	3,200
Fighter/Interceptors	900	2,700
Source: Geary 1987, p37

Prior to the 1970s the air forces had been seen primarily as for strategic bombing, delivery of tactical nuclear weapons, or for attacks on enemy air forces. Their counterpart to FM 100-5 listed only eight missions, only one of which required direct interaction with the Army forces in the field.

During the Vietnam War much of the US air power had been directed against supply buildup and movement points; roads, bridges, supply depots and the like. Attacking these targets with conventional weapons was an expensive process, requiring considerable amounts of ordnance to be expended to guarantee a "hit". In the late 1960s and early 1970s the introduction of smart weapons allowed conventional forces to directly attack point targets like bridges and roads, dramatically improving the ability to interdict the enemy, while at the same time allowing the aircraft to operate from safer, higher altitudes. These had little real impact during Vietnam when they were still very new, but their potential was obvious.

Starting in the early 1970s the Air Force took its first steps at looking at a conventional war in Europe. In late 1975, RAND Corporation completed a study that examined the merits of additional crewed aircraft, remotely piloted vehicles, and stand-off munitions for improving air-ground capability in NATO. A follow-up two-day workshop at RAND studied what vulnerabilities the Warsaw Pact might have to NATO airpower, which was followed by a series of additional studies that clearly demonstrated their reliance on the continued movement of supplies. Air planners were beginning to look for ways to best employ these new weapons at the same time Starry was working on the extended battlefield concepts. Simultaneously, the Undersecretary of Defense for Research and Engineering Bill Perry was interested in "stealth, precision and speed"; and one of their developments was the Lockheed F-117 Nighthawk, an airplane designed to evade detection by the Soviets and strike ground targets such as tanks, anti-aircraft radar systems and missile complexes.

Starry emphasized the close coordination between the Army and Air Force to produce an integrated attack plan that would use the land forces in a counter-blitz while air power, artillery and special operation forces stopped the movement of the reserves toward the front line. To achieve this, both the Army and Air Force embarked on equipment modernization programs. The Army's effort was collectively called the "Big Five": the M1 Abrams, the Bradley Fighting/Cavalry Vehicle, the AH-64 Apache, the UH-60 Black Hawk, and the MIM-104 PATRIOT missile system. In addition to the aforementioned F-117, the Air Force's requirements for air interdiction against enemy rear-echelon forces would lead to the development of systems such as the Enhanced Tactical Fighter (or Dual-Role Fighter which would result in the F-15E) with LANTIRN for deep strike and Advanced Tactical Fighter (which would result in the F-22) to ensure air superiority for enabling those strikes. The result would stretch out the Warsaw Pact's advance in time, allowing the smaller NATO forces to continually attrit the enemy all along the battlefield while the reinforcements arrived piecemeal. The result was a single AirLand Battle.

Although the focus of AirLand Battle was on conventional warfare, it did not ignore the threat of nuclear or chemical warfare. It suggested planning for nuclear strikes or chemical weapons use from the beginning of combat, using them as a threat from the start that would force the enemy to disperse his forces or run the risk of a nuclear strike as they concentrated. The plans did, however, suggest they only be used if first attacked in kind.

The overall message conveyed by the AirLand Battle concept of 1981 was that the Army must leave behind the restricted notion of winning the fight only in the traditional "main battle area." AirLand Battle was first promulgated in the 1982 version of FM 100-5, and revised for the FM 100-5 version of 1986, which added the Follow-on Forces Attack concept.

The doctrine, unbeknownst at the time, turned out to be a success psychologically on the Warsaw Pact. In 1992, after the USSR had collapsed, at a friendly dinner of old adversaries an East German general said to an American diplomat that "We had no options left" after the doctrine had been understood across the Iron Curtain. Marshal Gorkov knew that the Soviets were in trouble.

DTRA chief Jim Tegnelia opines that AirLand Battle was the child of "the marriage of a policy problem, a good strategy and technology. When they are put together in resonance can create very synergistic and revolutionary effects with regard to military operations."

From 1993 onward, the Pentagon embraced a new doctrine: network-centric warfare, made possible by the Digital Revolution.

== In popular culture ==
"AirLand Battle" stands as part of the title of the sequel to Wargame: European Escalation, Wargame: AirLand Battle. The game is set in the Cold War when AirLand Battle was a major strategy of NATO, and pits the player playing as either a NATO commander or Warsaw Pact general leading military engagements against the other alliance. The sequel introduces fixed-wing aircraft units to the game that was previously limited to land units and helicopters.

== See also ==
- AirSea Battle

== Citations ==
=== Bibliography ===
- Blythe, Wilson C. Jr. (March 2010). AirLand Battle: The Development of a Doctrine (PDF) (MA). Eastern Michigan University.
- Boyd, John R. "Patterns of Conflict" (PPT file)
- Doughty, Robert A. The Evolution of US Army Tactical Doctrine, 1946–76, DIANE Publishing, 2001, ISBN 1-4289-1602-4
- Geary, Patrick Joseph (May 1987). "NATO battlefield strategy for the conventional defense of Central Europe". University of Richmond.
- Grant, Rebecca (1 June 2001). "Deep Strife". Air & Space Forces Magazine.
- Romjue, John L. "The Evolution of the Airland Battle Concept" "Archived copy". Archived from the original on 3 March 2016., Air University Review, May–June 1984
- Romjue, John L. (1998). American Army Doctrine for the Post-Cold War. DIANE Publishing.
- Sinclair, Edward J. "Attack Helicopters: Airland Battle Future's Sword of Vengeance", School of Advanced Military Studies, Fort Leavenworth, KS, January 1991
- Skinner, Douglas W. (September 1988). "Airland Battle Doctrine" (PDF). CENTERFORNAVAL ANALYSES.
- Spiller, Roger B. (1992). Combined Arms in Battle Since 1939. U.S. Army Command and General Staff College Press.
- Wilson, John B. (1998). Maneuver and Firepower: The Evolution of Divisions and Separate Brigades. U.S. Army Center of Military History.
- Winton, Harold R. "Partnership and Tension: The Army and Air Force Between Vietnam and Desert Shield", Parameters, Spring 1996, pp. 100–19
