= United States Army Field Manuals =

Military field manuals used by the U.S. Army

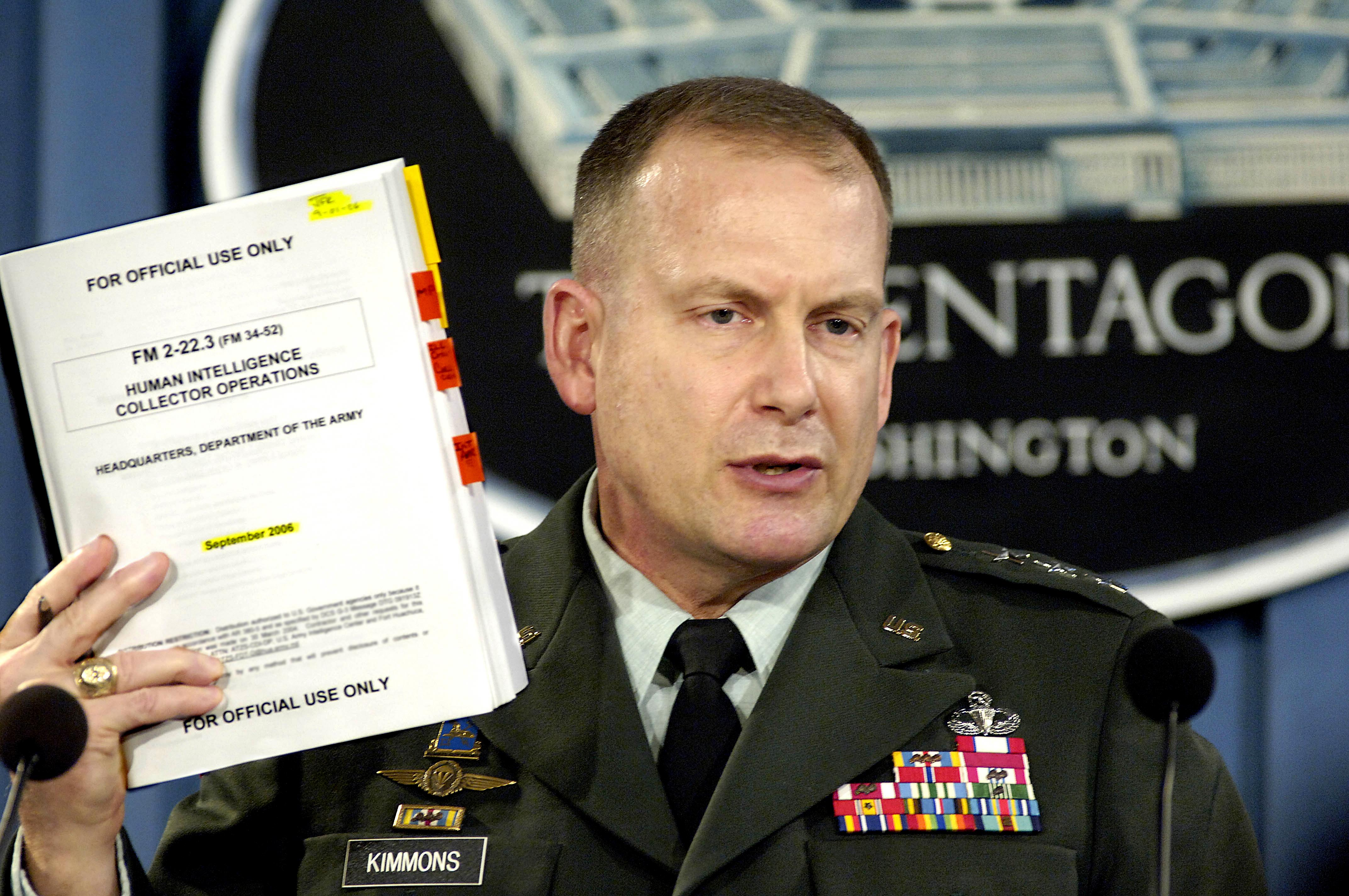
United States Army Lt. Gen. John Kimmons with a copy of the Army Field Manual, FM 2-22.3, Human Intelligence Collector Operations, in 2006

FM-34-45.

United States Army Field Manuals are published by the United States Army's Army Publishing Directorate. They contain detailed information and how-tos for procedures important to soldiers serving in the field.

As of July 2007, some 542 field manuals were in use. Starting in 2010, the U.S. Army began review and revision of all of its doctrinal publications, under the initiative "Doctrine 2015". Since then, the most important doctrine have been published in Army Doctrine Publications (ADP) and Army Doctrine Reference Publications (ADRP), replacing the former key Field Manuals. Army Techniques Publications (ATP), Army Training Circulars (TC), and Army Technical Manuals (TM) round out the new suite of doctrinal publications. Not all FMs are being rescinded; 50 select Field Manuals will continue to be published, periodically reviewed and revised. They are usually available to the public at low cost or free electronically. Many websites have begun collecting PDF versions of Army Field Manuals, Technical Manuals, and Weapon Manuals. The Library of Congress maintains a list of every Field Manual published between the 1940s to the 1970s.

== History ==
According to The New York Times, the Army has started to "wikify" certain field manuals, allowing any authorized user to update the manuals. This process, specifically using the MediaWiki arm of the military's professional networking application, milSuite, was recognized by the White House as an Open Government Initiative in 2010.

On 6 March 1989 General Alfred M. Gray Jr. published FMFM-1 (later, MCDP-1) Warfighting. This document would serve as a foundation to cement the Marine Corps' distinction as an independent force and demonstrate commitment to the doctrine of maneuver warfare. It was part of an increased commitment to military education as Marine Corps University was initiated to modernize the professional Marine.

== List of selected field manuals ==
- FM 1, The Army^{[A]} – "establishes the fundamental principles for employing landpower." Together, it and FM 3–0 are considered by the U.S. Army to be the "two capstone doctrinal manuals."
- FM 1-100: "Army Aviation Operations" (PDF). Headquarters, Department of the Army. 21 February 1997. Archived from the original (PDF) on 30 January 2023.
- FM 1-112: "Attack Helicopter Operations" (PDF). Headquarters, Department of the Army. 2 April 1997. Archived from the original (PDF) on 29 January 2023.
- FM 1-113: "UTILITY AND CARGO HELICOPTER OPERATIONS" (PDF). Headquarters, Department of the Army. 25 June 1997. Archived from the original (PDF) on 30 January 2023.
- FM 1-116: "AIR CAVALRY / RECONNAISSANCE TROOP" (PDF). HEADQUARTERS, DEPARTMENT OF THE ARMY. February 1991. Archived from the original (PDF) on 29 January 2023.
- FM 2-22.2, Counterintelligence
- FM 3–0, Operations^{[B]} – The operations guide "lays out the fundamentals of war fighting for future and current generations of recruits."
- FM 3-01.11 Air Defense Artillery Reference Handbook
- FM 3-04: "Army Aviation" (PDF). HEADQUARTERS, DEPARTMENT OF THE ARMY. July 2015. Archived from the original (PDF) on 17 March 2023.
- FM 3-04.126: "Attack Reconnaissance Helicopter Operations" (PDF). Headquarters, Department of the Army. February 2007. Archived from the original (PDF) on 29 January 2023.
- FM 3-05.70 U.S. Army Survival Manual –Used to train survival techniques (formerly the FM 21-76).
- FM 3–0.5.130, Army Special Operations Forces Unconventional Warfare. Establishes keystone doctrine for Army special operations forces (ARSOF) operations in unconventional warfare.
- FM 5–31, Boobytraps – Describes how regular demolition charges and materials can be used for victim-initiated explosive devices. This manual is no longer active, but is still frequently referenced.
- FM 3–21.8, The Infantry Rifle Platoon and Squad
- FM 3–24, Insurgencies and Countering Insurgencies;– Published May 2014.
- FM 3-09.34, Kill Box Tactics and Multiservice Procedures
- FM 3-14, Army Space Operations
- FM 3-18, Special Operations Forces
- FM 3-19.15, Civil Disturbance Operations
- FM 3-13, Inform and Influence Activities Draft Manual
- FM 3–22.5 (Drill and Ceremony)
- FM 3–25.150 (Combatives)
- FM 90-10-1 (Urban warfare)
- FM 3-21.20 – covers the Army Physical Fitness Test (APFT)
- FM 6-22 Leader Development "The tenets of Army leader development provide the essential principles that have made the Army successful at developing its leaders."
- FM 7-0: TRAINING FOR FULL SPECTRUM OPERATIONS (PDF). HEADQUARTERS DEPARTMENT OF THE ARMY. December 2008.
- FM 20-3 CAMOUFLAGE, CONCEALMENT, AND DECOYS
- FM 21-15 Individual Clothing and Equipment - Used to instruct care for clothing and equipment.
- FM 24-1 Combat Communications
- FM5-15 Field Fortifications: 1783, 1916, 1940, 1944, 1968, 1972
- FM 27-10 (1956) – Cornerstone of rules of war for the US Military. This manual was last modified in 1976 and is still used by the US military today.
- FM 31-27, Pack Animals in Support of Special Operations Forces
- FM 34-52, Intelligence Interrogation – Used to train CIA interrogators in conducting effective interrogations while conforming with US and international law. Updated in December 2005 to include a 10-page classified section as a result of the Abu Ghraib torture and prisoner abuse scandal. Replaced in September 2006 by FM 2-22.3, Human Intelligence Collector Operations.
- FM 100-5

=== Notes ===
A. Headquarters, Department of the Army (14 June 2005). FM 1, The Army. Washington, DC: GPO. OCLC 72695749. ("HTML". Archived from the original (www) on 15 June 2005. "PDF" (PDF). Archived from the original (PDF) on 18 June 2005. "PDF-in-ZIP". Archived from the original (ZIP) on 18 June 2005. Retrieved 31 August 2013.)
B. Headquarters, Department of the Army (14 June 2001). FM 3–0, Operations. Washington, DC: GPO. OCLC 50597897.

— Part A: Begin – Chapter 4 (PDF). Archived from the original (PDF) on 14 July 2007.
— Part B: Chapter 5 – Chapter 9 (PDF). Archived from the original (PDF) on 14 July 2007.
— Part C: Chapter 10 – End (PDF). Archived from the original (PDF) on 14 July 2007.

== See also ==
- List of United States Army Field Manuals
- Graphic training aids
- List of numbered documents of the United States Department of War
