= List of United States Army Field Manuals =

This list of United States Army Field Manuals contains information about a variety of United States Army Field Manuals.

== Abbreviations and Keys ==
- ADP # means Army Doctrine Publication No. #;
- FM # means Field Manual No. #;
- DA means Department of the Army;
- GPO means Government Publishing Office;
- HQ, DA means Headquarters, Department of the Army;
- WD means War Department.

Keys
Odd-numbered revised release of edition.
Initial or even-numbered revised release of edition.
Even-numbered edition.
Initial or Odd-numbered edition.

== Two capstones ==
ADP 1 and ADP 3–0 are the two capstones of U.S. Army's field manuals.

=== ADP 1 (FM 1, FM 100–1) ===
ADP 1
Status	FM code	Title	Order Date	Official (or De facto) superseding note	Signed by
ACTIVE	FM 1	FM 1, The Army	6 May 2025	This publication supersedes FM 1, 14 June 2005.	Randy A. George
INACTIVE	ADP 1 (incl. C1 and C2)	ADP 1, The Army (with included Changes No. 1 and No. 2)	6 August 2013	This publication supersedes FM 1, 14 June 2005.	Raymond T. Odierno
INACTIVE	ADP 1 (incl. C1)	ADP 1, The Army (with included Change No. 1)	7 November 2012	This publication supersedes FM 1, 14 June 2005.	Raymond T. Odierno
INACTIVE	ADP 1 (FM 1)	ADP 1, The Army	17 September 2012	This publication supersedes FM 1, 14 June 2005.	Raymond T. Odierno
INACTIVE	FM 1	FM 1, The Army	14 June 2005	This publication supersedes FM 1, 14 June 2001.	Peter J. Schoomaker
INACTIVE	FM 1	FM 1, The Army	14 June 2001	This publication supersedes FM 100–1, 14 June 1994.	Eric K. Shinseki
INACTIVE	FM 100–1	FM 100–1, The Army	14 June 1994	This publication supersedes FM 100–1, 10 December 1991.	Gordon R. Sullivan
INACTIVE	FM 100–1	FM 100–1, The Army	10 December 1991	This publication supersedes FM 100–1, 29 August 1986.	Gordon R. Sullivan
INACTIVE	FM 100–1	FM 100–1, The Army	29 August 1986	This publication supersedes FM 100–1, 14 August 1981.	John A. Wickham, Jr.
INACTIVE	FM 100–1	FM 100–1, The Army	14 August 1981	This publication supersedes FM 100–1, 29 September 1978.	Edward C. Meyer
INACTIVE	FM 100–1	FM 100–1, The Army	29 September 1978	De facto: Initial Release.	Bernard W. Rogers

=== ADP 3–0 (FM 3–0, FM 100–5, Field Service Regulations) ===
ADP 3–0
Status	FM code	Title	Order Date	Official (or De facto) superseding note	Signed by
ACTIVE	FM 3–0	FM 3–0, Operations	1 March 2025	This manual supersedes FM 3-0, dated 1 October 2022.	Randy A. George
INACTIVE	FM 3–0	FM 3–0, Operations	1 October 2022	This manual supersedes FM 3-0, dated 6 October 2017.	James C. McConville
INACTIVE	ADP 3–0 (FM 3–0)	ADP 3–0, Unified Land Operations	10 October 2011	This manual supersedes FM 3–0, dated 27 February 2008 and Change 1, dated 22 February 2011.	Raymond T. Odierno
INACTIVE	FM 3–0 (incl. C1)	FM 3–0, Operations (with included Change 1)	22 February 2011	This publication supersedes FM 3–0, 14 June 2001.	Martin E. Dempsey
INACTIVE	FM 3–0	FM 3–0, Operations	27 February 2008	This publication supersedes FM 3–0, 14 June 2001.	William S. Wallace
INACTIVE	FM 3–0 (formerly FM 100–5)	FM 3–0, Operations	14 June 2001	This publication supersedes FM 100–5, 14 June 1993.	Eric K. Shinseki
INACTIVE	FM 100–5	FM 100–5, Operations	14 June 1993	This publication supersedes FM 100–5, 5 May 1986.	Gordon R. Sullivan
INACTIVE	FM 100–5	FM 100–5, Operations	5 May 1986	This publication supersedes FM 100–5, 20 August 1982. Introduced concept of AirLand Battle.	John A. Wickham, Jr.
INACTIVE	FM 100–5	FM 100–5, Operations	20 August 1982	This publication supersedes FM 100–5, 1 July 1976.	Edward C. Meyer
INACTIVE	C1, FM 100–5	FM 100–5, Operations (with included Change No. 1)	29 April 1977	This manual supersedes FM 100–5, 6 September 1968, including all changes.	Bernard W. Rogers
INACTIVE	FM 100–5	FM 100–5, Operations	1 July 1976	This manual supersedes FM 100–5, 6 September 1968, including all changes.	Fred C. Weyand
INACTIVE	C1, FM 100–5	FM 100–5, Operations of Army Forces in The Field (with included Change No. 1)	17 December 1971	This manual supersedes FM 100–5, 19 February 1962, including all changes.	W. C. Westmoreland
INACTIVE	FM 100–5	FM 100–5, Operations of Army Forces in The Field	6 September 1968	This manual supersedes FM 100–5, 19 February 1962, including all changes.	W. C. Westmoreland
INACTIVE	C1, FM 100–5	FM 100–5, Field Service Regulations, Operations (with included Change No. 1)	7 February 1964	This manual supersedes FM 100–5, 27 September 1954, including C 1, 16 December 1954, C 2, 27 July 1956, and C 3, 24 January 1958.	Earle G. Wheeler
INACTIVE	FM 100–5	FM 100–5, Field Service Regulations, Operations	19 February 1962	This manual supersedes FM 100–5, 27 September 1954, including C 1, 16 December 1954, C 2, 27 July 1956, and C 3, 24 January 1958.	George H. Decker
INACTIVE	FM 100–5 (incl. C1, C2, and C3)	FM 100–5, Field Service Regulations, Operations (with included Changes No. 1, No. 2, and No. 3)	24 January 1958	This manual supersedes FM 100–5, 15 August 1949, including C 1, 25 July 1952.	Maxwell D. Taylor
INACTIVE	FM 100–5 (incl. C1 and C2)	FM 100–5, Field Service Regulations, Operations (with included Changes No. 1 and No. 2)	27 July 1956	This manual supersedes FM 100–5, 15 August 1949, including C 1, 25 July 1952.	Maxwell D. Taylor
INACTIVE	FM 100–5 (incl. C1)	FM 100–5, Field Service Regulations, Operations (with included Change No. 1)	16 December 1954	This manual supersedes FM 100–5, 15 August 1949, including C 1, 25 July 1952.	M. B. Ridgway
INACTIVE	FM 100–5	FM 100–5, Field Service Regulations, Operations	27 September 1954	This manual supersedes FM 100–5, 15 August 1949, including C 1, 25 July 1952.	M. B. Ridgway
INACTIVE	FM 100–5 (incl. C1)	FM 100–5, Field Service Regulations, Operations (with included Change No. 1)	25 July 1952	This manual supersedes FM 100–5, 15 June 1944.	J. Lawton Collins
INACTIVE	FM 100–5	FM 100–5, Field Service Regulations, Operations	15 August 1949	This manual supersedes FM 100–5, 15 June 1944.	Omar N. Bradley
INACTIVE	FM 100–5	FM 100–5, Field Service Regulations, Operations	15 June 1944	This manual supersedes FM 100–5, 22 May 1941, including C 1, 16 September 1942; C 2, 12 November 1942; and C 3, 26 April 1943.	G. C. Marshall
INACTIVE	FM 100–5 (incl. C1, C2, and C3)	FM 100–5, Field Service Regulations, Operations (with included Changes No. 1, No. 2, and No. 3)	26 April 1943	These regulations supersede FM 100–5, Tentative Field Service Regulations, Operations, October 1, 1939.	G. C. Marshall
INACTIVE	FM 100–5 (incl. C1 and C2)	FM 100–5, Field Service Regulations, Operations (with included Changes No. 1 and No. 2)	12 November 1942	These regulations supersede FM 100–5, Tentative Field Service Regulations, Operations, October 1, 1939.	G. C. Marshall
INACTIVE	FM 100–5 (incl. C1)	FM 100–5, Field Service Regulations, Operations (with included Change No. 1)	16 September 1942	These regulations supersede FM 100–5, Tentative Field Service Regulations, Operations, October 1, 1939.	G. C. Marshall
INACTIVE	FM 100–5	FM 100–5, Field Service Regulations, Operations	22 May 1941	These regulations supersede FM 100–5, Tentative Field Service Regulations, Operations, October 1, 1939.	G. C. Marshall
INACTIVE	FM 100–5	FM 100–5, Tentative Field Service Regulations, Operations	1 October 1939	These regulations supersede Field Service Regulations, 1923.	G. C. Marshall
INACTIVE	FSR^{[i]} 1923	Field Service Regulations, United States Army, 1923	2 November 1923	...Field Service Regulations, revised by the General Staff... De facto: These FSR supersede FSR, 19 March 1914, including all changes and various editions.	J. L. Hines
INACTIVE	FSR 1914 (D)	Field Service Regulations, United States Army, 1914, corrected to July 31, 1918. (Changes Nos. 1 to 11)	31 July 1918	...Field Service Regulations, revised by the General Staff... De facto: These FSR supersede FSR, 21 May 1913.	Leonard Wood
INACTIVE	FSR 1914 (C) (incl. C1 – C11)	Field Service Regulations, United States Army, 1914 (with included Changes Nos. 1 – 11)^{[ii]}	30 July 1918	...Field Service Regulations, revised by the General Staff... De facto: These FSR supersede FSR, 21 May 1913.	Leonard Wood
INACTIVE	FSR 1914 (C) (incl. C1 – C10)	Field Service Regulations, United States Army, 1914 (with included Changes Nos. 1 – 10)^{[ii]}	17 June 1918	...Field Service Regulations, revised by the General Staff... De facto: These FSR supersede FSR, 21 May 1913.	Leonard Wood
INACTIVE	FSR 1914 (C) (incl. C1 – C9)	Field Service Regulations, United States Army, 1914 (with included Changes Nos. 1 – 9)^{[ii]}	6 May 1918	|...Field Service Regulations, revised by the General Staff... De facto: These FSR supersede FSR, 21 May 1913.	Leonard Wood
INACTIVE	FSR 1914 (C) (incl. C1 – C8)	Field Service Regulations, United States Army, 1914 (with included Changes Nos. 1 – 8)	10 January 1918	...Field Service Regulations, revised by the General Staff... De facto: These FSR supersede FSR, 21 May 1913.	Leonard Wood
INACTIVE	FSR 1914 (C) (incl. C1 – C7)	Field Service Regulations, United States Army, 1914 (with included Changes Nos. 1 – 7)	18 August 1917	...Field Service Regulations, revised by the General Staff... De facto: These FSR supersede FSR, 21 May 1913.	Leonard Wood
INACTIVE	FSR 1914 (C)	Field Service Regulations, United States Army, 1914, corrected to April 15, 1917. (Changes Nos. 1 to 6)	15 April 1917	...Field Service Regulations, revised by the General Staff... De facto: These FSR supersede FSR, 21 May 1913.	Leonard Wood
INACTIVE	FSR 1914 (B) (incl. C1 – C6)	Field Service Regulations, United States Army, 1914 (with included Changes Nos. 1 – 6)^{[ii]}	14 April 1917	...Field Service Regulations, revised by the General Staff... De facto: These FSR supersede FSR, 21 May 1913.	Leonard Wood
INACTIVE	FSR 1914 (B) (incl. C1 – C5)	Field Service Regulations, United States Army, 1914 (with included Changes Nos. 1 – 5)	20 December 1916	...Field Service Regulations, revised by the General Staff... De facto: These FSR supersede FSR, 21 May 1913.	Leonard Wood
INACTIVE	FSR 1914 (B) (incl. C1 – C4)	Field Service Regulations, United States Army, 1914 (with included Changes Nos. 1 – 4)	4 February 1916	...Field Service Regulations, revised by the General Staff... De facto: These FSR supersede FSR, 21 May 1913.	Leonard Wood
INACTIVE	FSR 1914 (B) (incl. C1, C2 and C3)	Field Service Regulations, United States Army, 1914 (with included Changes No. 1, No. 2, and No. 3)	22 June 1915	...Field Service Regulations, revised by the General Staff... De facto: These FSR supersede FSR, 21 May 1913.	Leonard Wood
INACTIVE	FSR 1914 (B) (incl. C1 and C2)	Field Service Regulations, United States Army, 1914 (with included Changes No. 1 and No. 2)^{[ii]}	24 April 1915	...Field Service Regulations, revised by the General Staff... De facto: These FSR supersede FSR, 21 May 1913.	Leonard Wood
INACTIVE	FSR 1914 (B) (incl. C1)	Field Service Regulations, United States Army, 1914 (with included Changes No. 1)^{[ii]}	20 March 1915	...Field Service Regulations, revised by the General Staff... De facto: These FSR supersede FSR, 21 May 1913.	Leonard Wood
INACTIVE	FSR 1914 (B)	Field Service Regulations, United States Army, 1914, corrected to July 1, 1914.	1 July 1914; October 1914 (published)	...Field Service Regulations, revised by the General Staff... De facto: These FSR supersede FSR, 21 May 1913.	Leonard Wood
INACTIVE	FSR 1914 (A) (incl. C1)	Field Service Regulations, United States Army, 1914 (with included Changes No. 1)^{[ii]}	29 June 1914	...Field Service Regulations, revised by the General Staff... De facto: These FSR supersede FSR, 21 May 1913.	Leonard Wood
INACTIVE	FSR 1914 (A)	Field Service Regulations, United States Army, 1914	19 March 1914	...Field Service Regulations, revised by the General Staff... De facto: These FSR supersede FSR, 21 May 1913.	Leonard Wood
INACTIVE	FSR 1913 (incl. Changes)	Field Service Regulations, United States Army, 1913, corrected to May 21, 1913	21 May 1913	...Field Service Regulations, revised by the General Staff... De facto: These FSR supersede FSR, 21 February 1910.	Leonard Wood
INACTIVE	FSR 1910	Field Service Regulations, United States Army, 1910	21 February 1910	...Field Service Regulations, revised by the General Staff... De facto: These FSR supersede FSR, 1 February 1905, including all changes.	J. Franklin Bell
INACTIVE	FSR 1905 (incl. Changes)	Field Service Regulations, United States Army, 1905, with Amendments to 1908	May 1908 (published)	...Field Service Regulations, revised by the General Staff... De facto: Initial Release with Included Changes.	Wm. H. Taft
INACTIVE	FSR 1905	Field Service Regulations, United States Army	1 February 1905	De facto: Initial Release.	Wm. H. Taft

i. FSR is equals to Field Service Regulations.
ii. Detached edition is not known.

== See also ==
- United States Army Field Manuals
