= Donn A. Starry =

American general (1925–2011)

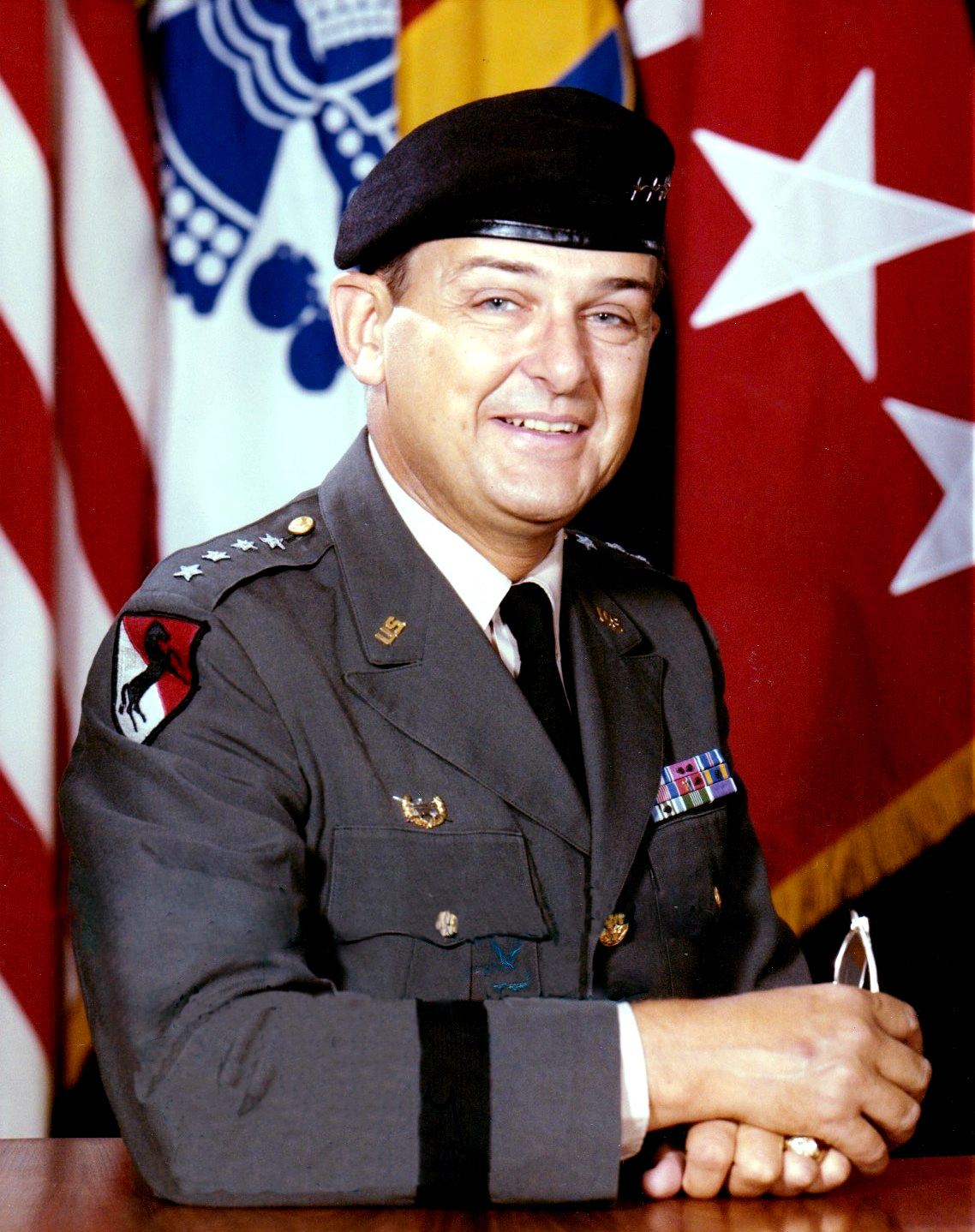
- Starry in c. 1981
- Born: 31 May 1925; New York City, New York, U.S.
- Died: 26 August 2011 (aged 86); Canton, Ohio, U.S.
- Military career
- Allegiance: United States
- Branch: United States Army
- Service years: 1943–1983
- Rank: General
- Commands: United States Readiness Command; United States Army Training and Doctrine Command; V Corps; United States Army Armor Center and School; 11th Armored Cavalry Regiment
- Conflicts: Vietnam War: Cambodian Incursion
- Awards: Defense Distinguished Service Medal; Army Distinguished Service Medal (2); Silver Star; Legion of Merit (3); Distinguished Flying Cross; Soldier's Medal; Bronze Star Medal; Purple Heart

General Donn Albert Starry (31 May 1925 – 26 August 2011) was a United States Army four-star general who served as commanding general of United States Army Training and Doctrine Command from 1977 to 1981, and as commander in chief of United States Readiness Command from 1981 to 1983.

== Early life and education ==
Born in 1925, Starry graduated from the United States Military Academy at West Point in 1948 as a second lieutenant of armor, after having enlisted as a private in 1943. His early career included staff and command positions in the United States, Europe, and Korea. During this same period, he attended the U.S. Army Command and General Staff College, the Armed Forces Staff College, and the Army War College. Starry later earned a master's degree in international affairs from the George Washington University, and several honorary doctoral degrees.

== Military career ==
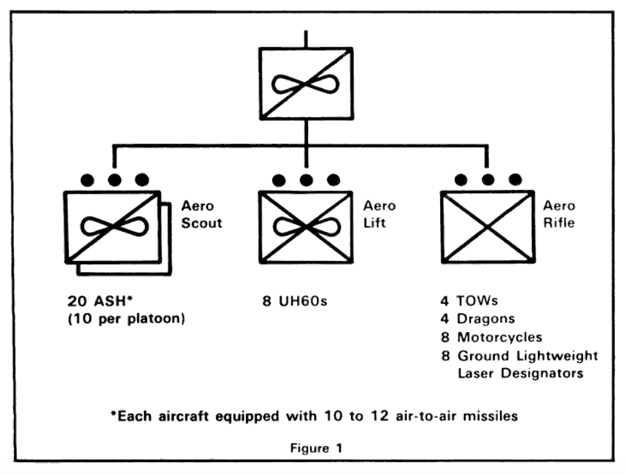
A Starry diagram used by the US Army to schematize battalion-level combat forces

In 1969, Starry commanded the 11th Armored Cavalry Regiment in the Vietnam War and led its attack into Cambodia in May 1970. On May 5, 1970, Starry was wounded by a North Vietnamese grenade that also wounded future Army general Frederick Franks, Jr.

In 1973, Starry became commanding general of United States Army Armor Center and School, and then commander of V Corps (1976–1977), in the Federal Republic of Germany. His conclusion, based on over a hundred battle simulations conducted in Germany, was that the existing DePuy doctrine of "Active Defense" failed; it was termed by one wag "a good way to lose a battle slowly".

Field Manual 100-5, 1982 release

Later, as commander of TRADOC, Starry formulated AirLand Battle doctrine and such minutiae as the Joint Air Attack Team Tactics, which prepared the Army for warfighting into the twenty-first century. Starry released an updated FM100-5 in 1982, and concluded his career as commander of U.S. Readiness Command (1981–1983), retiring from the Army in 1983.

Starry viewed his predecessor at TRADOC, William DePuy, as overly simplistic in his version of Operations, ignoring the human dimension and ultimately rejected it as “too mechanical, too mathematically certain, too specific” in favour of AirLand Battle. Starry realized that the DePuy's "Active Defense" doctrine assumed the Soviet Union would adhere to a doctrine of a massed penetration at a single point. While the V Corps commander in Europe, Starry realized that the Soviet Army modified their doctrine to include multi-pronged attacks across multiple axis of advance. Therefore, Starry focused AirLand Battle on Army and Air Force integration to better strike across both the width and depth of the enemy forces. The new doctrine went beyond just systems and focused on the human dimension and psychological impact of such integrated operations.

Starry's awards and decorations include the Defense Distinguished Service Medal, two awards of the Army Distinguished Service Medal, the Silver Star, the Legion of Merit with two Oak Leaf Clusters, the Distinguished Flying Cross, the Soldier's Medal, the Bronze Star with "V" device, the Purple Heart, and the Air Medal with nine Oak Leaf Clusters.

Starry was also the Honorary Colonel of the Regiment for the 11th Armored Cavalry Regiment. He was also a member of the Defense Science Board for two terms.

=== Bibliography ===
- Mounted Combat in Vietnam.
- Field Manual 100-5, 1982 release.

== Retirement ==
Upon retirement from the army, Starry joined Ford Aerospace, serving first as vice president and general manager of Ford's Space Missions Group, and later as executive vice president of Ford Aerospace and special assistant to the chief executive officer of Braddock Dunn & McDonald. He served as a member of the board of Maxwell Laboratories from 1988 to 1993, and from 1996 to 1998 was chairman of the board as the company became Maxwell Technologies, switching their focus from government to commercial markets. He has also served as chairman of the board of Universal Voltronics in Brookfield, Connecticut. In 1991 he became a Senior Fellow on the faculty of the Joint and Combined Warfighting School at the Joint Forces Staff College.

In retirement, Starry, with George F. Hofmann, edited an anthology of U.S. armor warfare history and doctrine titled Camp Colt to Desert Storm: The History of U.S. Armored Forces. Later his two-volume of select stories, papers, articles, and book excerpts were edited by Lewis Sorley called Press On! Starry was also one of twenty-one signers, all retired flag officers, of a letter to John McCain supporting the Detainee Treatment Act of 2005. His civic projects have included membership on the board of the Eisenhower Foundation in Abilene, Kansas, chairman of the board of the U.S. Cavalry Memorial Foundation, and a member of the board of the Washington Institute of Foreign Affairs. Starry was also the honorary "Father of the Regiment" for the 11th Armored Cavalry Regiment.

Starry died on 26 August 2011, of a rare form of cancer at age 86. He was survived by his second wife, Karen. He was interred in Arlington National Cemetery on 11 January 2012, Section 34, Site 583-A.

== Personal life ==
Starry was married to the former Leatrice (Letty) Gibbs of Kansas City, Kansas. They had four children and seven grandchildren. On 10 April 2010, he celebrated his new marriage to a long-time friend, Karen (Cookie) Deitrick.

Military offices
Preceded by William E. DePuy	Commanding General, United States Army Training and Doctrine Command; 1977–1981	Succeeded by Glenn K. Otis
