= Training manual =

Document used to learn a task or skill

A training manual is a document, a book or booklet of instructions and information, used as an aid to learning a task, skill, or job. Training manuals are widely used, including in business and the military.

A training manual may be particularly useful as:

- an introduction to subject matter prior to training
- an outline to be followed during training
- a reference to subject matter after training
- a general reference document
- a system to reference

A training manual is an important part of a structured training program. It ensures that the content is presented consistently and gathers all essential information—such as skills, processes, and other task requirements—into one comprehensive resource.

Training manuals can be designed to be used as:

- Workbooks – used in training sessions to provide basic information, examples and exercises.
- Self-paced guides: designed for trainees to work through on their own.
- Reference manuals: for containing detailed information on processes and procedures.
- Handouts: provide general information to support training done during the session.
- Job aids: provide step-by-step instructions to be used in the workplace.

== See also ==
- graphic training aids
