= Bernard W. Rogers =

Former Chief of Staff of the United States Army

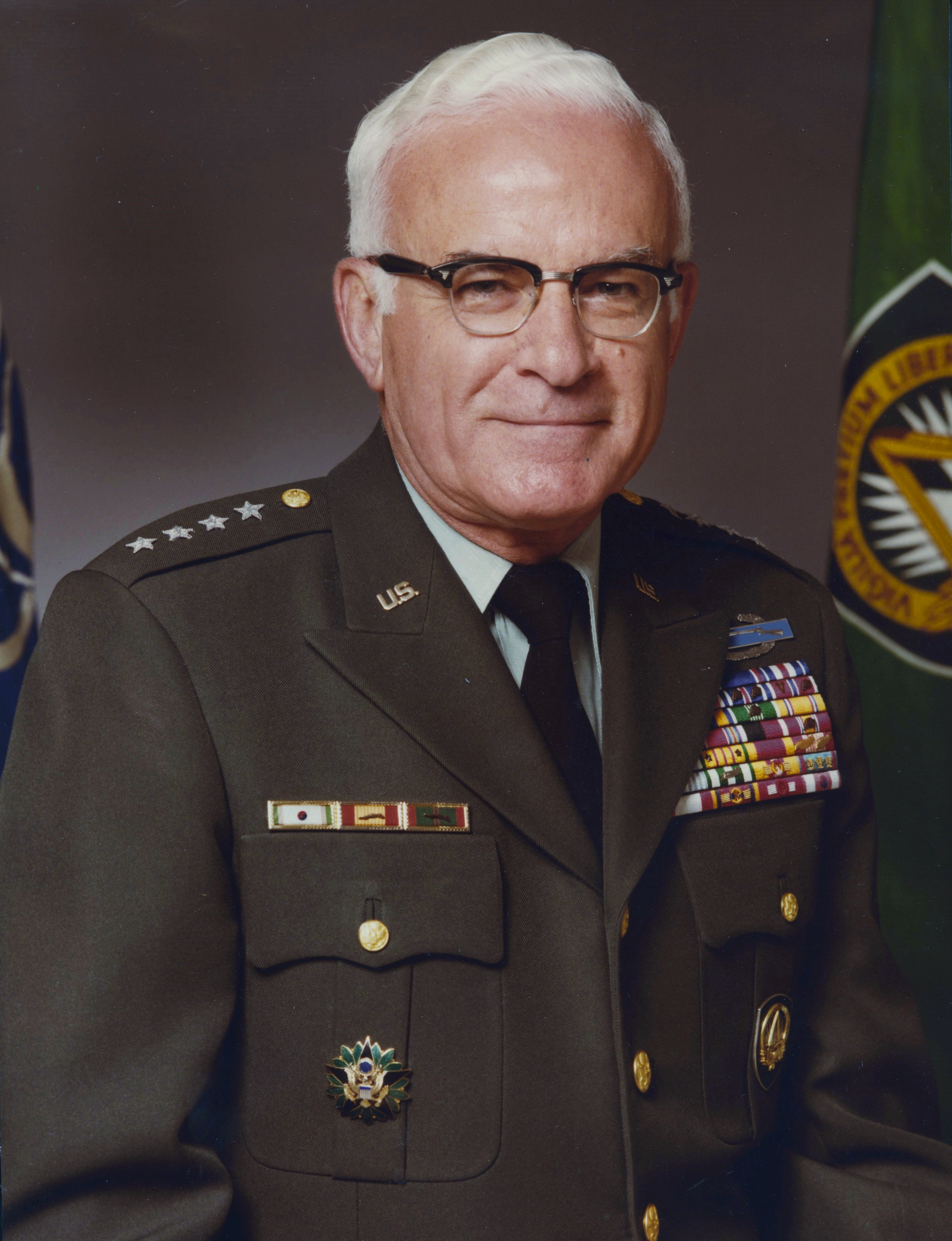
- General Rogers, c. 1979
- Born: 16 July 1921; Fairview, Kansas, U.S.
- Died: 27 October 2008 (aged 87); Falls Church, Virginia, U.S.
- Burial place: West Point Cemetery
- Military career
- Allegiance: United States
- Branch: United States Army
- Service years: 1940–1987
- Rank: General
- Commands: Supreme Allied Commander Europe; United States European Command; Chief of Staff of the United States Army; United States Army Forces Command; 5th Infantry Division (Mechanized); 1st Battle Group, 19th Infantry; 1st Battalion, 23d Infantry Regiment; 3d Battalion, 9th Infantry Regiment
- Conflicts: World War II; Korean War; Vietnam War
- Awards: Distinguished Service Cross; Defense Distinguished Service Medal (2); Army Distinguished Service Medal; Navy Distinguished Service Medal; Air Force Distinguished Service Medal; Silver Star; Legion of Merit (4); Distinguished Flying Cross (3); Bronze Star Medal (2); Air Medal (36); Army Commendation Medal (2)

Bernard William Rogers (16 July 1921 – 27 October 2008) was a United States Army general who served as the 28th Chief of Staff of the United States Army, and later as NATO's Supreme Allied Commander, Europe and Commander in Chief, United States European Command.

Besides the Distinguished Service Cross, Rogers' decorations included the Defense Distinguished Service Medal, the Silver Star, four awards of the Legion of Merit and three awards of the Distinguished Flying Cross.

== Early life and education ==
Rogers was born in Fairview, Kansas on 16 July 1921. He spent a year at Kansas State University, where he was a member of Phi Delta Theta fraternity, before receiving an appointment to the United States Military Academy in 1940, where he was First Captain of the Corps of Cadets. He graduated in June 1943 as Cadet First Captain (first in his class), and was commissioned a second lieutenant of Infantry. He was assigned to the 275th Infantry Regiment, 70th Infantry Division, and attended the officer basic course at the United States Army Infantry School at Fort Benning in preparation for a World War II combat assignment.

== Military career ==
Rogers was promoted to temporary first lieutenant in December 1943. Rather than the combat assignment he expected, Rogers' contribution to the war effort was his return to West Point to teach. He provided instruction in economics, government, and history from 1944 to 1945, and received promotion to temporary captain in February 1945. From 1945 to 1947 he served as aide to the High Commissioner to Austria and commander of the Sixth Army, General Mark W. Clark.

In 1947, Rogers attended the University of Oxford as a Rhodes Scholar, graduating with a Bachelor of Arts in Philosophy, Politics and Economics in 1950 (he was later awarded a Master of Arts in the same subject). During his time at Oxford he was promoted to permanent captain.

=== Korean War ===
Following graduation from Oxford, Rogers was aide to the chief of Army Field Forces from 1950 from 1951, being promoted to temporary major in July 1951. He graduated from the Infantry School advanced course in 1952.

Rogers was then deployed to the Korean War, where he commanded the 3d Battalion, 9th Infantry Regiment from 1952 to 1953, being promoted to temporary lieutenant colonel in August 1953.

=== Interbellum ===
Rogers' next assignment was as aide to the commander in chief and staff intelligence officer of the United Nations and Far East Commands from 1953 to 1954. Rogers returned to the United States and graduated from the Command and General Staff College at Fort Leavenworth in 1955.

Rogers next commanded the 1st Battalion, 23d Infantry Regiment from 1955 to 1956, then served in the Coordination Division, Office of the Chief of Staff from 1956 to 1958. This was followed by duty as executive and senior aide to the chief of staff from 1958 to 1959 and promotion to permanent major January 1959 and temporary colonel in September 1959.

Selected to attend the Army War College, Rogers graduated in 1960 and was appointed to command the 1st Battle Group, 19th Infantry, 24th Infantry Division in Europe from 1960 to 1961. His next assignment in the division was as chief of staff and he also served as chief of the Troop Operation Branch, Operations Division, United States Army, Europe from 1961 to 1962. Rogers' next duty was as military assistant and executive officer to the Chairman of the Joint Chiefs of Staff, General Maxwell Taylor, from 1962 to 1966.

=== Vietnam War ===
Rogers was promoted to permanent lieutenant colonel in January 1964 and temporary brigadier general in October 1966, moving on to become the assistant commander of the 1st Infantry Division in Vietnam from 1966 to 1967. He served under General William E. DePuy and General John H. Hay, and took part in two major offensives, Operation Cedar Falls and Operation Junction City, later writing an account of them at the request of General William Westmoreland. As assistant commander of the 1st Infantry Division, Rogers was awarded the Distinguished Service Cross—the Army's highest award for valor after the Medal of Honor—for leading a successful counterattack against a Vietcong raid on a South Vietnamese special forces camp. He rallied troops on the ground and personally scouted enemy positions from a low-flying helicopter under heavy fire. Rogers was one of only a few individuals to receive the Distinguished Service Cross in Vietnam for actions taken while serving as a general.

After returning from Vietnam, Rogers served two years as Commandant of the Corps of Cadets at West Point from 1967 to 1969, being promoted to permanent colonel in June 1968.

=== Division and senior commands ===
Rogers became one of a select few senior officers chosen for division command, and was assigned commanding officer of the 5th Infantry Division (Mechanized), and Fort Carson, Colorado, from 1969 to 1970. At that time, the 5th "was considered to be one of the most disorganized and unprepared units in the Army. Racial conflict and drug abuse were serious problems. The division also experienced a high turnover rate as soldiers rotating back from their tours of duty in Vietnam served out the remainder of their enlistments."

At a time of falling morale, Rogers made sweeping changes in the daily routine of soldiers by abolishing kitchen duty (KP), reveille, roll call and Friday night "GI parties", in which soldiers scrubbed the barracks for Saturday inspections. On 17 February 1970, Rogers issued Fort Carson Regulation NO. 600–16, "Enlisted Men's Council," which established a two-way channel of communication for enlisted men to relay their grievances and suggestions for improvements. The twenty-member "Fort Carson Enlisted Men's Council" elected as its chair 20-year old combat veteran Specialist 4 Scott M. Gray; at its first meeting the council pointed out eighteen issues and suggested ways of solving them. Rogers concurred with the council and ordered the implementation of all recommended improvement initiatives. After four months, 192 issues were discussed by the council; 107 improvements were recommended; 69 were implemented by Rogers. Later, councils for junior officers and racial minorities to express their concerns were introduced, and a Greenwich Village-style free speech coffeehouse, complete with folk singers, was set up. Old-line officers were aghast, and two decorated brigade commanders were relieved by Rogers from their duties, but his new strategy worked as morale improved, racial tensions de-escalated and re-enlistments rose. Specialist 5 William J. Rosendahl told The New York Times that he, "had just about given up any hope of working for change within the system when Bobby [Senator Robert F. Kennedy] was shot. Now General Rogers has given me a new faith in that at least some people in the power structure are willing to listen." Rogers became known as one of the brightest thinkers in the army after he shared his innovative ways of dealing with disciplinary, racial, drugs and other problems at the annual Army Commanders Conference on 30 November 1970.

Rogers was promoted to temporary major general in February 1970, permanent brigadier general in August 1971, temporary lieutenant general in November 1972 and permanent major general in June 1973. The latter came while serving as Deputy Chief of Staff for Personnel of the Army, from 1972 to 1974. He was promoted to temporary general in November 1974, and was chosen to command the United States Army Forces Command at Fort McPherson from 1974 to 1976.

=== Army Chief of Staff ===
Following this assignment Rogers was selected to be Chief of Staff of the United States Army, a post he held from 1 October 1976 until 21 June 1979, the last World War II veteran to do so. Some highlights of his tenure include supervising the army's move to a 24-division, all-component force; establishing priorities for near-term readiness, midterm modernization, and long-term sustainability; establishing a program to enhance the quality of life of army personnel; and suggesting a limited draft to fill the Individual Ready Reserve.

Rogers continued the reforms he began as a division commander as Chief of Staff, improving training programs and developing plans for a modern "quick-strike" force. He also took steps to make the army more friendly toward women and minorities, calling on commanders to "eliminate any discriminatory handling of soldiers." He also authorized the formation of Delta Force, the first United States military counter-terrorist unit.

Rogers was responsible for starting the army's renaissance after falling into a state of low morale and readiness following the Vietnam War. His innovations and reforms were continued under his successor, General Edward C. Meyer.

=== Supreme Allied Commander ===
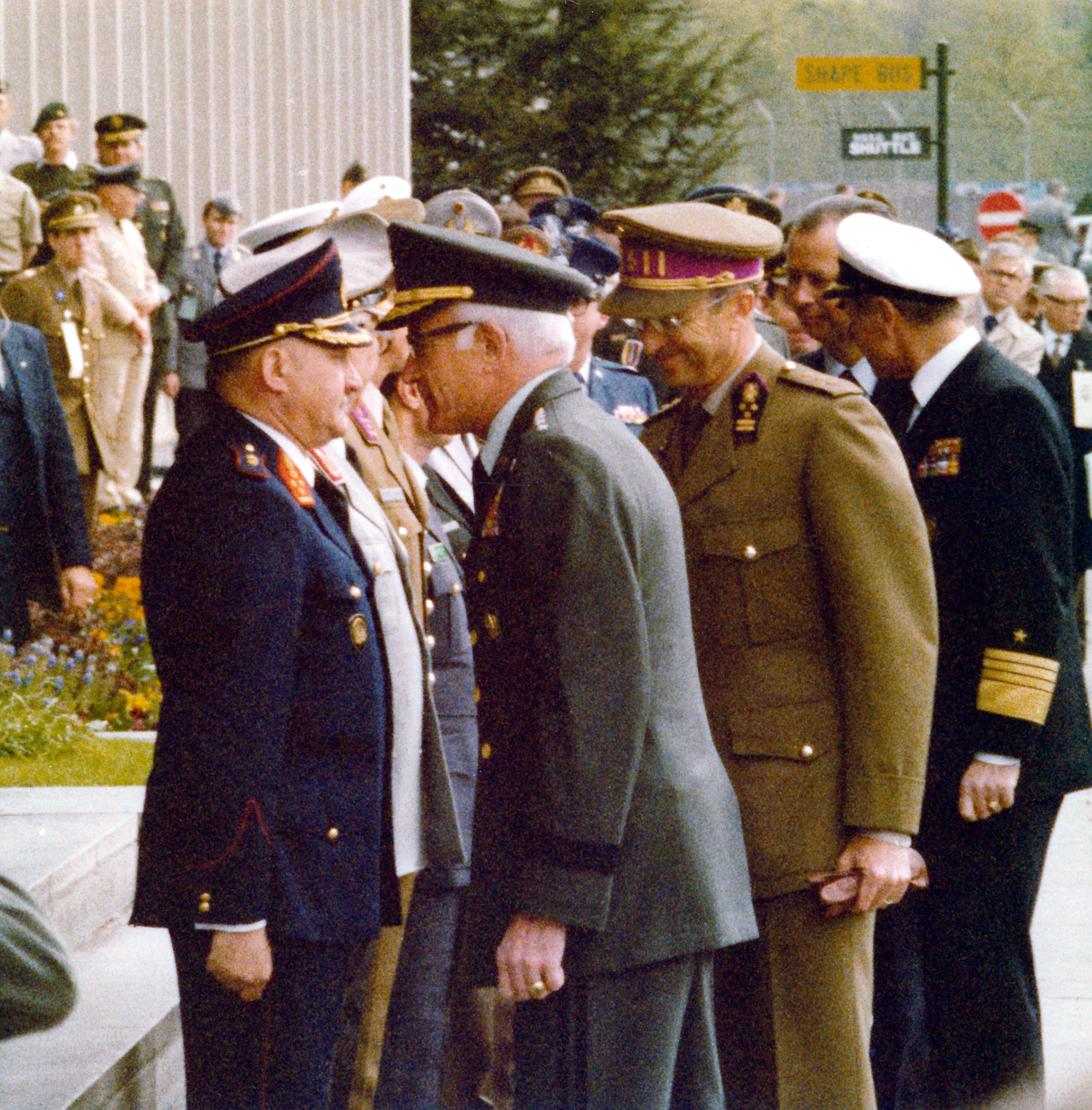
General Rogers presenting King Baudouin of the Belgians to the national military representatives and to the national representative of the Belgian gendarmerie to SHAPE

Rogers was appointed by President Jimmy Carter as Supreme Allied Commander Europe (SACEUR), North Atlantic Treaty Organization in June 1979 and, concomitantly, as Commander in Chief of United States European Command. He assumed his duties as SACEUR on 1 July 1979.

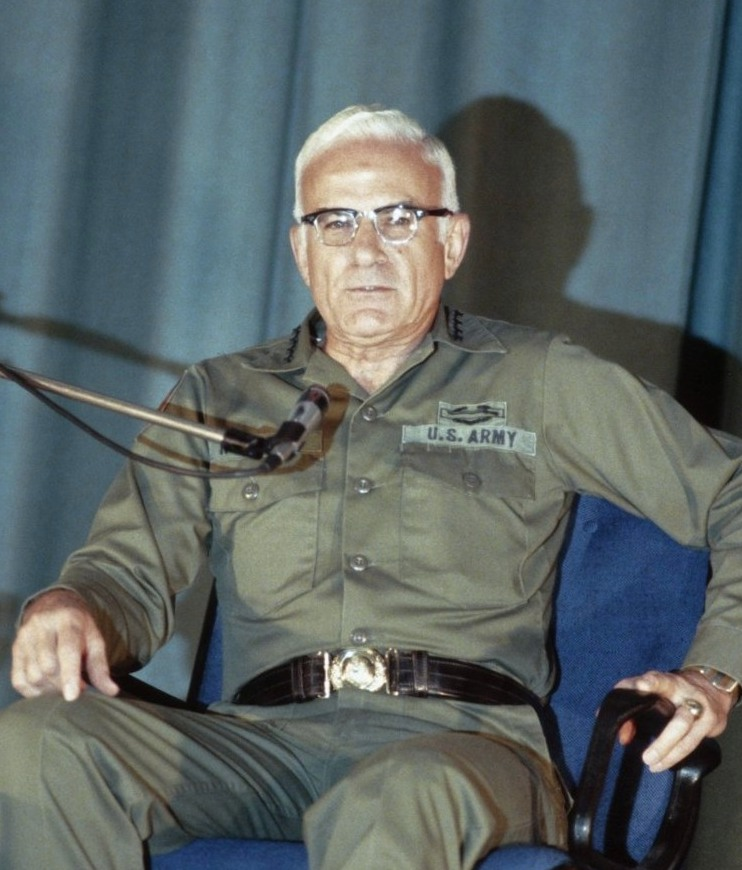
Rogers in Germany in 1983

In his role as SACEUR, Rogers would have been in command of all NATO forces in the event of an attack by the Soviet-led Warsaw Pact on Western Europe. His emphasis on combat readiness led some soldiers to comment that there were two armies – one in Europe ready for war and one in the United States that was not.

Despite his charmed career, Rogers was eager to leave the bureaucratic labyrinth of the Pentagon behind when he assumed his NATO post in Belgium.

You've heard that phrase from a country song that goes: "Happiness is Lubbock, Texas, in the rearview mirror"? ... Well, for me, happiness is the Pentagon in the rearview mirror.

— Bernard W. Rogers

When the Reagan administration signed a treaty with the Soviet Union requiring each side to withdraw intermediate-range missiles from Europe, Rogers called the agreement "foolish." He said the Warsaw Pact's superiority in foot soldiers and conventional weapons left NATO forces at risk of being quickly overrun. His stance drew a pointed rebuke in 1987 from Secretary of State, George P. Shultz, who called the general's comments "way out of line." Rogers soon retired. He served as SACEUR for eight years, longer than any other NATO Supreme Allied Commander. He retired from the army after 47 years of service in June 1987.

Historiographers note that the implementation of AirLand Battle doctrine that he brought with him to NATO was the source of inter-allies friction. The then-current NATO battlefield strategy for the conventional defense of Central Europe was summarized in a 1987 thesis.

SACEUR Rogers was troubled by NATO's numerically smaller military forces in comparison to the Warsaw Pact. Unless there were unexpected changes, Rogers believed he would need to resort to nuclear weapons to try to halt the Soviet/WP advance. To improve NATO's conventional defences, Rogers proposed a novel idea he labelled "Follow-on Forces Attack," which would counter a Warsaw Pact invasion by making deep conventional attacks the enemy's second and third echelon forces to prevent them from reaching NATO's defensive positions.

== Later life and death ==
After his retirement in 1987, Rogers was a director of the Council on Foreign Relations and the Atlantic Council of the United States. He served on the boards of the USO and the Association of the United States Army and was a consultant and director to several companies, including Coca-Cola and General Dynamics.

Rogers died in 2008 at Inova Fairfax Hospital, Virginia, after suffering a heart attack. He was survived by his wife of 63 years, Ann E. Rogers of McLean; three children, retired United States Army Colonel Michael W. Rogers of Manassas, Virginia, Diane Opperman of Arlington and Susan Kroetch of Alexandria; a sister; a brother; six grandchildren; and three great-grandchildren.

== Personal life ==
Rogers married Ann Ellen Jones in 1944. He was an Honorary Director of The Atlantic Council of the United States, and sat on the Association of the United States Army's Council of Trustees. He was also a supporter of the Comprehensive Test Ban Treaty. He was an Honorary Fellow of University College, Oxford, a member of the Council on Foreign Relations, of Phi Delta Theta fraternity, and a Patron Councilor of the Atlantic Council of the United States.

Other honors and awards he has received include:

- Golden Plate Award of the American Academy of Achievement, 1980
- Distinguished Service Citation, Honorary Alumni Citees, University of Kansas Alumni Association, 1984
- H.H. Arnold Award, Air Force Association, 1985
- Distinguished Graduate Award, USMA Association of Graduates, 1995
- George C. Marshall Medal, United States Army Association, 1999

== Awards ==
=== Individual awards ===

1st Row	Distinguished Service Cross		
2nd Row	Defense Distinguished Service Medal with oak leaf cluster	Army Distinguished Service Medal	Navy Distinguished Service Medal
3rd Row	Air Force Distinguished Service Medal	Silver Star	Legion of Merit with three oak leaf clusters
4th Row	Distinguished Flying Cross with two oak leaf clusters	Bronze Star Medal with "V" device and oak leaf cluster	Air Medal with "V" device and numeral 36
5th Row	Army Commendation Medal with oak leaf cluster	American Defense Service Medal	American Campaign Medal
6th Row	World War II Victory Medal	Army of Occupation Medal with "Germany" clasp	National Defense Service Medal oak leaf cluster
7th Row	Korean Service Medal with two campaign stars	Vietnam Service Medal with two campaign stars	National Order of Vietnam
8th Row	Vietnam Gallantry Cross with palm	United Nations Korea Medal	Republic of Vietnam Campaign Medal

=== Unit awards ===

Korean Presidential Unit Citation, Vietnam Gallantry Cross Unit Citation, Vietnam Civil Actions Unit Citation

=== Other awards ===
- Combat Infantryman Badge
- Office of the Joint Chiefs of Staff Identification Badge
- Army Staff Identification Badge
- 1st Infantry Division "Combat Patch"

== See also ==
- List of United States Army four-star generals
- List of Supreme Allied Commanders Europe

Military offices
Preceded by Frederick C. Weyand	Chief of Staff of the United States Army; 1976–1979	Succeeded by Edward C. Meyer
Preceded by Alexander Haig	Supreme Allied Commander Europe; 1979–1987	Succeeded by John Galvin
