= Joint Air Attack Team Tactics =

US military doctrine

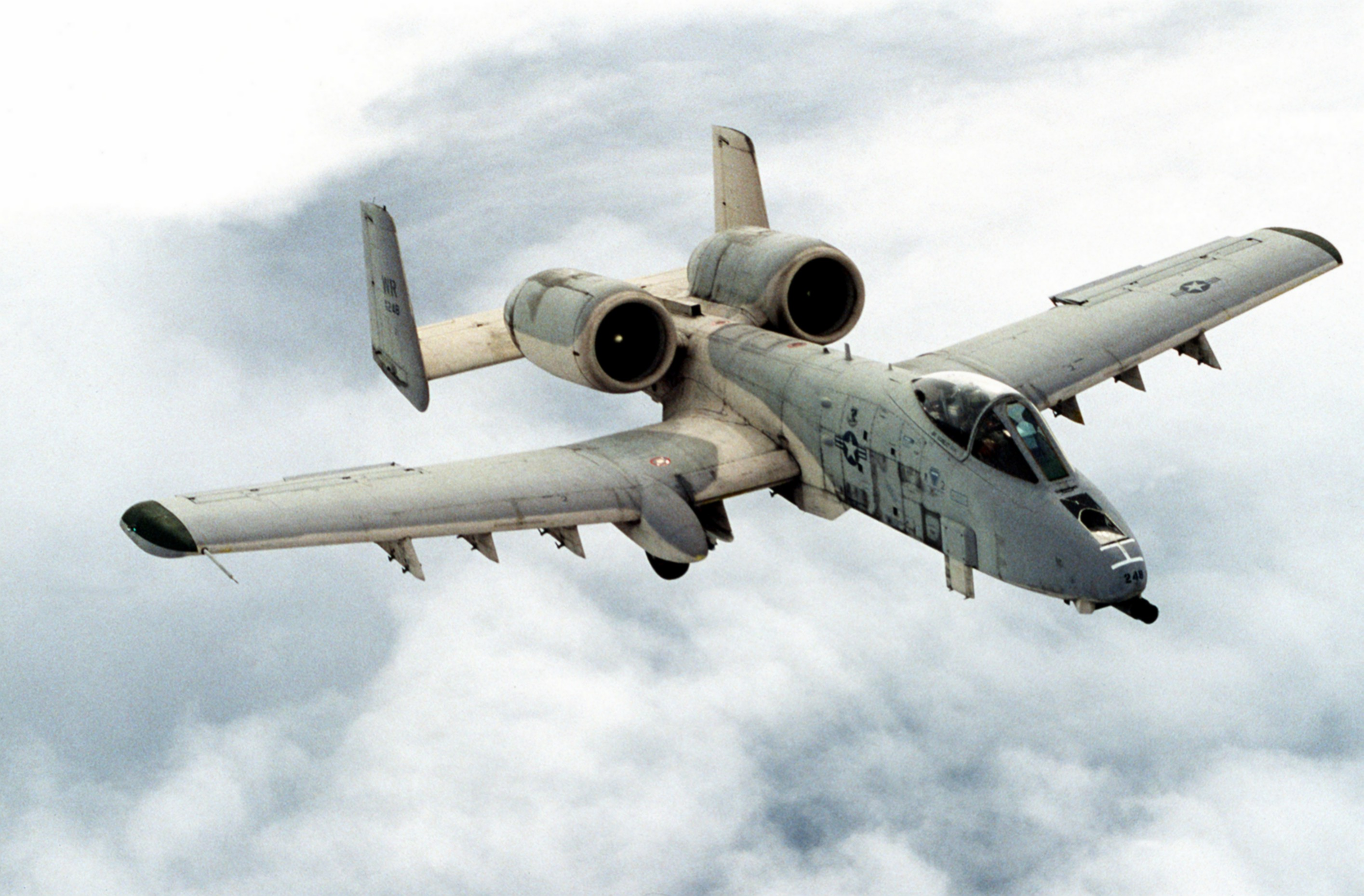
A Fairchild Republic A-10A Thunderbolt II in flight on 1 September 1980; this aircraft was assigned to the 81st Tactical Fighter Wing, which was based at RAF Bentwaters and RAF Woodbridge until the end of the Cold War in 1993

Joint Air Attack Team Tactics (JAATT) was a doctrine, taught by the US military Tactical Air Command "in a combined arms team concept of operations" through TRADOC. The tactic was founded on both the A-10 and the OH-58 aircraft. "Using nap-of-the-earth flying techniques, helicopters can use even small terrain features for concealment. The helicopter-borne Forward Air Controller (FAC) has better survivability than his fixed-wing FAC counterpart, near the forward edge of the battle area."

== Synopsis ==
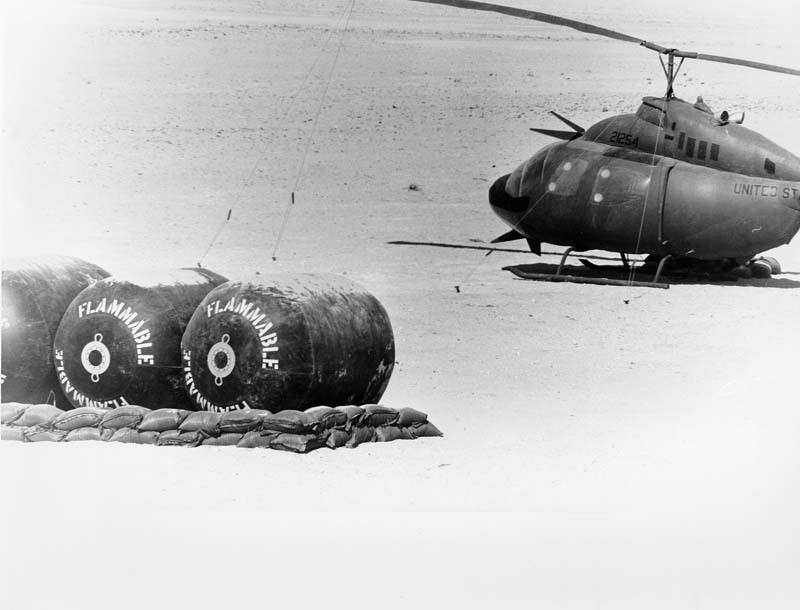
Simulated OH-58C Kiowa helicopter and simulated fuel blivets during a deception operation on 10 November 1990 carried out by the XVIII Airborne Corps Deception Cell. This simulated forward arming and refueling point (FARP) at TL 139512 in the Eastern Province of Saudi Arabia was approximately 45 kilometers northwest of An Nuariya.

General Donn A. Starry at the Combined Arms Center was responsible for the promotion of the doctrine. During his time at Fort Leavenworth the Center released many instructional films.

The idea was to "locate, engage and destroy tanks and other armoured vehicles" and was taught from November 1978.

The Rapid Deployment Force (RDF) worked together with TAC through the joint Air-Land Force Applications Agency at Langley Air Force Base, on a variety of projects. The two services continued development and training of JAATT, a team concept that had proved effective in providing Air Force A-10 aircraft and Army attack helicopters a much higher degree of survivability than when each operated independently. The Applications Agency prepared a draft joint counter-air and air defense interim operational concept, and representatives of the two services agreed to a joint operational concept for suppressing enemy air defense.

The British Army would seem to have adopted these tactics, especially in conjunction with the American base at RAF Bentwaters. The husband of US Senator Kelly Ayotte was a key instructor of this doctrine while he served from 1990 with the Massachusetts Air National Guard.
