= Yury Gorkov =

Soviet and Russian military leader (1928-2005)

Yury Aleksandrovich Gorkov
- Born: February 7, 1928; Bar-Sloboda, Ulyanovsk Oblast, Russian Soviet Federative Socialist Republic, Soviet Union
- Military career
- Allegiance: Soviet Union; Russia
- Branch: Anti-aircraft warfare
- Service years: 1947 — 1988
- Rank: Colonel-General
- Awards: Order of the Red Banner of Labour

Yury Aleksandrovich Gorkov (February 7, 1928 — June 27, 2005) (Russian: Юрий Александрович Горьков) was a Soviet and Russian military leader, historian and colonel general. He was a student of professor Viktor Anfilov.

== Biography ==
He was born February 7, 1928 in the village of Bar-Sloboda, Sursky District, Ulyanovsk Oblast. During World War II, he was on the labor front. Upon graduation in 1949 from the Gorky School of Anti-Aircraft Artillery, he served in Soviet Air Defense Forces as a platoon commander of an anti-aircraft battery and chief of staff of the anti-aircraft artillery regiment.

In 1962, he graduated from the Zhukov Air and Space Defence Academy, and in 1971, he graduated from the Military Academy of the General Staff. He then commanded an anti-aircraft artillery regiment and an air defense division brigade. In 1973 he became a Chief of Staff and from 1979 to 1983 he was the Commander of the 10th Independent Air Defense Army (Arkhangelsk). From 1983-1988 he was Chief of Staff of the 1st Deputy Commander of the Troops of the Moscow Air Defense District. In 1988, he retired as a colonel-general and worked as a consultant of the Historical Archive and Military Memorial Center of the General Staff.

He died on June 27, 2005. He is buried in Moscow in the Troyekurovskoye Cemetery.

== Family ==
His son Alexander Gorkov (born January 10, 1953) is a retired lieutenant general. He was the head of anti-aircraft missile forces of the Russian Air Force from 2000 to 2008.

His daughter Tatiana Yurievna Gorkova, is the dean of the economic faculty at Moscow State University of Medicine and Dentistry, the Head of the Department of Finance and Investments, a professor, and has a Doctor of Economic Sciences.

== Awards ==
- Order of the October Revolution
- Order of the Red Banner of Labour
- Jubilee Medal "In Commemoration of the 100th Anniversary of the Birth of Vladimir Ilyich Lenin"
- Jubilee Medal "Twenty Years of Victory in the Great Patriotic War 1941–1945"
- Medal "In Commemoration of the 850th Anniversary of Moscow"
- Jubilee Medal "30 Years of the Soviet Army and Navy"
- Jubilee Medal "40 Years of the Armed Forces of the USSR"
- Jubilee Medal "50 Years of the Armed Forces of the USSR"
- Jubilee Medal "60 Years of the Armed Forces of the USSR"
- Jubilee Medal "70 Years of the Armed Forces of the USSR"
- Medal "Veteran of the Armed Forces of the USSR"
- Medal "For Impeccable Service" First Degree
- Medal "For Impeccable Service" Second Degree
- Medal "For Impeccable Service" Third Degree

== Literary Publications ==
- Горьков Ю. А. Кремль. Ставка. Генштаб. — Тверь: Ред.-изд. фирма "РИФ", 1995.
- Горьков Ю. А. Государственный Комитет Обороны постановляет (1941-1945). — М.: ОЛМА-Пресс, 2002. — 572 с. — (Серия "Архив").; ISBN 5-224-03313-6
- Горьков Ю. А. Полководческий гений Георгия Жукова. — М.: Академ-Проект, 2005. — 699 с.; ISBN 5-8291-0532-2
- Горьков Ю. А. Мог ли пасть Берлин в феврале 1945 года. // «Военно-исторический журнал». — 1990. — № 5. — С.13-20.
- Горьков Ю. А. Готовил ли Сталин упреждающий удар против Гитлера в 1941 г. // «Новая и новейшая история». — 1993. — № 3.
- Горьков Ю. А., Сёмин Ю. Н. Конец глобальной лжи. // «Военно-исторический журнал». — 1996. — № 2—6.
