= Field Manual 100-5 =

US Army field manual

Field Manual 100-5 (FM100-5) is a serial publication of the US Army. In 1997, the 1986 edition was termed "the primary tool for the self-education and professional development required to achieve tactical competence." In 1939 it was said to contain the principles of troop leading and combat of the combined arms in maneuver warfare and constitutes the basis of instruction of all arms and services for field service.

== History ==
FM100-5 was published on 1 October 1939 by newly-hired Chief of Staff General George C. Marshall.

It was updated again in 1941 after the Blitzkrieg of General Guderian had been digested.

It was republished by Marshall on 15 June 1944, and then again in 1949.

William DePuy signed off on the 1976 edition. DePuy supervised the Army's effort to learn lessons from the Yom Kippur War. He promoted an attrition-based doctrine called "Active Defense". The 1976 edition of FM100-5 was the inaugural publication of the United States Army Training and Doctrine Command.

AirLand Battle was first promulgated in the 1982 version of FM 100-5, and revised the FM 100-5 version of 1986. By 1993 the Army had seen off the Soviet threat and moved on.

After the 1986 update, 1993 and 1998 saw a different focus.

== See also ==
- List of United States Army Field Manuals
