= Military doctrine =

Expression of how military forces operate

Military doctrine is the expression of how military forces contribute to campaigns, major operations, battles, and engagements. A military doctrine outlines what military means should be used, how forces should be structured, where forces should be deployed, and the modes of cooperation between types of forces. "Joint doctrine" refers to the doctrines shared and aligned by multinational forces or joint service operations.

There are three broad categories of military doctrines: (1) Offensive doctrines aim to punish an adversary, (2) Defensive doctrines aim to deny an adversary, and (3) Deterrent doctrines aim to disarm an adversary. Different military doctrines have different implications for world politics. For example, offensive doctrines tend to lead to arms races and conflicts.

== Defining doctrine ==
NATO's definition of doctrine, used unaltered by many member nations, is:

Fundamental principles by which the military forces guide their actions in support of objectives. It is authoritative but requires judgement in application.

In 1998 the Canadian Army stated:

Military doctrine is a formal expression of military knowledge and thought, that the army accepts as being relevant at a given time, which covers the nature of conflict, the preparation of the army for conflict, and the method of engaging in conflict to achieve success ... it is descriptive rather than prescriptive, requiring judgement in application. It does not establish dogma or provide a checklist of procedures, but is rather an authoritative guide, describing how the army thinks about fighting, not how to fight. As such it attempts to be definitive enough to guide military activity, yet versatile enough to accommodate a wide variety of situations.

A U.S. Air Force Air University staff study in 1948 defined military doctrine functionally as "those concepts, principles, policies, tactics, techniques, practices, and procedures which are essential to efficiency in organizing, training, equipping, and employing its tactical and service units".

A U.S. Army essay written in 2016 similarly defined military doctrine as "consist[ing] of tactics, techniques, and procedures (TTPs)".

In 2005 Gary Sheffield of the Defence Studies Department of King's College London/JSCSC quoted J F C Fuller's 1923 definition of doctrine as the "central idea of an army".

In 1965 the Soviet Dictionary of Basic Military Terms defined military doctrine as "a state's officially accepted system of scientifically founded views on the nature of modern wars and the use of the armed forces in them. ... Military doctrine has two aspects: social-political and military-technical." The social-political side "encompasses all questions concerning methodology, economic, and social bases, the political goals of war. It is the defining and the more stable side." The other side, the military-technical, must accord with the political goals. It includes the "creation of military structure, technical equipping of the armed forces, their training, definition of forms and means of conducting operations and war as a whole".

== Relationship between doctrine and strategy ==
Military doctrine is a key component of grand strategy.

NATO's definition of strategy is "presenting the manner in which military power should be developed and applied to achieve national objectives or those of a group of nations." The official definition of strategy by the United States Department of Defense is: "Strategy is a prudent idea or set of ideas for employing the instruments of national power in a synchronized and integrated fashion to achieve national or multinational objectives."

Military strategy provides the rationale for military operations. Field Marshal Viscount Alan Brooke, Chief of the Imperial General Staff and co-chairman of the Anglo-US Combined Chiefs of Staff Committee for most of the Second World War, described the art of military strategy as: "to derive from the [policy] aim a series of military objectives to be achieved: to assess these objectives as to the military requirements they create, and the pre-conditions which the achievement of each is likely to necessitate: to measure available and potential resources against the requirements and to chart from this process a coherent pattern of priorities and a rational course of action."

Instead, doctrine seeks to provide a common conceptual framework for a military service:

- what the service perceives itself to be ("Who are we?")
- what its mission is ("What do we do?")
- how the mission is to be carried out ("How do we do that?")
- how the mission has been carried out in history ("How did we do that in the past?")
- other questions.

In the same way, doctrine is neither operations nor tactics. It serves as a conceptual framework uniting all three levels of warfare.

Doctrine reflects the judgments of professional military officers, and to a lesser but important extent civilian leaders, about what is and is not militarily possible and necessary.

Factors to consider include:

- military technology
- national geography
- the capabilities of adversaries
- the capability of one's own organization

== Military doctrine by country ==
=== China ===
Chinese military doctrine is influenced by a number of sources including an indigenous classical military tradition characterized by strategists such as Sun Tzu and modern strategists such as Mao Zedong, along with Western and Soviet influences. One distinctive characteristic of Chinese military science is that it places emphasis on the relationship between the military and society and views military force as merely one part of an overarching grand strategy.

According to French newspaper Le Monde, the Chinese nuclear doctrine is to maintain a nuclear force allowing it to deter and respond to a nuclear attack. However, new evolutions show that China could allow use of its nuclear arsenal in more situations.

=== France ===
Following the defeat of the French Army in the Franco-Prussian War, the French military, as part of its movements to increase professionalism, emphasized officer training at the École supérieure de guerre, under the direction of its commandant, Ferdinand Foch, who began developing a consistent doctrine for handling armies, corps, and divisions. Foch's 1906 work, Des principes de la guerre (translated by Hilaire Belloc as The Principles of War) expressed this doctrine.

We have then, a doctrine. All the brains have been limbered up and regard all questions from an identical point of view. The fundamental idea of the problem being known, each one will solve the problem in his own fashion, and these thousand fashions, we may very well be sure, will act to direct all their efforts to a common objective.

Prior to WWI, France had an offensive military doctrine.

In the aftermath of WWI, France adopted a defensive military doctrine where the Maginot Line played a central role in its deterrence of Germany.

=== Germany ===
Prussian doctrine was published as Regulations for the Instruction of the Troops in Field Service and the Exercises of the larger Units of the 17th June, 1870. The doctrine was revised in 1887 and published in English in 1893 as The Order of Field Service of the German Army, by Karl Kaltenborn und Stachau, and once again in 1908 as Felddienst Ordnung ("Field Service Regulations").

Prior to WWI, Germany had an offensive military doctrine exemplified by the Schlieffen Plan. Germany also devoted considerable resources to building a fleet of battleships, which provoked fears among European powers. During World War II, Germany deployed an operational strategy sometimes referred to as Blitzkrieg in its offensives against Poland and France.

German military doctrine incorporates the concept of Auftragstaktik (Mission-type tactics), which can be seen as a doctrine within which formal rules can be selectively suspended in order to overcome "friction". Carl von Clausewitz stated that "Everything in war is very simple but the simplest thing is difficult". Problems will occur with misplaced communications, troops going to the wrong location, delays caused by weather, etc., and it is the duty of the commander to do his best to overcome them. Auftragstaktik encourages commanders to exhibit initiative, flexibility and improvisation while in command.

=== India ===
The current combat doctrine of the Indian Army is based on the effective combined utilization of holding formations and strike formations. In the case of an attack, the holding formations would contain the enemy and strike formations would counter-attack to neutralize enemy forces. In the case of an Indian attack, the holding formations would pin enemy forces down whilst the strike formations attack at a point of Indian choosing.

India's nuclear doctrine follows the policy of credible minimum deterrence, No first strike, No use of nuclear weapons on Non-nuclear states and Massive nuclear retaliation in case deterrence fails.

India has recently adopted a new war doctrine known as "Cold Start" and its military has conducted exercises several times since then based on this doctrine. "Cold Start" involves joint operations between India's three services and integrated battle groups for offensive operations. A key component is the preparation of India's forces to be able to quickly mobilize and take offensive actions without crossing the enemy's nuclear-use threshold. A leaked US diplomatic cable disclosed that it was intended to be taken off the shelf and implemented within a 72-hour period during a crisis.

=== Israel ===
==== Strategic doctrine ====
Israel's military doctrine is formed by its small size and lack of strategic depth. To compensate, it relies on deterrence, including through a presumed nuclear weapons arsenal. It tries to overcome its quantitative disadvantage by staying qualitatively superior. Its doctrine is based on a strategy of defense but is operationally offensive, by pre-empting enemy threats and securing a quick, decisive victory if deterrence fails. Israel maintains a heightened state of readiness, advanced early warning systems, and a robust military intelligence capability to ensure attackers cannot take advantage of Israel's lack of strategic depth. Early warning and speedy victory is also desired because the Israel Defense Forces rely heavily on reservists during major wars; lengthy mobilization of reservists is costly to the Israeli economy. Israeli doctrine is constructed with the assumption that Israel would be largely self-sufficient in its war-fighting, without nearby allies to assist.

Israel's emphasis on operational offense was espoused by its first prime minister, David Ben-Gurion, as early as 1948 (during the 1948 Arab–Israeli war):

If [the Arabs] attack us as they did this time, we shall transfer the war to the gates of their country. ... We do not intend to conduct ... a static defensive war at the venue where we were attacked. If they attack us again, in the future, we want the war to be waged not in our country, but in the enemy's country, and we want to be not on the defensive but on the attack.

Yitzhak Rabin, who was Chief of the IDF Staff during the Six-Day War, offered a similar explanation for Israel's pre-emptive beginning to the war:

The basic philosophy of Israel was not to initiate war, unless an act of war was carried out against us. We then lived within the lines prior to the Six-Day War, lines that gave no depth to Israel—and therefore, Israel was in a need, whenever there would be a war, to go immediately on the offensive—to carry the war to the enemy's land.

==== Tactical doctrine ====
IDF command has been decentralized since the early days of the state, with junior commanders receiving broad authority within the context of mission-type orders. Israeli junior officer training has emphasized the need to make quick decisions in battle to prepare them appropriately for maneuver warfare.

=== Soviet Union ===
Soviet doctrine was greatly influenced by M. V. Frunze.

In Soviet times, theorists emphasised both the political and "military-technical" sides of military doctrine, while from the Soviet point of view, Westerners ignored the political side. However, the political side of Soviet military doctrine, Western commentators Harriet F Scott and William Scott said, "best explained Soviet moves in the international arena".

=== Sweden ===
In the 2000s and early 2010s, the Moderate Party–led governments transformed the Swedish Armed Forces from a Cold War posture of defence to one of participation in international operations. The assumption was that Sweden's homeland would face minimal external threats. Supreme Commander Sverker Göranson estimates that as of 2014, Swedish forces could resist a limited enemy attack for only one week.

The annexation of Crimea by the Russian Federation and the subsequent Russian invasion of Ukraine has stirred debate within Sweden that a return to significant defensive forces and a closer alliance with NATO is necessary in the wake of Russia's actions in Ukraine. On 7 March 2024, Sweden joined NATO.

=== United Kingdom ===
For some 280 years the British Army did not have a formal 'Military Doctrine', although a huge number of publications dealing with tactics, operations and administration had been produced. Field Service Regulations were issued by the War Office in 1909, 1917, 1923, 1930, and 1935. Similar publications under various names were subsequently published. However, during his tenure as Chief of the General Staff (1985–89) General Sir Nigel Bagnall directed that British Military Doctrine was to be prepared, and tasked Colonel (later General) Timothy Granville-Chapman (an artillery officer who had been his Military Assistant in Headquarters 1st British Corps) to prepare it. The first edition of British Military Doctrine (BMD) was published in 1988. It led to the Royal Navy and Royal Air Force developing their own maritime and air-power doctrines. However, in 1996 the first edition of British Defence Doctrine (BDD) was published, drawing heavily on the BMD. The Army adopted BDD as their Military Doctrine. The fourth edition of BDD was published in 2011; it uses the NATO definition of doctrine.

NATO underpins the defence of the UK and its Allies, while also providing deployable expeditionary capabilities to support and defend UK interests further afield. However, until recently, most NATO doctrine has been mirrored by equivalent, but different, national Joint Doctrines. This has often caused a dilemma for UK Armed Forces committed to operations as part of a NATO-based coalition.

In 2012, the Chief of Defence Staff and Permanent Undersecretary for Defence issued direction on how the UK contribution to NATO could be improved, stating that 'We should use NATO doctrine wherever we can, and ensure coherence of UK doctrine with NATO wherever we cannot.'

The 2014 edition of Joint Doctrine Publication (JDP) 0-01 UK Defence Doctrine reflects this change in policy.

However, the British Army had formal publications for a long time, and these amounted to its doctrine. Field Service Regulations (FSR), on the Prussian pattern, were published in 1906 and with amendments and replacement editions lasted into the Second World War. They required each arm and service to produce their own specific publications to give effect to FSR. After the Second World War FSR were replaced by various series of manuals, again with specific training pamphlets for each arm and service. These deal with operational and tactical matters.

The current capstone publication for the army is Army Doctrine Publication Operations alongside maritime and air-power equivalents and joint warfare publications all under the umbrella of BDD. The four layers constituting "land doctrine" are summarised as:

- British Defence Doctrine – provides philosophy
- Joint (and Allied) Operational Doctrine and Capstone Environmental Doctrine (JDP 01 Joint Operations AJP-01 Allied Joint Operations ADP Operations – provides principles
- Joint Functional and Thematic Doctrine such as JDP 5-00 Campaign Planning and JDP 3-40 Security and Stabalisation provide doctrine on specific areas or themes. JDP 5-00 JDP 3-40
- Army Field Manual (two volumes) – provides practices
- Land component handbooks and special to arm publications – provide procedures

The Army Field Manual comprises Volumes 1 (Combined Arms Operations) in 12 parts led by "Formation Tactics" and "Battlegroup Tactics", and Volume 2 (Operations in Specific Environments) in 6 parts (desert, urban, etc.).

BDD is divided into two parts: "Defence Context" and "Military Doctrine". Defence Context deals with two matters. First, the relationship between Defence policy and military strategy, and—while highlighting the utility of force – emphasizes the importance of addressing security issues through a comprehensive, rather than an exclusively military, approach. Second it expounds the Nature of and the Principles of War, the three Levels of Warfare (Strategic, Operational and Tactical) and its evolving character. The ten Principles of War are a refined and extended version of those that appeared in FSR between the two world wars and based on the work of JFC Fuller.

The Military Doctrine states that it comprises national Joint Doctrine, Higher Level Environmental Doctrine, Tactical Doctrine, Allied Doctrine and doctrine adopted or adapted from ad hoc coalition partners. The part deals with three matters. First it describes the likely employment of the British Armed Forces in pursuit of Defence policy aims and objectives. Next it explains the three components of fighting power (conceptual, physical and moral components) and the criticality of the operating context to its effective application. Finally it describes the British approach to the conduct of military operations—"the British way of war". This includes mission command, the manoeuvrist approach and a warfighting ethos that requires accepting risks.

The BDD is linked to a variety of unclassified policy documents such as Defence White Papers and Strategic Defence Reviews, as well as classified Strategic Planning Guidance. The current, 2011, edition of BDD is underpinned by recent developmental and conceptual publications such as The DCDC Global Strategic Trends Programme 2007–2036 and The High Level Operational Conceptual Framework, which comprises specific army, navy and air force publications.

=== United States ===
In the period between the Napoleonic Wars and the First World War, doctrine was defined by the War Department in "Field Service Regulations". In addition, many officers wrote military manuals that were printed by private publishers, such as Hardee's Tactics, used by both Confederate and Union forces. General George B. McClellan wrote a cavalry manual, Regulations and Instructions for the Field Service of the U.S. Cavalry, in 1862.

The General Staff became responsible for writing Field Service Regulations. They were published in 1908, were revised in 1913 and again in 1914 based on experiences of European powers in the first months of the war.

As late as 1941 U.S. Army doctrine was published in Field Service Regulations – Operations. This designation was dropped and replaced by U.S. Army Field Manuals (FM).

==== Sources ====
The United States Constitution invests Congress with the powers to provide for the common defense and general welfare of the United States and to raise and support armies. Title 10 of the United States Code states what Congress expects the Army, in conjunction with the other Services, to accomplish. This includes: Preserve the peace and security and provide for the defense of the United States, its territories and possessions, and any areas it occupies; Support national policies; Implement national objectives; Overcome any nations responsible for aggressive acts that imperil the peace and security of the United States.

==== Key concepts ====
Most modern US doctrine is based around the concept of power projection and full spectrum operations, which combine offensive, defensive, and stability or civil support operations simultaneously as part of an interdependent joint or combined force to seize, retain, and exploit the initiative. They employ synchronized action—lethal and nonlethal—proportional to the mission and informed by a thorough understanding of all dimensions of the operational environment.

Offensive operations defeat and destroy enemy forces, and seize terrain, resources, and population centers. They impose the commander's will on the enemy. Defensive operations defeat an enemy attack, gain time, economize forces, and develop conditions favorable for offensive or stability operations.

Stability operations encompass various military missions, tasks, and activities conducted abroad to maintain or reestablish a safe and secure environment, provide essential governmental services, emergency infrastructure reconstruction, and humanitarian relief. Civil support operations are support tasks and missions to homeland civil authorities for domestic emergencies, and for designated law enforcement and other activities. This includes operations dealing with the consequences of natural or manmade disasters, accidents, and incidents within the homeland.

Under President Lyndon Johnson it was stated that the US armed forces should be able to fight two—at one point, two-and-a-half—wars at the same time. This was defined to mean a war in Europe against the Soviet Union, a war in Asia against China or North Korea, and a "half-war" as well—in other words, a "small" war in the Third World. When Richard Nixon took office in 1969, he altered the formula to state that the United States should be able to fight one-and-a-half wars simultaneously.

This doctrine remained in place until 1989–90, when President George H. W. Bush ordered the "Base Force" study which forecast a substantial cut in the military budget, an end to the Soviet Union's global threat, and the possible beginning of new regional threats. In 1993, President Bill Clinton ordered a "Bottom-Up Review", based on which a strategy called "win-hold-win" was declared—enough forces to win one war while holding off the enemy in another conflict, then moving on to win it after the first war is over. The final draft was changed to read that the United States must be able to win two "major regional conflicts" simultaneously.

The current strategic doctrine, which Defense Secretary Donald Rumsfeld issued in his Quadrennial Defense Review of early 2001 (before the 9/11 attacks), is a package of U.S. military requirements known as 1-4-2-1. The first 1 refers to defending the US homeland. The 4 refers to deterring hostilities in four key regions of the world. The 2 means the US armed forces must have the strength to win swiftly in two near-simultaneous conflicts in those regions. The final 1 means that the US forces must win one of those conflicts "decisively".

The general policy objectives are to (1) assure allies and friends; (2) dissuade future military competition, (3) deter threats and coercion against U.S. interests, and (4) if deterrence fails, decisively defeat any adversary.

==== United States Department of Defense ====
The United States Department of Defense publishes Joint Publications which state all-services doctrine. The current basic doctrinal publication is Joint Publication 3-0, "Doctrine for Joint Operations".

===== United States Air Force =====
Headquarters, United States Air Force, publishes current USAF doctrine. The lead agency for developing Air Force doctrine is the LeMay Center for Doctrine Development and Education; the Air Staff International Standardization Office works on multinational standardization, such as NATO Standardization Agreements (STANAGs), and agreements between the American, British, Canadian, and Australian Armies and Navies (ABCA) that affect the Air Force. Currently the basic Air Force doctrinal documents are the 10-series of Air Force publications.

===== United States Army =====
The United States Army Training and Doctrine Command (TRADOC) is responsible for developing Army doctrine. TRADOC was developed early in the 1970s as a response to the American Army's difficulties in the Vietnam War, and is one of the reforms that improved Army professionalism. Currently the capstone Army doctrinal document is Army Doctrine Publication 3-0, Unified Land Operations (published October 2011).

===== United States Navy =====
The Naval Warfare Development Command (NWDC) Doctrine Department coordinates development, publication, and maintenance of United States Navy doctrine. Currently the basic unclassified naval doctrinal documents are Naval Doctrine Publications 1, 2, 4, 5, and 6. NWDC is also the United States Navy lead for NATO and multinational maritime doctrine and operational standardization.

===== United States Marine Corps =====
The Marine Corps Combat Development Command (MCCDC) has responsibility for United States Marine Corps doctrine. The capstone doctrinal document is Warfighting (MCDP1), along with MCDP's 1-1, 1–2, and 1–3 (Strategy, Campaigning, and Tactics, respectively). MCDP 1-0 (Marine Corps Operations) translates the philosophical-based capstone/keystone publications into operational doctrine.

===== United States Coast Guard =====
Headquarters, United States Coast Guard, published Coast Guard Publication 1, U.S. Coast Guard: America's Maritime Guardian, which is the source of USCG doctrine.

=== SFR Yugoslavia ===
With the passing of the National Defense Law of 1969, Yugoslavia adopted a total war military doctrine named Total National Defense or Total People's Defense^{[b]}. It was inspired by the Yugoslav People's Liberation War against the fascist occupiers and their collaborators in the Second World War, and was designed to allow Yugoslavia to maintain or eventually reestablish its independent and non-aligned status should an invasion occur. According to it, any citizen who resists an aggressor is a member of the armed forces, thus the whole population could be turned into a monolithic resistance army.

Starting from the elementary school education, over high schools, universities, organizations and companies, the authorities prepared the entire population to contest an eventual occupation of the country and finally to liberate it. For this purpose, the Territorial Defense Forces (TO) would be formed to mobilize the population in case of an aggression. The combat readiness of the TO meant that the steps of organization and training could be bypassed after the start of hostilities. The TO would supplement the regular Yugoslav People's Army, giving it greater defensive depth and an armed local population ready to support combat actions. Large numbers of armed civilians would increase the cost of an invasion to a potential aggressor.

The most likely scenario in the doctrine being used was a general war between the NATO and the Warsaw Pact. In such a situation, Yugoslavia would remain non-aligned, and it would not accept foreign troops of either alliance on its territory. The doctrine recognized the likelihood that one side or the other might try to seize Yugoslav territory as a forward staging area, to ensure lines of communication or simply to deny the territory to enemy forces. Such action would be considered aggression and would be resisted. Regardless of ideology, the occupiers would be considered Yugoslavia's enemy.

==== Territorial Defense Forces ====
The Territorial Defense Forces (TO) were formed in 1969 as an integral part of the Yugoslav Total National Defense doctrine. The TO forces consisted of able-bodied civilian males and females. Between 1 and 3 million Yugoslavs between the ages of 15 and 65 would fight under TO command as irregular or guerrilla forces in wartime. In peacetime, however, about 860,000 TO troops were involved in military training and other activities.

The TO concept focused on small, lightly armed infantry units fighting defensive actions on a familiar local terrain. A typical unit was a company-sized detachment. More than 2000 communes, factories, and other enterprises organized such units, which would fight in their home areas, maintaining local defense production essential to the overall war effort. The TO also included some larger, more heavily equipped units with wider operational responsibilities. The TO battalions and regiments operated in regional areas with artillery and antiaircraft guns and some armoured vehicles. Using their mobility and tactical initiative, these units would attempt to alleviate the pressure of enemy armored columns and air strikes on smaller TO units. In the coastal regions, TO units had naval missions. They operated some gunboats in support of navy operations. They were organized to defend strategic coastal areas and naval facilities against enemy amphibious landings and raids. They also trained some divers for use in sabotage and other special operations.

The TO was helped by the fact that most of its citizen-soldiers were one-time JNA conscripts who had completed their term of compulsory military service. However, TO recruitment was somewhat limited by the army's desire to include as many recently released conscripts as possible in its own military reserve. Other sources of TO manpower lacked prior military service and required extensive basic training.

The TO organisation was highly decentralized and independent. TO units were organized and funded by the governments in each of the Yugoslav constituent republics: Bosnia and Herzegovina, Croatia, Macedonia, Montenegro, Serbia and Slovenia.

== See also ==
- Strategy
- Grand strategy
- Naval strategy
- Operational level of war
- Military strategy
- Principles of war
- Military tactics
- Foreign policy doctrine
- Military science
