= Viktor Anfilov =

Russian military member and historian

Viktor Aleksandrovich Anfilov
- Native name: Виктор Александрович Анфилов
- Born: 10 July 1919; Yakubovka, Nizhny Novgorod Governorate, Russian SFSR
- Died: 13 February 2002 (aged 82) Moscow, Russia
- Allegiance: Soviet Union → Russia
Awards
Order of the Patriotic War (1st class)	Order of the Patriotic War (2nd class)	Order of the Patriotic War (2nd class)
Medal "For the Victory over Germany in the Great Patriotic War 1941–1945"

Viktor Aleksandrovich Anfilov (Russian: Ви́ктор Алекса́ндрович Анфи́лов; 10 July 1919 – 13 February 2002) was a Russian military officer and historian. He earned the degree of Doctor of Historical Sciences in 1973, became a professor in 1975 and was awarded the honorary title of Honoured Scientist of the Russian Soviet Federative Socialist Republic in 1990. He rose to the rank of colonel, and saw action on the Eastern Front in World War II.

== Biography ==
Anfilov was born on 10 July 1919 in the village of Yakubovka, Buturlinskaya Volost, Knyagininsky Uyezd, Nizhny Novgorod Governorate. He joined the Red Army in 1939. He studied at the Military Engineering Academy. In June 1941, he underwent training in the Kiev Military District.

Anfilov served during World War II on the Eastern Front. From June 1941, he was the head of a construction group that built airfields on the Southwestern Front. He participated in defensive battles in Ukraine. From December 1942 to May 1945 he was the head of the military-engineering service of the 38th Air Force Base of the 5th Air Army. He fought on the Transcaucasian, North Caucasian, Steppe and 2nd Ukrainian fronts. He participated in the North Caucasian Operation, the Battle of Kursk, the Belgorod–Kharkov offensive operation, the Poltava-Kremenchug operations, the battle for Dnipro, the Kirovograd Offensive, the Battle of Korsun–Cherkassy, the Uman–Botoșani Offensive, the Second Jassy–Kishinev offensive, the Belgrade Offensive, the Battle of Debrecen, the Budapest Offensive, the Vienna Offensive, the Bratislava–Brno offensive and the Prague Offensive. After the capture of enemy airfields, he was worked in mine clearance and preparation for the deployment of Soviet aircraft. He finished the war with the rank of Engineer-Captain.

After the war, Anfilov returned to study at the Military Engineering Academy, and he graduated in 1949. Until the fall of 1951, he served in the Group of Soviet Forces in Germany in engineering and staff positions. In 1953 he graduated from the military-history department of the Frunze Military Academy. Starting in 1957, he served as a teacher at the Military Engineering Academy. In 1955, he defended his PhD thesis.

From 1957 to 1964 Anfilov was a senior researcher in the historical department at t he Military Scientific Directorate of the General Staff. From 1964 to 1970 he was a senior lecturer in the history of wars department at the Military Academy of the General Staff. In September 1970, he retired from the army as a colonel. In October 1970 he started working at the Moscow State Institute of International Relations. He was the head of Evening Preparatory Courses from 1970 to 1975, Dean of the Faculty of International Journalism from 1975 to 1983, head of the Department of History of the USSR from 1983 to 1990, Professor of National History from 1990 to 1997, and Consultant at the Rector's Office from 1997. He earned his Doctor of Historical Sciences in 1973, and professor in 1975. He was the author of several books about the initial period of World War II (from summer - winter of 1941). He was a member of the Union of Journalists of the USSR since 1972.

Anfilov lived in Moscow. He died on 13 February 2002.

== Awards and ranks ==
- Order of the Patriotic War of the first degree (awarded 1 June 1945)
- 2 Orders of the Patriotic War of the second degree (awarded 5 October 1944; 11 March 1985)
- Order of Friendship of Peoples (awarded 10 July 1979)
- 2 Orders of the Red Star (awarded 21 August 1943; 1953)
- Honoured Scientist of the Russian Soviet Federative Socialist Republic (awarded 4 May 1990)

== Books ==
- Анфилов В. А. Начало Великой Отечественной войны - М.: Воениздат, 1962. 224 стр. Тираж: 50000 экз.
- Анфилов В. А. Бессмертный подвиг. Серия: Вторая мировая война в исследованиях, воспоминаниях, документах - М.: Наука, 1971. 543 с. Тираж: 25000 экз
- Анфилов В. А. Провал "Блицкрига" - М.: Наука, 1974. 616 с. Тираж: 50000 экз.
- Анфилов В. А. Незабываемый сорок первый. - М.: Советская Россия, 1982. - 368 с.
- Анфилов В. А. Крушение похода Гитлера на Москву. 1941 - М.: Наука, 1989. 352 с. ISBN 5-02-008498-0, Тираж: 30000 экз.
- Анфилов В. А. Грозное лето 41-го года. - М.: Изд. центр "Анкил-воин", 1995. - 191 с. - (Библиотека российского офицера). - ISBN 5-86476-061-7
- Анфилов В. А. Дорога к трагедии сорок первого года / В. А. Анфилов. – М.: Акопов, 1997. – 304 с. – ISBN 5-900563-06-5.
- Анфилов В. А. Загадка 1941 года. О войне под разными ракурсами. Серия: Военные тайны XX века. М.: Вече, 2005. 512 с. ISBN 5-9533-0287-8 Тираж: 5000 экз.
