= Follow-on Forces Attack =

Follow-on Forces Attack is a NATO doctrine that dates to the early 1980s and brought the Alliance to exploit the microchip revolution. The eight-point programme was proposed by SACEUR General Bernard W. Rogers. It played a key role in NATO's Conceptual Military Framework and in the conventional leg of NATO's triad of deterrent forces.

== Synopsis ==
SACEUR Rogers was troubled by NATO's inadequate conventional military forces when faced with a Warsaw Pact that dominated his on a numeric basis, and ceteris paribus, he would need to resort to the nuclear option. To improve NATO's conventional defence capability, Rogers proposed a novel idea he labelled the "Follow-on Forces Attack" (FOFA) Concept, which theorized to counter a Warsaw Pact invasion by making deep conventional attacks on the enemy's second and third echelon forces to prevent them from reaching NATO's defensive positions.

FOFA was adopted by NATO in November 1984. The defects which were identified for remedy were:

- Lack of suitable ground-launched missiles
- Inability to operate aircraft at night and in bad weather
- Inability to acquire and target moving vehicles at night and through clouds
- Inability to dynamically identify and target armored vehicles moving in and out of urban or other areas (reacquiring lost target tracks)
- Lack of effective integration of corps, division, and battalion capabilities to support maneuver forces across division control lines
- Defeating enemy air defenses, including shoulder-fired missiles
- Ever-increasing demands to increase the depth of sensors, targeting, and deep strike systems
- Requirements for unmanned aerial vehicles

Rogers saw the technological basis for change lying in the microchip, which created new possibilities for high-speed, real-time data processing, as well as in micro-electronic sensor technology, notable for important applications in reconnaissance and target acquisition.

Operationally, the FOFA concept was simply to interdict Soviet follow-on-forces located 24, 48, and 72 hours removed from NATO defensive positions. The problem was: to coordinate deep battle and air interdiction efforts out to 150 kilometers behind the line of contact, or roughly 72 hours away from it; and to plan for airborne deep strike missions 300 kilometers into the enemy's rear; and developing technology and doctrine to enable commanders quickly to adapt air strikes and fire missions. FOFA was the first "systems-of-systems" architecture. As of 2015 nearly 100 FOFA systems were integrated into the mix available to battle commanders.
