= Yakubovka =

Yakubovka Якубовка
- Selo
- Location of Yakubovka
- Location of Yakubovka Yakubovka (Russia)
- Coordinates: 56°01′59″N 39°03′08″E
- Country: Russia
- Federal subject: Nizhny Novgorod Oblast
- Administrative district: Buturlinsky District

Population (2010 Census)
  - Total: 384
- Time zone: UTC+3 (MSK)
- Postal code(s): 607433
- OKTMO ID: 22612432101

Yakubovka (Russian: Якубовка) is a rural locality (a selo) in Buturlinsky District in Nizhny Novgorod Oblast. Population: 384 inhabitants (2010). The distance to the town Buturlino is about 30 km.
