= Edward C. Meyer =

United States Army general (1928–2020)

Edward Charles Meyer
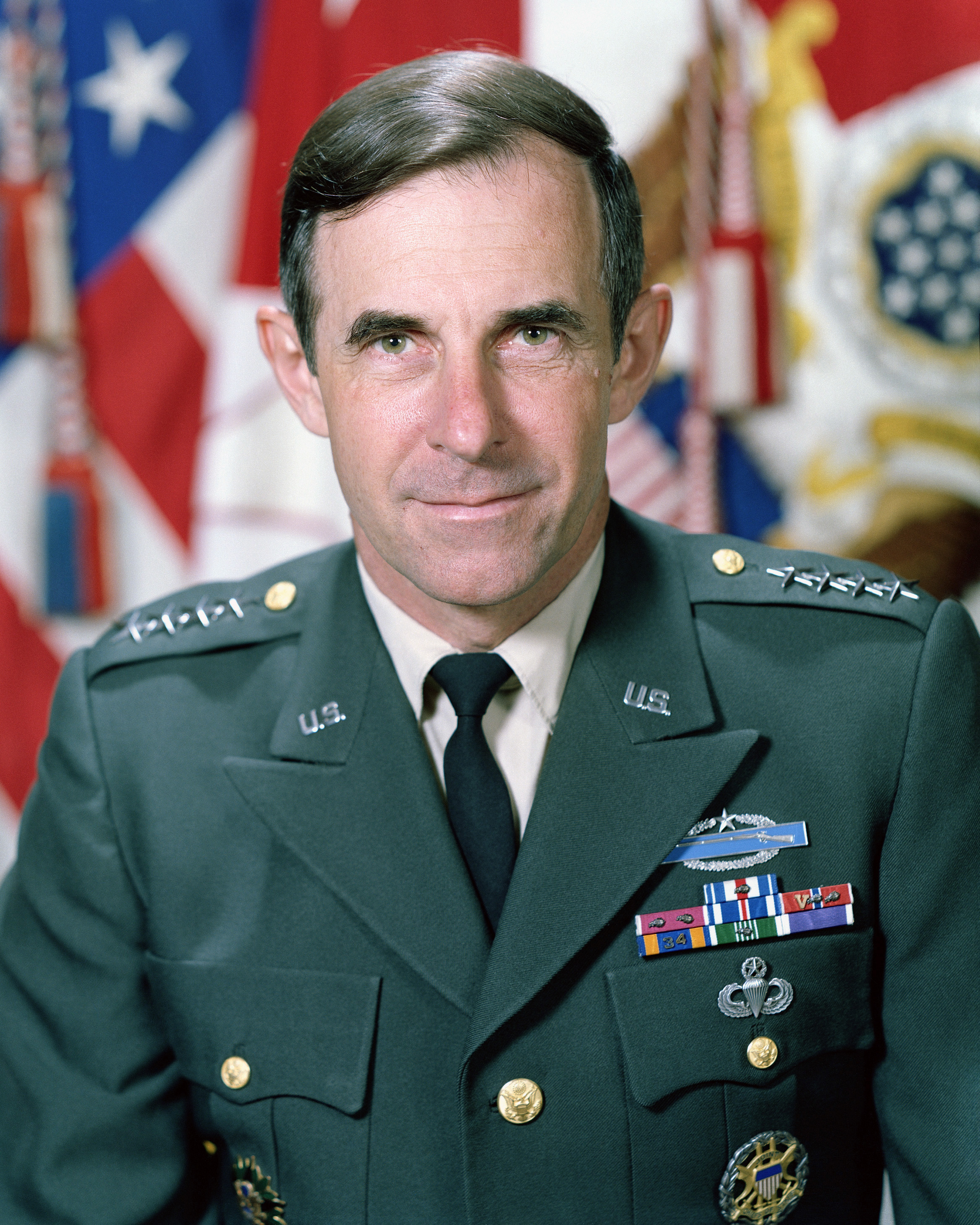
- General Edward C. Meyer in 1983
- Born: 11 December 1928; St. Marys, Pennsylvania, U.S.
- Died: 13 October 2020 (aged 91); Arlington County, Virginia, U.S.
- Military career
- Allegiance: United States
- Branch: United States Army
- Service years: 1951–1983
- Rank: General
- Nickname: Shy
- Commands: Chief of Staff of the United States Army; 3rd Infantry Division; 2nd Brigade, 1st Cavalry Division; 2nd Battalion, 5th Cavalry Regiment
- Conflicts: Korean War; Vietnam War
- Awards: Defense Distinguished Service Medal; Silver Star (2); Legion of Merit (3); Distinguished Flying Cross; Bronze Star Medal (3)

Edward Charles "Shy" Meyer (11 December 1928 – 13 October 2020) was a United States Army general who served as the 29th Chief of Staff of the United States Army.

== Early life ==
Meyer was born in St. Marys, Pennsylvania, on 11 December 1928. Upon graduation from the United States Military Academy in 1951 he was commissioned a second lieutenant and attended the U.S. Army Infantry School at Fort Benning.

== Military career ==
Meyer's first assignment was as a platoon leader in Company C, 25th Armored Infantry Battalion in the Korean War from 1951 to 1952. After promotion to first lieutenant in July 1952 he served as a platoon leader, company commander, and battalion staff officer with the 2nd Battalion, 24th Infantry Regiment, also in Korea, until 1953. He next served in the 1st Officer Candidate Regiment, Infantry School from 1953 to 1954, afterwards serving as aide to the assistant commandant of the Infantry School, and then as an instructor in operations until 1957. During his time there he was promoted to temporary captain, in July 1956. He next graduated from the infantry officers advanced and basic airborne courses in 1957, continuing on to command Headquarters and Headquarters Company, 1st Airborne Battle Group, 501st Infantry, from 1957 to 1958. He was promoted to permanent captain in February, 1958 and command of the battle group's Company D from 1958 to 1959. After company command he attended the Command and General Staff College at Fort Leavenworth, graduating in 1960, and being promoted to temporary major in October of that year. He was next manpower control officer in the Office of the Assistant Chief of Staff, G–1, United States Army, Europe (Rear) from 1960 to 1961, and assistant executive and aide to the chief of staff at Supreme Headquarters, Allied Powers Europe from 1961 to 1963. He graduated from the Armed Forces Staff College in 1964, receiving a promotion to temporary lieutenant colonel in May 1964 and permanent major in June 1965. After graduation he served in the Coordination Division of the Office of the Chief of Staff until 1965.

=== Vietnam War ===
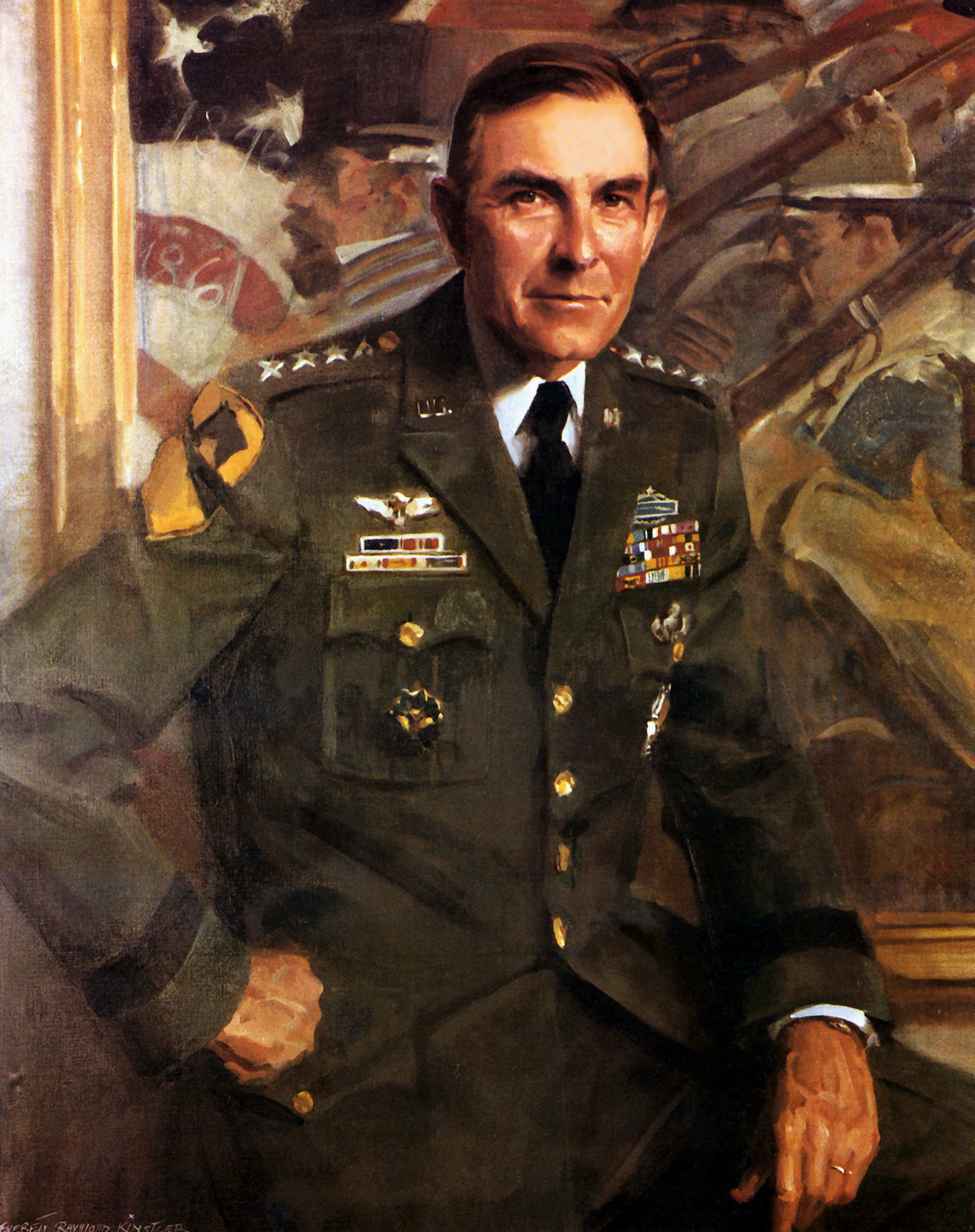
Portrait of General Edward C. Meyer

Again Meyer returned to combat as deputy commander of the 3rd Brigade, 1st Cavalry Division (Airmobile) in Vietnam, later taking command of the 2nd Battalion, 5th Cavalry from 1965 to 1966. Returning stateside, he graduated from the National War College in 1967, then served in the Plans and Operations Division, Office of the Joint Chiefs of Staff until 1969, promoted to temporary colonel in November 1968. He returned to Vietnam to command the 2nd Brigade, 1st Cavalry Division (Airmobile), and then served as division chief of staff, leaving Vietnam in 1970.

=== Post-war ===
Meyer was chosen as a federal executive fellow at the Brookings Institution from 1970 to 1971. He was promoted to temporary brigadier general in August 1971 and permanent lieutenant colonel in June 1972. After promotion to flag rank he served as assistant division commander (support) of the 82nd Airborne Division from 1971 to 1972, followed by assignment as deputy commandant of the Army War College from 1972 to 1973. He was next deputy chief of staff for operations, United States Army, Europe, and Seventh Army until 1974, being promoted to temporary major general in August 1973. He was chosen as commanding general of the 3rd Infantry Division, United States Army, Europe from 1974 to 1975.

=== Senior commands and Chief of Staff ===
He moved to the Pentagon in 1975 as assistant deputy chief and deputy chief of staff for operations and plans, United States Army, and remained in that position until 1979. He was promoted to permanent colonel in March 1976, and temporary lieutenant general in October 1976.

Meyer was promoted to the rank of general in June 1979, whereupon he was selected as Chief of Staff of the United States Army, a post he filled from 22 June 1979 to 31 June 1983. During his tenure he prosecuted an Army-wide modernization program with emphasis on quality over quantity, stressed the need for a long-term investment in land force materiel, and launched a unit-manning system to reduce personnel turbulence and to enhance readiness. Meyer was responsible for many improvements which transformed the US Army from having poor morale and discipline in the 1970s to a far more professional and capable force in the 1980s. Meyer retired from active service in June 1983.

== Personal life ==
Meyer married Carol McCunniff in 1954. Together they had five children; three sons, Tom, Tim, and Doug; and two daughters, Nancy and Stuart. His daughter, Nancy, is an actress who is married to Michael Cartellone, the drummer for the band Lynyrd Skynyrd. His son, Tom, is a political cartoonist who is married to Gretchen Nash and has a daughter named Mia. Tim is married to Lindsay with three children named Thomas, Christy, and Lauren. His son Doug is married to Barbara with two children named Caroline and Ethan. His daughter Stuart has a son named Josh Konz. Konz is married to Becky Keenan, and together they have Meyer's great-grandson, named Kieran.

Meyer died from pneumonia on 13 October 2020, in Arlington, Virginia, at the age of 91.

== Promotion dates ==
Rank	Temporary	Permanent
2nd lieutenant	–	June 1951
First lieutenant	–	July 1952
Captain	July 1956	February 1958
Major	October 1960	June 1965
Lieutenant colonel	May 1964	June 1972
Colonel	November 1968	March 1976
Brigadier general	August 1971	?
Major general	August 1973	?
Lieutenant general	October 1976	?
General	?	June 1979

== Awards and decorations ==

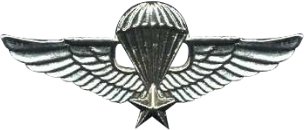

Combat Infantryman Badge w/ Star
Defense Distinguished Service Medal
Silver Star w/ Oak Leaf Cluster	Legion of Merit w/ 2 Oak Leaf Clusters	Distinguished Flying Cross
Bronze Star w/ V device and 2 Oak Leaf Clusters	Air Medal w/ numeral 34	Army Commendation Medal w/ Oak Leaf Cluster
Purple Heart	National Defense Service Medal with one service star	Korean Service Medal with three bronze service stars
Vietnam Service Medal with one silver service star and two bronze service stars	Unidentified	Vietnam Distinguished Service Order Army, 2nd Class
Gallantry Cross (Vietnam) with bronze palm	United Nations Medal for Korea	Vietnam Campaign Medal
Army Presidential Unit Citation with one oak leaf cluster	Unidentified	Valorous Unit Award
Korea Presidential Unit Citation	Gallantry Cross (Vietnam) Unit Citation	Vietnam Civil Actions Medal Unit Citation
Vietnam Parachutist Badge		Master Parachtist Badge
Army Staff Identification Badge Worn on right breast pocket		Office of the Joint Chiefs of Staff Identification Badge Worn on left breast pocket
1st Cavalry Division Combat Service Identification Badge

Military offices
Preceded by Bernard W. Rogers	Chief of Staff of the United States Army; 1979–1983	Succeeded by John A. Wickham Jr.
