= Graphic training aids =

Graphic training aids (GTAs) are publications that assist during the conduct of training and the process of learning.

Current Training Aids come in different forms, including models, displays, slides, books, pictures and media presentations.

During World War II, Graphic Training Aids were in high demand. Large quantities of young men were recruited which demanded a higher rate of training. A large replica of an M1 Garand rifle would be presented in front of a class. During his presentation, the trainer would use it as a reference. Printed media was also used in the form of exploded view drawings, which depicted various parts of rifles.

A curious form of a Graphic Training Aid was used during the Vietnam War, in the form of a comic book. The Graphic Training Aid, called M16A1 Operation and Preventive Maintenance, explained the proper maintenance of an M16 rifle and was highly effective since it was targeted at the young infantry men and illustrated by the popular comic book artist, Will Eisner.

United States Army Graphic Training Aids, Field Manuals and other training media are produced by organizations such as the United States Army Training and Doctrine Command (TRADOC), the Army Training Support Center (ATSC), G3 and the Training Aids Service Center (TASC).

Other forms of Graphic Training Aids exist as well. The vast majority of Training Aids exist for non-military training such as safety training and work training. Such guides are produced by the U.S. Department of Labor Occupational Safety and Health Administration.

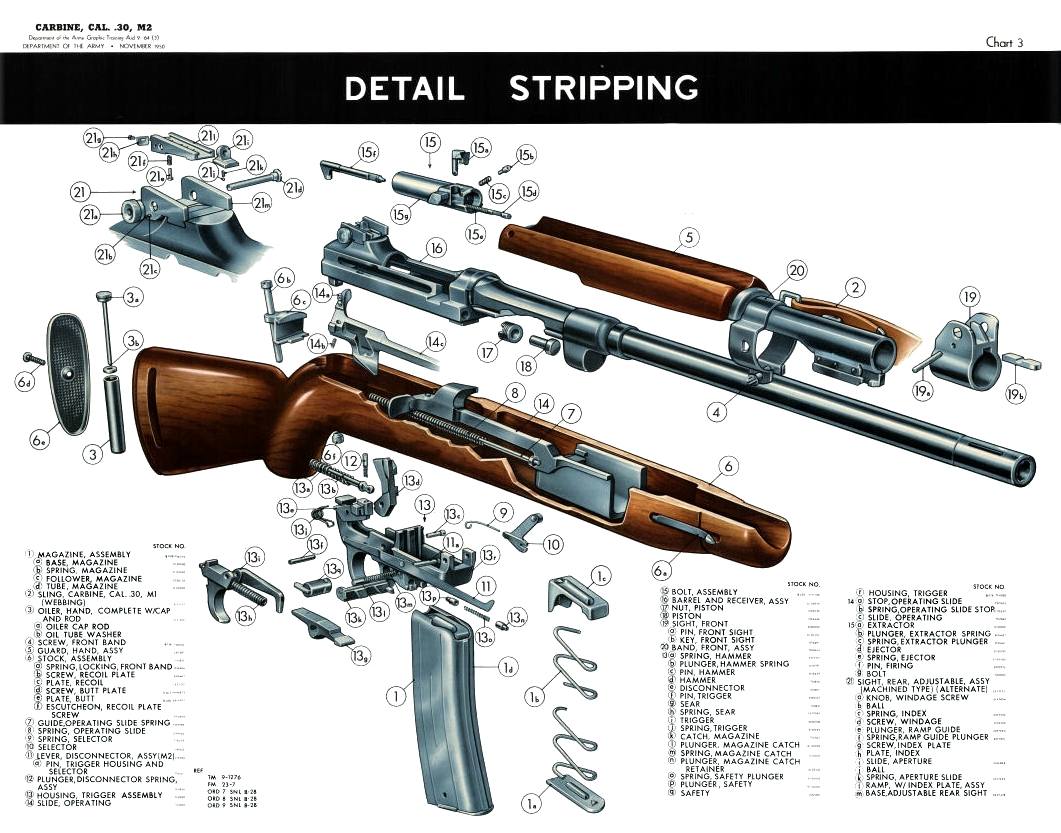
Exploded view drawing of an M2 Carbine

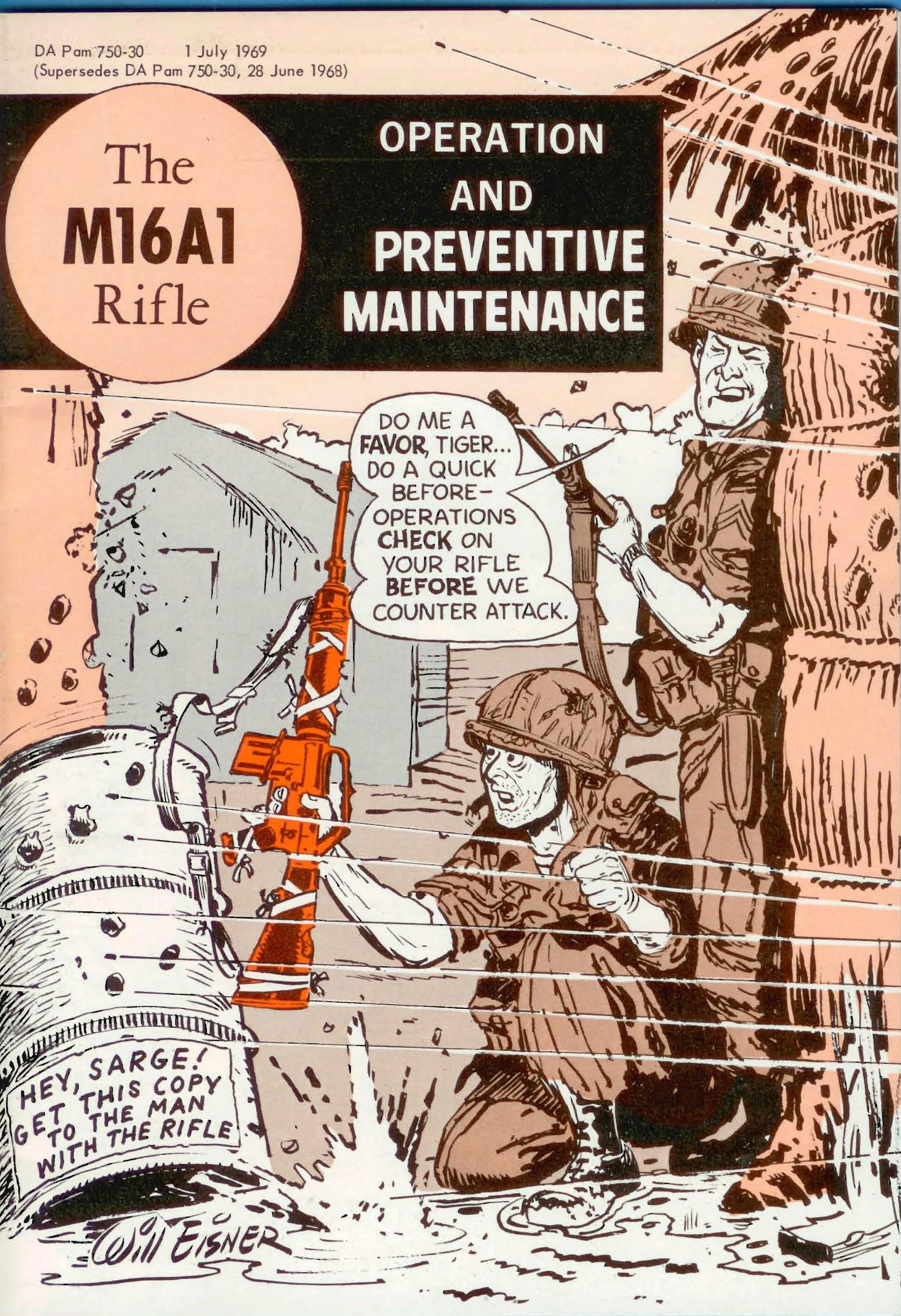
Comic book manual M16A1 Operation and Preventive Maintenance

== See also ==
- List of established military terms
- U.S. Army Field Manuals
- Tigerfibel
