= William E. DePuy =

United States Army general

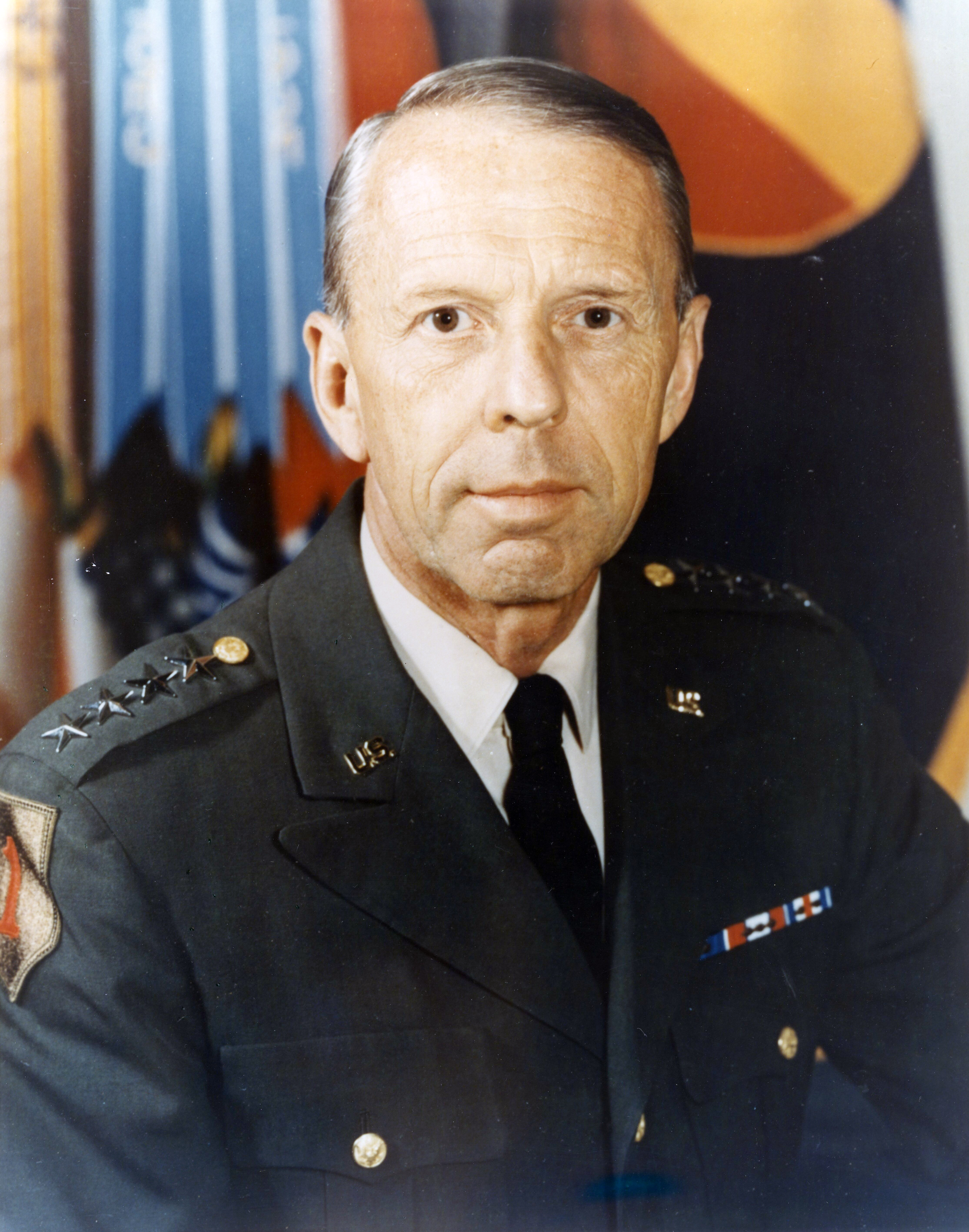
- General William E. DePuy
- Born: 1 October 1919; Jamestown, North Dakota, U.S.
- Died: 9 September 1992 (aged 72); Arlington, Virginia, U.S.
- Burial place: Brown Family Cemetery; Albemarle County, Virginia
- Military career
- Allegiance: United States
- Branch: United States Army
- Service years: 1941–1977
- Rank: General
- Service number: 0-34710
- Commands: United States Army Training and Doctrine Command; 1st Infantry Division; 2d Battalion, 8th Infantry Regiment
- Conflicts: World War II; Vietnam War
- Awards: Distinguished Service Cross (2); Army Distinguished Service Medal (5); Air Force Distinguished Service Medal; Silver Star (3); Legion of Merit; Distinguished Flying Cross; Bronze Star Medal; Purple Heart (2)

William Eugene DePuy (1 October 1919 – 9 September 1992) was a United States Army general and the first commander of the United States Army Training and Doctrine Command. He is widely regarded as one of the principal architects of the restructuring of United States Army doctrine after the American withdrawal from Vietnam.

== Early life and World War II ==
DePuy was born in Jamestown, North Dakota. He was of French Huguenot and Scotch-Irish descent via Canada. His military career began when he enlisted in the South Dakota National Guard, eventually becoming a squad leader. He graduated from South Dakota State University in 1941 with a Bachelor of Science in economics, and received a Reserve Officers' Training Corps commission as a second lieutenant of Infantry. His first assignment was with the 20th Infantry Regiment at Fort Leonard Wood, and during this time he walked to the Louisiana Maneuvers and back with his platoon.

Shortly after the United States' entry into World War II, DePuy was assigned in 1942 as a lieutenant, at age 22, to the newly formed 90th Infantry Division. He received a field promotion to major in command of a battalion during the Normandy campaign in August 1944, at age 24. He served with the 90th Division in the fierce fighting from Utah Beach through the Battle of the Bulge. For his combat heroism he was awarded his first Distinguished Service Cross and three Silver Stars. He then served as an operations officer at division level and was promoted to lieutenant colonel in January 1945.

DePuy's service as battalion commander, regimental executive officer and division's operations officer was described as outstanding by 90th Division late commander, Major General Herbert L. Earnest. General James A. Van Fleet called DePuy's staff work as "brilliant" and added that his "inspiring and courageous leadership" of his battalion provided "some of the finest examples of infantry operations in this War".

He would later reflect that "the Division learned to fight for real against the Germans in Normandy--the Germans did the instructing.. in six weeks the 90th Division lost 100% of its strength in infantry soldiers and 150% of its officers."

== Interbellum ==
Following World War II, DePuy attended the United States Army Command and General Staff College. After graduation, he served in myriad command and staff positions, including command of the 2d Battalion, 8th Infantry, 4th Infantry Division, and the 1st Battle Group, 30th Infantry, 3d Infantry Division, both in the Federal Republic of Germany. In 1948 he attended the Defense Language Institute for a year to learn Russian, followed in 1949 by assignment as Assistant Military Attaché, and later the acting Army Attaché in Budapest, Hungary. During the Korean War, DePuy spent time convalescing after a broken leg, and then performed clandestine service for the Central Intelligence Agency in China and other Asian countries. In 1953, DePuy began attendance at the Armed Forces Staff College, followed by assignment to the Office of the Chief of Staff of the United States Army, where he worked on modernization of Army force structure, doctrine and training policies. In 1960, DePuy was a student at the Royal College of Defence Studies.

DePuy met Marjory Kennedy Walker of Salem, Virginia, a Far East specialist who served with both the Office of Strategic Services and the Central Intelligence Agency, and they were married in June 1951. A son, William E DePuy Jr. was born in July 1952, and daughters Joslin and Daphne in July 1953 and 1954, respectively.

== Vietnam War ==
First deployed to Vietnam in 1964, DePuy served as Chief of Staff of Operations for Military Assistance Command, Vietnam, and in March 1966 he assumed command of the 1st Infantry Division ("the Big Red One"). During his time as commander, he established a scholarship fund for the children of 1st Infantry Division soldiers killed in Vietnam, which eventually became the 1st Infantry Division Foundation. Also during his time as commander, he became known as having an "ax-swinging" style of officer management; having fired as many as 56 officers under him, including seven battalion commanders and many more majors, captains and sergeants major. This led Army chief of staff General Harold K. Johnson to say, "If every division commander relieved people like DePuy, I'd soon be out of lieutenant colonels and majors. He just eats them up like peanuts." DePuy later explained to an interviewer that his experience in World War II had informed him of the importance of good leadership in war as he had "fought in Normandy with three battalion commanders who should have been relieved in peacetime." He firmly believed that command was a privilege to be earned, not a right.

== Post-Vietnam activities ==
DePuy is perhaps best remembered for his efforts while he was the first commander of the United States Army Training and Doctrine Command from 1973 to 1977. DePuy outlined his strategic worldview in a June 1973 speech at Fort Polk, Louisiana, in which he claimed that a war in Europe against the Soviet Union would need to be fought quickly and decisively with a qualitatively superior army to negate the Soviets' advantage in manpower. In another speech that year, he emphasized the need for realistic training in highly maneuverable combined arms formations with tanks playing a leading role on the battlefield. DePuy initially developed these views from his World War II experience against a German Army trained in blitzkrieg, and his review of Israeli fighting during the 1973 Yom Kippur War reconfirmed his beliefs.

DePuy supervised the Army's effort to learn lessons from the Yom Kippur War, and one of the lessons learned was that "in clashes of massed armor… both sides sustained devastating losses, approaching 50% in less than two weeks of combat. ... these statistics are of serious import for US Army commanders." This period of study resulted in TRADOC's first publication, a 1976 revision of the Army's FM 100-5 Operations, which promoted an attrition-based doctrine called "Active Defense". Its effect was:

- to attempt defense of the FRG in a series of retrograde battles
- Army maneuver doctrine required a complete revision
- The previous mobilization programs would not be useful
- Training proficiency must be far higher
- Training itself must be far more realistic

In theory Active Defense was supposed to compensate for:

- a 1:2 numerical disadvantage
- the relatively poor quality equipment
- the unwillingness of NATO to use WMD

The 1976 version of Operations was the first in the series to incorporate force ratios as a decision-making tool. The manual heavily emphasized the favorability of defending with a ratio of 3:1, mentioning it in five varying forms of application at both the tactical and the operational levels of war, similar to the argument advanced in Lanchester's Laws. The Active Defense doctrine assumed the enemy would adhere to a doctrine of a massed penetration at a single point.

DePuy had noticed over the course of his career that the officer corps of the Army lacked intellectual rigor. One of his signal achievements was to raise the level of his graduates and his recruits, so that the Army now could solve complicated problems because it had intelligent people. Then once the core group had their solution, they would "ram it down the Army's throat." The 1976 version of Operations approached warfare in a "scientific" manner, for which it received abundant criticism. The manual alarmed traditionalists with its abundant use of graphs and charts, associated with operations research analysts, aimed at illustrating the lethality of the battlefield. Many military professionals associated the manual and its quantitative approach with Secretary of Defense Robert McNamara's quantitative management of Vietnam, which they blamed for losing the war.

DePuy's doctrine did not survive contact with war games and so his successor, Donn A. Starry, was left rethink a new one.

DePuy retired from active duty in July 1977, and settled in Highfield, Virginia. He died on 9 September 1992, of Creutzfeldt–Jakob disease, and his wife died on 15 March 2002.

== Decorations ==
DePuy's awards included two Distinguished Service Crosses, five Army Distinguished Service Medals, the Air Force Distinguished Service Medal, three Silver Stars, the Legion of Merit, the Distinguished Flying Cross, the Bronze Star Medal, two Purple Hearts, and Air Medal with "V" device. His foreign decorations include the Commander of the French Legion of Honor, the Knight's Cross of the German Order of Merit, the Vietnam Cross of Gallantry, and the Republic of Korea Order of National Security Merit First Class.

Badges

Combat Infantryman Badge
Basic Army Aviator Badge

Decorations

Distinguished Service Cross with bronze oak leaf cluster
Army Distinguished Service Medal with four bronze oak leaf clusters
Air Force Distinguished Service Medal
Silver Star with two bronze oak leaf clusters
Legion of Merit
Distinguished Flying Cross
Bronze Star Medal
Purple Heart with bronze oak leaf cluster
Air Medal with V device

Unit Award

Army Meritorious Unit Commendation with bronze oak leaf cluster

Service Medals

American Defense Service Medal
American Campaign Medal
European-African-Middle Eastern Campaign Medal with Arrowhead device and three bronze campaign stars
World War II Victory Medal
Army of Occupation Medal
National Defense Service Medal with service star
Armed Forces Expeditionary Medal
Vietnam Service Medal with silver and bronze campaign stars

Foreign Awards

Legion of Honour (Commander)
National Order of Vietnam (Knight)
Vietnam Gallantry Cross with Palm
Order of Merit of the Federal Republic of Germany, Knight Commander's Cross
Badge of Honour of the Bundeswehr (Gold)
South Korean Order of National Security Merit (First Class)
Republic of Vietnam Gallantry Cross Unit Citation
Republic of Vietnam Civil Actions Medal Unit Citation
Vietnam Campaign Medal

Military offices
New command	Commanding General, United States Army Training and Doctrine Command; 1973–1977	Succeeded by Donn A. Starry
