= Shattuck =

Shattuck is an archaic word for grapefruit, however the name, Shattuck, predates grapefruit, as until 1814, grapefruits were named shaddocks, after Captain Shaddock. It can also refer to:

== People ==
- Aaron Draper Shattuck, American painter
- Ben Shattuck, American writer
- Braden Shattuck, American golfer
- Corinna Shattuck, American missionary
- Dwayne Shattuck, television producer
- Erasmus Darwin Shattuck (1824–1900), American politician
- Francis Kittredge Shattuck (1824–1898), American politician
- Henry Lee Shattuck, politician
- Jessica Shattuck, author
- Job Shattuck, rebel
- John Shattuck, American educator
- Kim Shattuck (1963–2019), American singer
- Lemuel Shattuck (1793–1859), Boston politician, historian, bookseller and publisher
- Lillian Shattuck, violinist
- Lydia White Shattuck (1822–1889), American botanist
- Mayo A. Shattuck III, businessman
- Molly Shattuck, socialite
- Paul Shattuck, American autism researcher
- Roger Shattuck (1923–2005), American writer
- Samuel Walker Shattuck (1841–1913), American mathematician
- Shari Shattuck, American actress, writer
- Truly Shattuck musical actress

== Places ==
- Shattuck, Oklahoma
- Shattuck Avenue, a street in Berkeley, California
- Shattuckville, an area in Colrain, Massachusetts

== Things ==
- Shattuck-Saint Mary's
- Shattuck House
- Franklyn C. Shattuck House
- Shattuck Observatory, an early observatory at Dartmouth College, Hanover, New Hampshire, US

== See also ==
- Shattock sometimes an alternative spelling
