= List of University of Maryland, Baltimore County honorary degree recipients =

This List of University of Maryland, Baltimore County Honorary Degree Recipients includes those persons who have been recognized by UMBC for outstanding achievements in their fields that reflect the ideals and uphold the purposes of the university, and to whom the university faculty has voted to award honorary degrees in recognition of such attainments. Many of the individuals below are also speakers during the university's commencement ceremonies.

The following are recipients of honorary degrees from the University of Maryland, Baltimore County, beginning in 1970:

== Honorary degree recipients, 1970–1979 ==
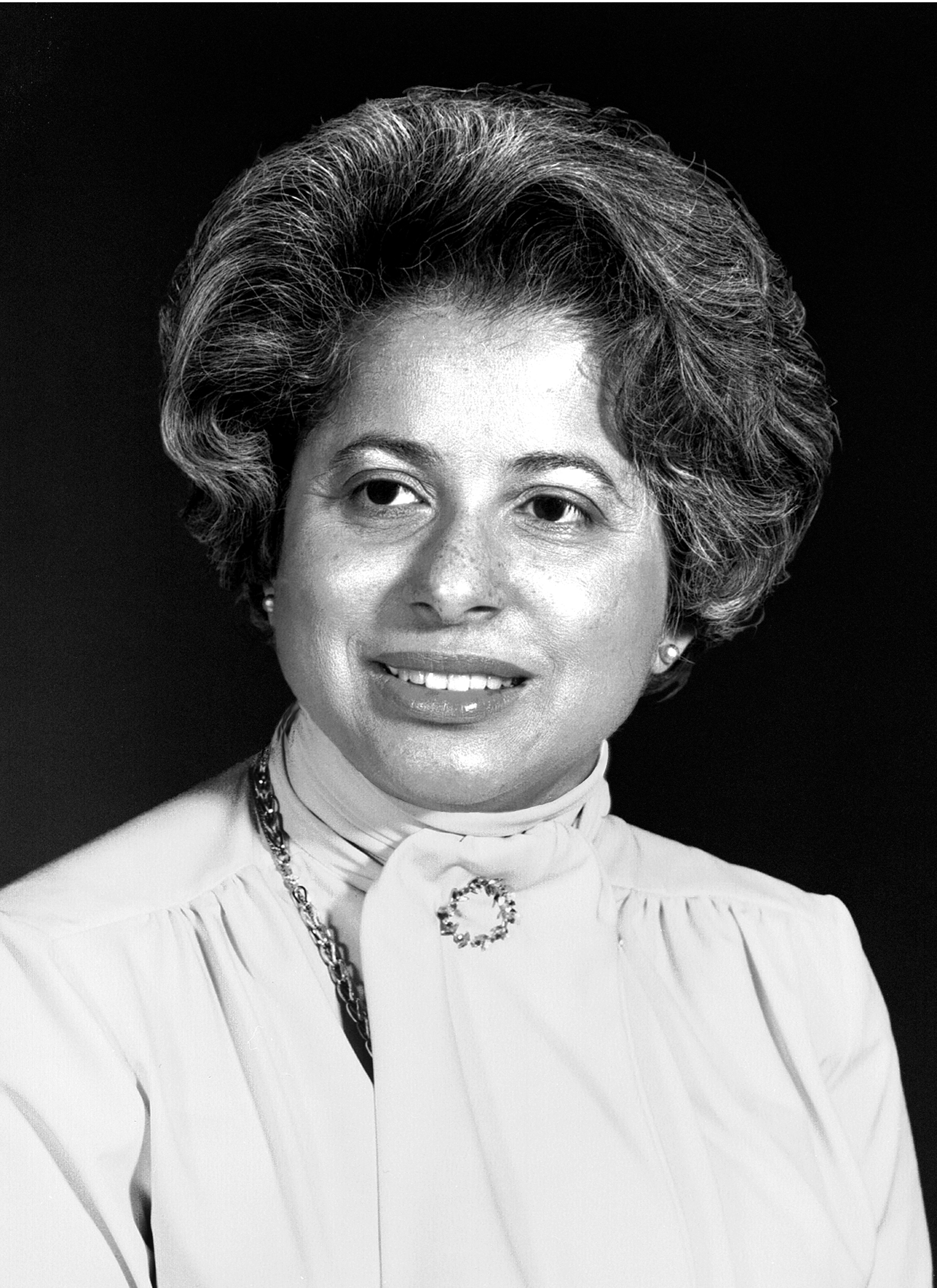
Patricia Roberts Harris, the first African American woman to serve on the United States cabinet, was honored with a degree in 1974.

1970

- Howard K. Smith, Humane Letters

1971

- Patricia Roberts Harris, Laws

1972

- King V. Cheek, Laws

1973

- B.F. Skinner, Humane Letters

1974

- Malcolm Charles Moos, Laws

1975

- Alice Rivlin, Laws

1976

- James S. Ackerman, Humane Letters

1977

- Louis Kaplan, Letters
- Richard Lattimore, Humane Letters
- Albert Sabin, Science

1978

- John Barademas, Laws
- Halden Keffer Hartline, Science
- Ola Belle Reed, Humane Letters

1979

- Peter Gay, Letters
- C.L.R. James, Humane Letters

== Honorary degree recipients, 1980–1989 ==
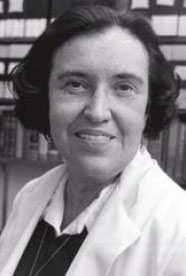
Rosalyn Sussman Yalow was awarded an honorary degree in 1982 for being the first American woman to co-win a Nobel Prize in Physiology or Medicine in 1977.

1980

- Ernst Boyer, Public Service
- Lucille Clifton, Humane Letters
- Donald Henderson, Science

1981

- Sterling A. Brown, Humanities
- Jon Franklin, Humane Letters

1982

- Tom L. Freudenheim, Fine Arts
- John M. Sheehan, Public Service
- Maxim Shostakovich, Fine Arts
- Rosalyn Sussman Yalow, Science

1983

- Donald D. Brown, Science
- John L. Crew, Sr., Public Service
- Lotte Jacobi, Fine Arts
- Albin Owings Kuhn, Public Service
- William Arthur Lewis, Laws

1984

- Robert Duncan, Fine Arts
- Stephan Jay Gould, Science
- Raymond V. Haysbert, Public Service
- Roger Rosenblatt, Humane Letters

1985

- Robert M. Ball, Public Administration
- Dorothy Hill, Humanities
- Alice Gwathney Pinderhughes, Public Service
- Maxine Singer, Science
- Chia Chen Tan, Science

1986

- John G. St.Clair Drake, Letters
- Reg Murphy, Public Service
- Pauline Oliveros, Music
- Rudolph G. Penner, Public Service
- James P. Grant, Public Service
- Walter Rosenblum, Fine Arts

1987

- LaSalle D. Leffall, Jr., Science
- Charles McC, Mathias, Jr., Science

1988

- Lyn P. Meyerhoff, Fine Arts
- Benjamin Arthur Quarles, Humane Letters
- Walter Sondheim, Jr., Public Service
- Hiltgunt Zassenhaus, Humane Letters

1989

- Paul Duke, Laws
- Frances Morton Froelicher, Public Services
- Kou-ting Li, Science
- Max Roach, Music

== Honorary degree recipients, 1990–1999 ==
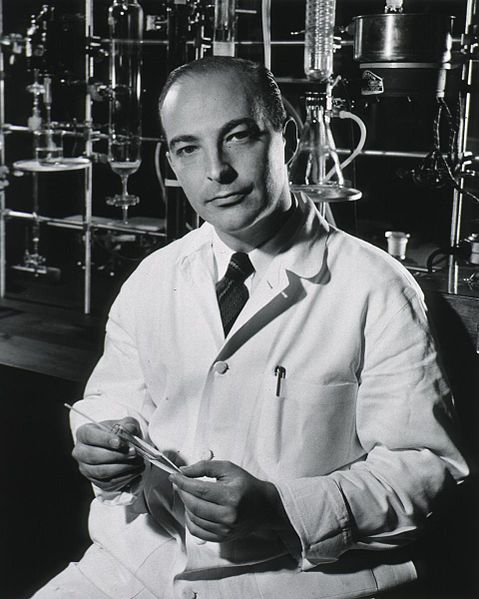
In 1991, an honorary degree in science was awarded to the Nobel Prize-winning biochemist, Arthur Kornberg.

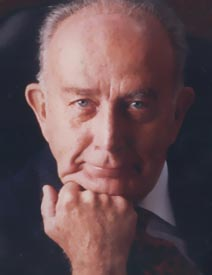
William Donald Schaefer, Governor of Maryland and Mayor of Baltimore, was chosen as a recipient in 1994.

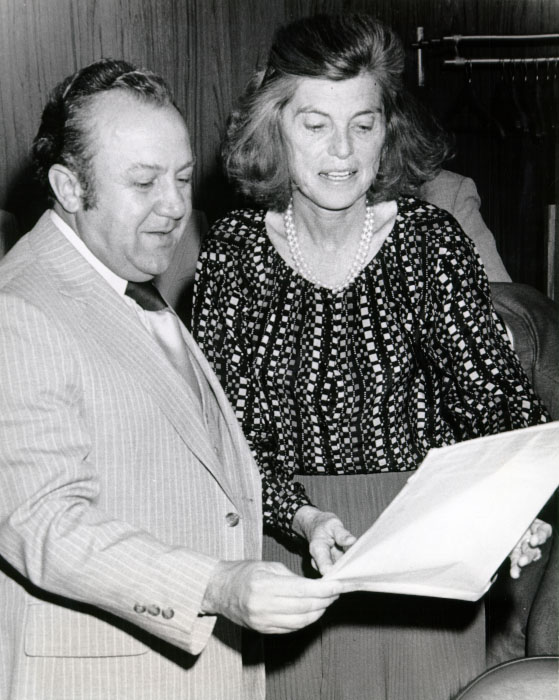
Eunice Kennedy Shriver (on right), philanthropist and children's health and disabilities advocate, received an honorary degree in 1999 along with her husband, Sargent Shriver. The couple also founded The Shriver Center on the UMBC campus.

1990

- Taylor Branch, Humane Letters
- Eli Jacobs, Humane Letters
- Gwendolyn King, Public Service

1991

- Robert Coles, Humane Letters
- Ralph Gibson, Fine Arts
- Arthur Kornberg, Science
- Enolia McMillan, Public Service

1992

- Henry Cisneros, Public Service
- Nancy Graves, Fine Arts
- Emmett Paige, Jr., Laws

1993

- R. Charles Avara, Public Service
- Perter Lax, Science
- Robert E. Meyerhoff, Humane Letters
- Barbara Mikulski, Letters

1994

- Shirley Chater, Humane Letters
- Louis Goldstein, Humane Letters
- William Hackerman, Engineering
- William C. Richardson, Humane Letters
- Nelson John Sabatini, Public Service
- William Donald Schaefer, Laws
- Lisbeth Bamberger Schoor, Humane Letters
- Carole Simpson, Humane Letters
- Harold Wolff, Laws

1995

- Edward Ray McCracken, Science
- Otto Piene, Fine Arts
- Harold Eliot Varmus, Science

1996

- Stephen M. Case, Science
- Purnell W. Choppin, Science
- J. Robert Kerrey, Public Service

1997

- Carl Djerassi, Science
- John H. Gibbons, Science
- Ira Magaziner, Public Administration
- Donna Shalala, Public Service

1998

- Daniel Saul Goldin, Science

1999

- Rita Rossi Colwell, Science
- John C. Erickson, Public Service
- Nancy Erickson, Public Service
- Darielle Dunn Lineman, Arts
- Earl Louise Linehan, Arts
- Eunice Kennedy Shriver, Public Service
- Sargent Shriver, Public Service

== Honorary degree recipients, 2000–2009 ==
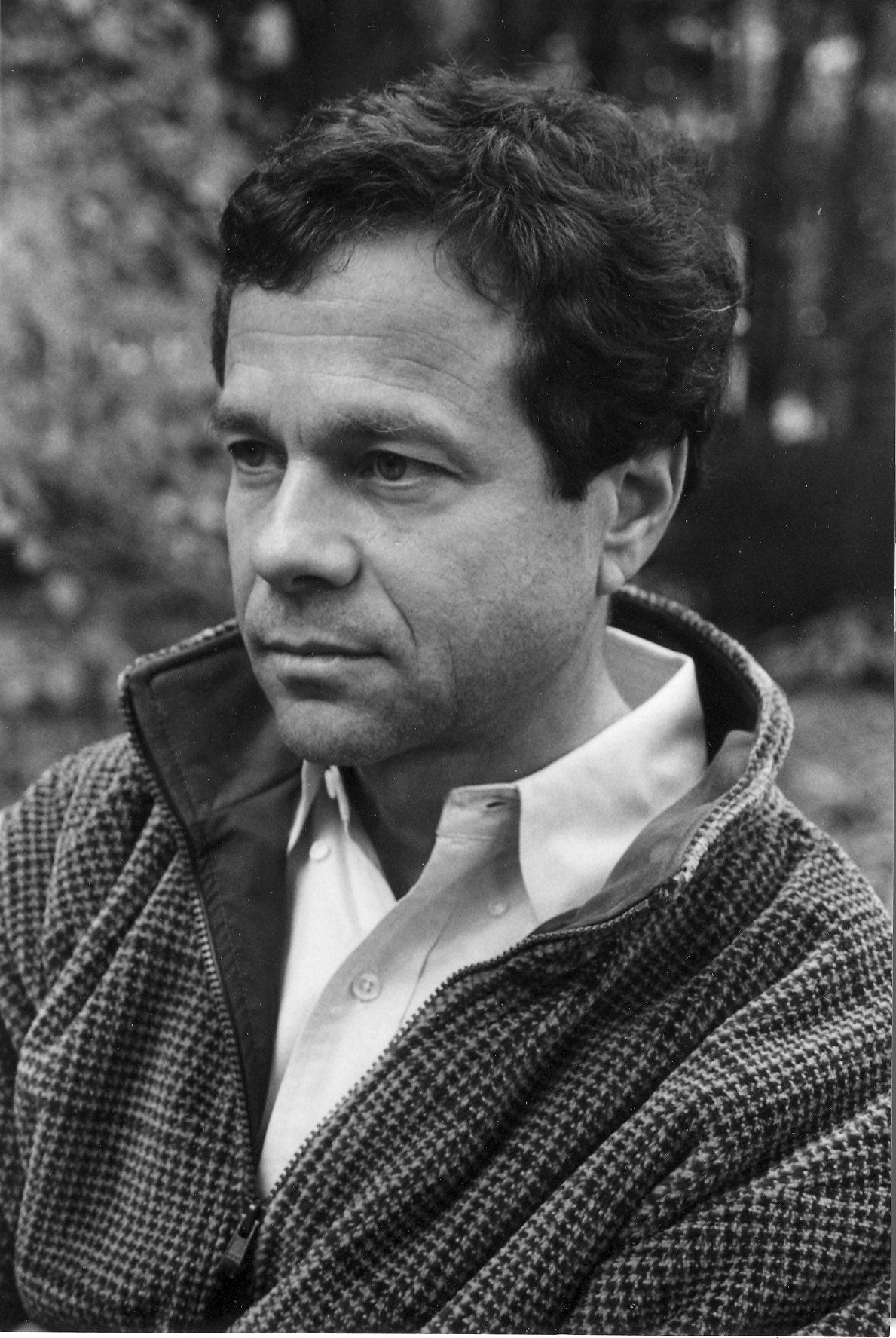
Physicist, writer, and social entrepreneur, Alan Lightman was given a degree in Humanities in 2006.

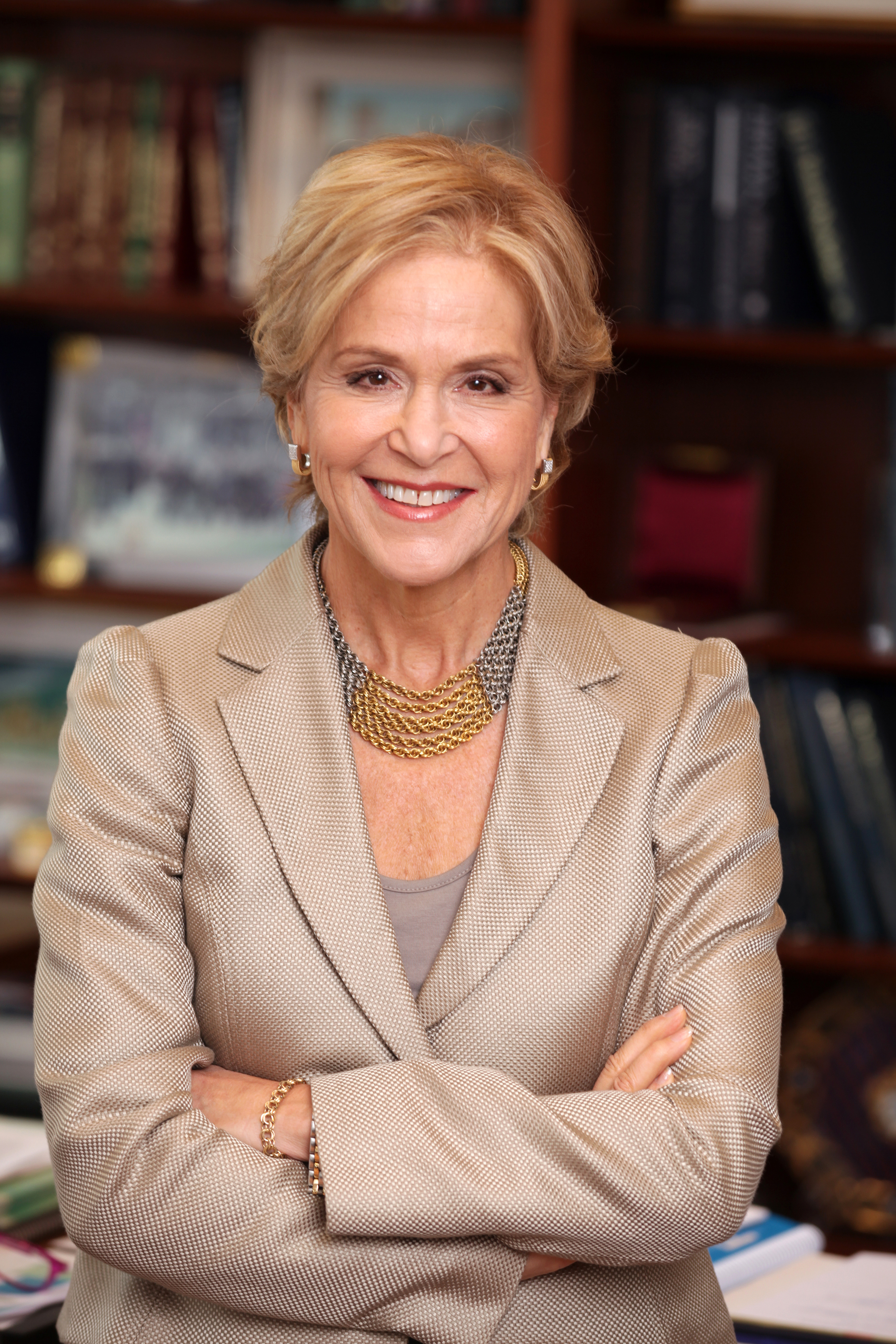
Judith Rodin received an honorary degree in Human Letters in 2007. Rodin is the first female president of an Ivy League university, the University of Pennsylvania, and is also the 12th president of the Rockefeller Foundation.

2000

- Thomas R. Chech, Science
- Robert W. Deutsch, Science
- Mayo Shattuck III, Public Service

2001

- Marian Wright Edelman, Public Service
- Hon. Barbara Hoffman, Public Service
- Bob Kahn, Science
- Pete Rawlings, Public Service

2004

- William Foege, Science
- Ursula Burns, Engineering
- William A. Haseltine, Science

2005

- Mary Ann E. Mears, Fine Arts

2006

- Soloman H. Snyder, Science
- Richard Broadhead, Humane Letters
- Alan Lightman, Humanities

2007

- Betsy and George Sherman, Public Service
- Judith Rodin, Humane Letters
- William Brody, Science

2008

- Virginia Dresher, Public Service
- Paul Sarbanes, Public Service
- Franco Einaudi, Science
- Claude Steele, Science

2009

- Thomas Friedman, Humane Letters
- Shirley M. Tilghman, Science
- Peter Agre, Science
- Karen Davis, Public Service

== Honorary degree recipients, 2010-present ==
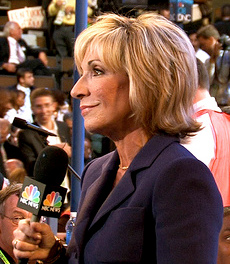
Andrea Mitchell was honored with a Doctor of Public Service at the 2015 Spring Commencement

2010

- G. Wayne Clough, Science

2011

- Rodney C. Adkins, Science
- Jeffrey R. Immelt, Public Service
- Marie M. Klawe, Public Service

2014

- Mary Schmidt Campbell, Fine Arts

2015

- Andrea Mitchell, Public Service
