= Carol L. Silva =

American political scientist

- Born: 1967 (age 58–59)
- Education: University of New Mexico; University of Rochester
- Scientific career
- Fields: Political science
- Workplaces: University of New Mexico; Texas A&M University; University of Oklahoma
- Doctoral advisor: David L. Weimer

Carol L. Silva (born 1967) is an American political scientist and academic administrator who is the Edith Kinney Gaylord Presidential Professor of Political Science and a senior associate vice president for research and partnerships at the University of Oklahoma.

== Life ==
Silva was born in 1967. She earned a B.A. in political science from the University of New Mexico in 1989. Silva earned a M.A. (1996) and a Ph.D. (1998) in political science and public policy from the University of Rochester. Her dissertation was titled, Assessing the Value of the Contingent Valuation Method: Application to the Selection of Nuclear Waste Transport Routes. David L. Weimer was her doctoral advisor.

Silva was a research scientist at the University of New Mexico Institute for Public Policy from 1994 to 2001. From 1999 to 2000, Silva was a research associate at the center for economic research at the University of Rochester. She was an assistant professor in the department of political science at Texas A&M University from 2001 to 2003 and at its Bush School of Government and Public Service from 2003 to 2007. Silva joined the faculty at the University of Oklahoma in 2007. She is the Edith Kinney Gaylord Presidential Professor of Political Science and a senior associate vice president for research and partnerships. In 2023, she was elected a fellow of the National Academy of Public Administration.
