= Arthur L. Money =

American engineer, businessman and government official

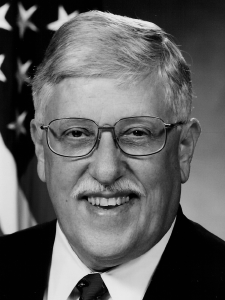

Assistant Secretary of Defense for Command, Control, Communications and Intelligence
- In office 7 October 1999 – 7 April 2001
- President: Bill Clinton; George W. Bush
- Preceded by: Emmett Paige Jr.
- Succeeded by: John P. Stenbit

Assistant Secretary of the Air Force for Research
- In office January 26, 1996 – February 1998
- President: Bill Clinton
- Preceded by: Darleen A. Druyun (Acting)
- Succeeded by: Lawrence J. Delaney

Personal details
- Born: Arthur L. Money
- Education: San Jose State University (B.Sc.); University of Santa Clara(M.Sc.)

Arthur "Art" L. Money is an American engineer, businessman and government official who served as the Assistant Secretary of Defense for Command, Control, Communications and Intelligence (ASD C3I) from 7 October 1999 to 7 April 2001. He concurrently served as the Department of Defense's Chief Information Officer (CIO) from February 1998 to April 2001.

Art Money also served as the Assistant Secretary of the Air Force for Research and as the CIO of the Air Force from January 1996 to February 1998.

Before his government service, Money was the president of ESL Inc., a subsidiary of TRW Inc. from January 1990 to December 1994. On ESL's consolidation into TRW's Avionics and Surveillance Group in 1995, he became Vice President and Deputy General Manager for TRW Avionics and Surveillance Group, until January 1996.

== Education ==
Art Money obtained a Bachelor of Science degree in mechanical engineering from San Jose State University in 1965 and a Masters of Science in mechanical engineering from the University of Santa Clara in 1970. In 1985, he attended Harvard University's Executive Security Program; and in 1988 attended the Massachusetts Institute of Technology's (MIT) Program for Senior Executives.

== Career ==
=== Aerospace industry ===
Money worked as an engineer at the Lockheed Missiles and Space Company in Sunnyvale, California from February 1962 to February 1972.

He then joined ESL Inc. and worked as an engineer, manager and director of various units until 1978. In January 1980, he was appointed as Vice President at ESL Inc., and served until December 1989. In January 1990, he was appointed as the president of ESL Inc. On ESL's consolidation into TRW's Avionics and Surveillance Group in 1995, he became Vice President and Deputy General Manager for TRW Avionics and Surveillance Group, until January 1996.

=== US government ===
Art Money was appointed as the Assistant Secretary of the Air Force for Research, Development and Acquisition in January 1996, after being confirmed to the role by the United States Senate. He served in this role until February 1998, when he was appointed as a 'Senior Civilian Official' to the Office of the Assistant Secretary of Defense for Command, Control, Communications and Intelligence (OASD C3I).

In October 1999, he was appointed as the Assistant Secretary of Defense for Command, Control, Communications and Intelligence (ASD C3I) after confirmation by the United States Senate. He would serve in this role until retirement in April 2001.

=== After government ===
Since leaving the government, Money has been a member of various US governmental advisory boards, including the NSA Advisory Board, the Chairman of the FBI Director’s Advisory Board, and on the Defense Science Board; panels and commissions; and served as a member of the board of directors of several US public companies.

== Awards and honors ==
- National Academy of Engineering, Member, 2013, for "engineering developments and technical leadership in support of U.S. national security efforts."
- Intelligence and National Security Alliance William Oliver Baker Award, 2012
- National Geospatial-Intelligence Agency (NGA) Medallion of Excellence, June 2006
- Intelligence Community Seal Medallion, April 2001
- Defense Intelligence Agency Director's Award, March 2001
- National Imagery and Mapping Agency Medallion for Excellence, March 2001
- Department of Defense Distinguished Public Service Award (Bronze Palm), January 2001
- Department of the Navy Distinguished Public Service Award, January 2001
- National Reconnaissance Office Distinguished Public Service Award, January 2001
- Association of Old Crows Executive Management Award, 1999
- Air Force Association Theodore von Kármán Award for Science and Engineering, 1998
- Department of the Air Force Distinguished Civilian Service Award, October 1997
- San Jose State University, Distinguished Engineering Award, 1995
