= Teri Takai =

American politician and Chief Information Officer

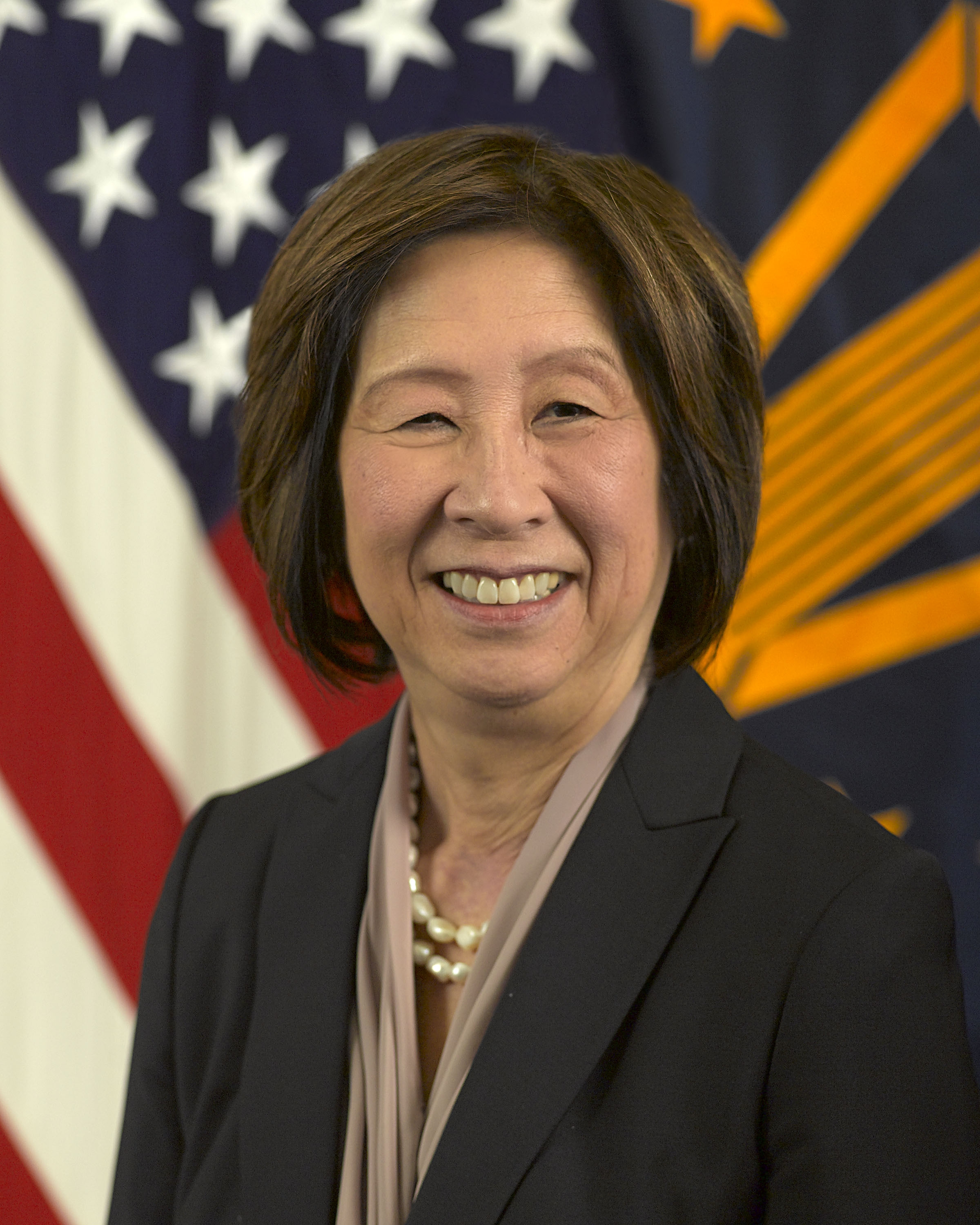

Chief information officer of the United States Department of Defense
- In office October 26, 2010 – May 2, 2014
- President: Barack Obama
- Succeeded by: Terry Halvorsen

Personal details
- Education: University of Michigan (BA, MA)

Teri M. Takai is an American public servant who served as the United States Department of Defense's Chief information officer (CIO) from 2012 to 2014. Takai also served the acting Assistant Secretary of Defense for Networks and Information Integration (2010 to 2012). She resigned in May 2014.

Takai is a member of the board of directors for FirstNet, a national first-responders network.

She received a Bachelor of Arts in Mathematics and a Master's in Management, both from the University of Michigan. She served as Chief Information Officer for the State of California and a member of the Governor of California's cabinet. She has also served as Director of the Michigan Department of Information Technology and as the State of Michigan's CIO.

Takai was named one of InformationWeek's 2013 most influential government CIOs.
