= Kirsten Davies =

American cybersecurity adviser

- Davies in 2026

Acting United States National Cyber Director
- Incumbent
- Assumed office November 19, 2026
- President: Donald Trump
- Preceded by: Sean Cairncross

Chief Information Officer of the Department of Defense
- Incumbent
- Assumed office December 23, 2025
- President: Donald Trump
- Preceded by: John Sherman

Kirsten A. Davies is an American cybersecurity adviser who has served as the chief information officer of the Department of Defense since 2025 and is Acting United States National Cyber Director since November 19, 2026.

== Early and personal life ==
Davies has stated she "grew up all over the world", spending some time in Germany, Canada, and the US. She was married and divorced sometime before 2020.

== Education ==
Davies graduated in 1992 with a Bachelor of Arts degree in International Politics and Government from the University of Puget Sound.

== Career ==
Davies has worked as chief information security officer for Unilever; senior vice president and chief information security officer at the Estee Lauder Companies; managing director and group chief security officer at Barclays Africa; vice president of enterprise security strategy and transformation solution at Hewlett-Packard; global deputy CISO at Siemens; and senior associate at Booz Allen Hamilton. She co-founded the Institute for Cyber, a non-profit organization. Davies has also been a member of the National Security Institute's Cyber and Tech Security Council.

=== Chief Information Officer of the Department of Defense ===
On May 9, 2025, President Donald Trump nominated Davies to serve as the chief information officer of the Department of Defense. In September, over one hundred cybersecurity experts sent a letter to the Senate Committee on Armed Services urging senators to advance Davies's nomination. Davies appeared before the committee on September 18.

=== National Cyber Director ===
On November 19, 2026, President Donald Trump named Davies as the acting United States national cyber director, succeeding Sean Cairncross.
