= John P. Stenbit =

American engineer and public official

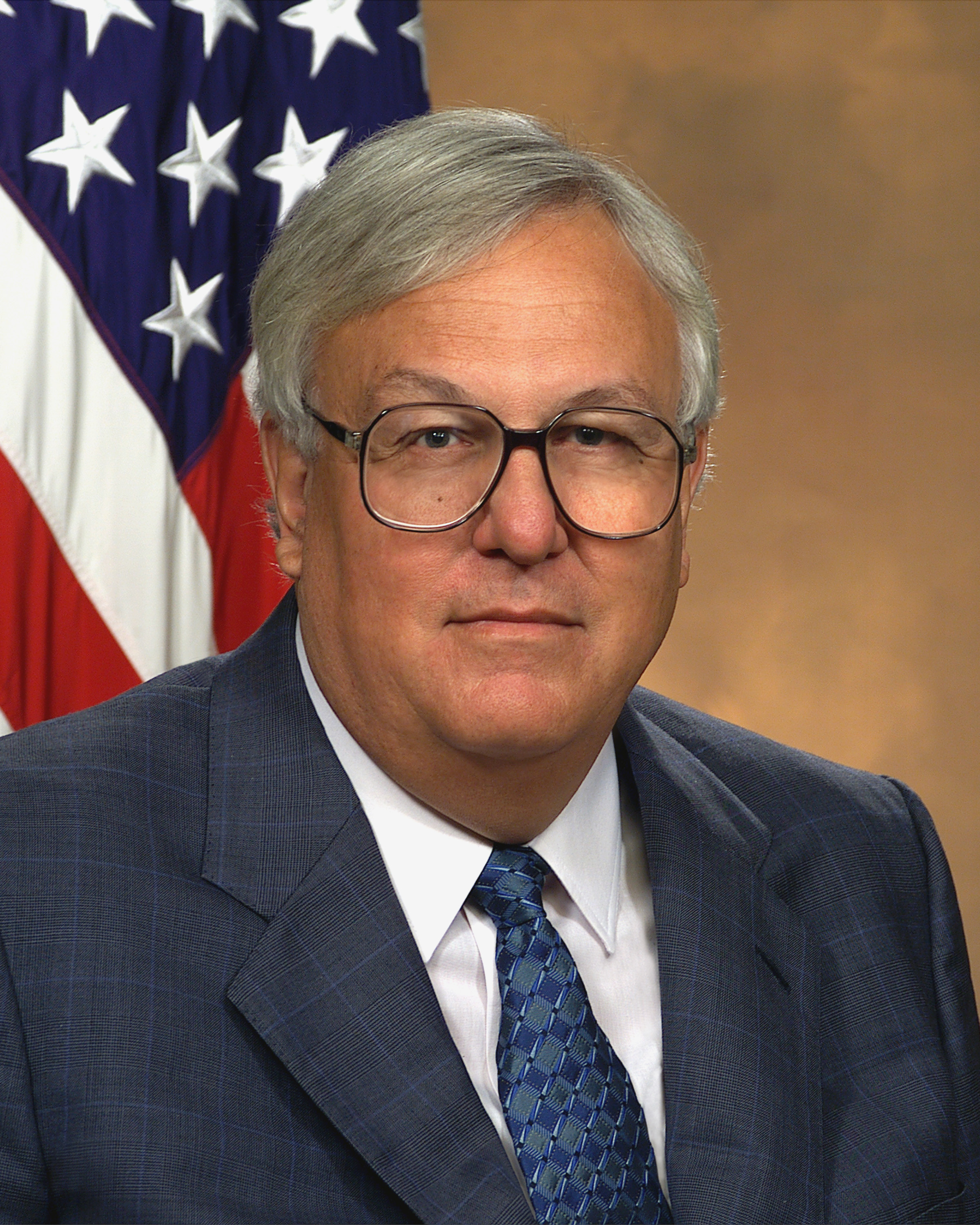

Assistant Secretary of Defense (Networks and Information Integration)
- In office 8 May 2003 – 6 March 2004
- President: George W. Bush
- Preceded by: himself as Assistant Secretary of Defense C3I
- Succeeded by: Linton Wells II (Acting)

Assistant Secretary of Defense for Command, Control, Communications and Intelligence
- In office 7 August 2001 – 8 May 2003
- Preceded by: Arthur L. Money
- Succeeded by: himself as Assistant Secretary of Defense (NII)

Personal details
- Born: John P. Stenbit; Mooresville, North Carolina
- Education: California Institute of Technology, Eindhoven University of Technology

John P. Stenbit is an American engineer and public official who served as the Assistant Secretary of Defense for Networks and Information (NII) (2003-2004) and Assistant Secretary of Defense (Communications, Command, Control, and Intelligence) (C3I) (2001) during the Presidency of George W. Bush.

== Early life and education ==
John Stenbit graduated from the California Institute of Technology in 1962 with bachelor's and master's degrees in electrical engineering. He attended the Eindhoven University of Technology as a Fulbright Fellow and Aerospace Corporation Fellow from 1962 to 1963.

== Career ==
Stenbit has worked in both the public and private sectors, working on satellites, sensors, telecommunications, IT, and military command and control. He worked for TRW Inc. from 1977 to 2001, retiring as an executive vice president. He served as the Assistant Secretary of Defense for Communications, Command, Control and Intelligence (ASD C3I) from 2001 to 2003, until that portfolio was transferred to the ASD (NII), the Under Secretary of Defense for Intelligence, and the Director of the Defense Intelligence Agency. Following this re-organization, he stayed on as the Assistant Secretary of Defense (Networks and Information Integration) until 2004.

Stenbit was also the chair of the R&D Advisory Committee to the FAA Administrator, the chair of the Technical Advisory Board to the Director of the CIA, and was previously chair of the National Space-Based Positioning, Navigation, and Timing Advisory Board. He was also a member of the MITRE Board of Trustees (since 2005) and has been the director of Viasat Corp since 2004 and Loral Space & Communications.

He has chaired the Science and Technology Advisory Panel to the Director of Central Intelligence and served as a member of the Science Advisory Group to the directors of Naval Intelligence and the Defense Communications Agency. He also chaired the Research, Engineering and Development Advisory Committee for the Administrator of the Federal Aviation Administration. He has served and consulted on the Defense Science Advisory Board, the Navy Studies Board, and the National Research Council Manufacturing Board.

Stenbit is currently a consultant and member of the Defense Science Board, the National Security Agency Advisory Board (NSAAB), the STRATCOM Advisory Board (SAG), and the National Reconnaissance Office Advisory Group.

== Awards and honors ==
Stenbit is a member of Tau Beta Pi engineering honor society. In 1999, he was inducted into the National Academy of Engineering for "...contributions to the development and leadership in implementation of system architecture for complex military and communication systems." He has received the Secretary of Defense Medals for Outstanding and Exceptional Public Service.
