= Thomas P. Quinn =

Dr. Thomas P. Quinn
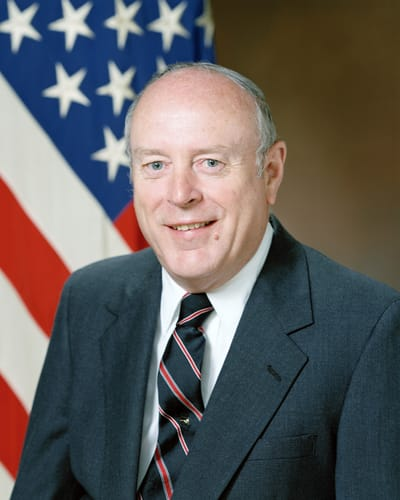

(Acting) Assistant Secretary of Defense for Command, Control, Communications and Intelligence
- In office July 18, 1987 – May 23, 1988
- President: George H. W. Bush
- Preceded by: Donald C. Latham
- Succeeded by: Gordon A. Smith
- In office May 13, 1989 – November 19, 1989
- President: Ronald Reagan
- Preceded by: Gordon A. Smith
- Succeeded by: Duane P. Andrews

Principal Deputy Assistant Secretary of Defense for Command, Control, Communications and Intelligence
- In office July 1987 – January 1991
- President: George H. W. Bush

Deputy Assistant Secretary of Defense for Command, Control, Communications and Intelligence
- In office July 1993 – March 1994
- President: Bill Clinton
- In office February 1980 – July 1987
- President: Ronald Reagan

Personal details
- Born: March 20, 1930 Freeland, Pennsylvania
- Died: November 6, 2022 (aged 92) Fairfax, Virginia
- Spouse: Betty Quinn (m. 1961)
- Children: Gary Quinn, Robert Quinn
- Education: Pennsylvania State University (PhD, MSE, BSE)

Military service
- Branch/service: United States Navy
- Years of service: 1948 - 1953
- Rank: Electronics Technician Petty Officer 1st Class
- Battles/wars: Korean War

Dr. Thomas P. Quinn (March 20, 1930 – November 6, 2022) served as the (Acting) United States Assistant Secretary of Defense for Command, Control, Communications and Intelligence (C³I) from July 18, 1987 - May 23, 1988 and May 13, 1989 - November 19, 1989.

== Early life and education ==
Born in Freeland, Pennsylvania, Dr. Quinn attended Foster Township and St. Ann's High Schools. After high school, he served in the U.S. Navy from 1948 to 1953. He returned home to Pennsylvania to attend the Pennsylvania State University, where he graduated with a B.S. in Electrical Engineering in 1957, at which time he was also awarded the Sperry Gyroscope Fellowship for graduate study.

He went on to receive a M.S. in Electrical Engineering from the Pennsylvania State University in 1958 and started a full-time instructor position in the College of Electrical Engineering. He also devoted a portion of his time to research in the Ionosphere Research Laboratory. In 1964, he received a Ph.D from the Pennsylvania State University.

== Career ==
From 1964 to 1966, Dr. Quinn was employed by Penn State as an Assistant Professor of Electrical Engineering. During this time he also served as a consultant for the Stanford Research Institution.

From 1966 to 1976, Dr. Quinn served as the Director of Field Projects for the Office of Naval Research. From 1976 to 1979, he worked as the Special Assistant for Systems in the Office of the Assistant Secretary of the Navy for Research, Engineering and Systems.

In 1980, he served as Deputy Assistant Secretary of Defense for Command, Control, Communications and Intelligence (C³I). In 1987, he served as Principal Deputy Assistant Secretary of Defense for C³I until 1991. During this time, he served as Acting Assistant Secretary of Defense for C³I from July 18, 1987 - May 23, 1988 and May 13, 1989 - November 19, 1989. From 1991 to 1993, he served as Deputy Assistant Secretary for Strategic and Tactical Command, Control, and Communications (S&TC3) within the Office of the Assistant Secretary for C³I. In 1993, he went back to serving as Deputy Assistant Secretary of Defense for C³I until 1994.

During his time in the DoD, Dr. Quinn played a key role in the restructuring of the NAVSTAR program and the development of MILSTAR.

== Awards and Recognition ==
- In 1967, he received the Arthur S. Flemming Award.
- In 1968, he received the Navy Superior Civilian Service Award.
- In 1984, he received the Presidential Rank Award of Distinguished Executive, presented by Ronald Reagan.
- In 1986 he was awarded the Outstanding Engineering Alumni Award from Penn State's College of Engineering.
- In 1989, he received the Presidential Rank Award of Meritorious Executive.

== Personal ==
Dr. Quinn married Betty Lyons on April 3, 1961. The couple had two sons and two grandchildren. Dr. Quinn and his wife are interred at Arlington National Cemetery.

== Publications ==
- "A Coherent Detection System for a Rocket-Borne Ionospheric Sounder", Ionosphere Research Laboratory, PSU Scientific Report No. 113, Dec. 1958.
- "Instrumentation for Rocket Measurements of Electron Densities in the Ionosphere", Ionosphere Research Laboratory, PSU Scientific Report No. 127, Jan. 1960
- "Feasibility Study of a Separating Capsule Rocket Experiment for the Accurate Determination of Absolute Electron Densities to a Height of Several Thousand Kilometers", Ionosphere Research Laboratory, PSU Scientific Report No.152, Nov. 1961
- "A Proposed Rocket Experiment for Measuring Electron Densities in the Upper F Region", Oct. 1961
- "The Recombination Coefficient for the Nighttime F Layer. Journal of Geophysical Research, VOL 68, NO. 4, Feb. 1963
- "Latitude Variation of the Parameters of the Nighttime F Region", IEEE Professional Technical Group on Antennas and Propagation Newsletter, vol. 6, no. 2, May 1963, doi: 10.1109/MAP.1963.28061.
- "A Study of the Ion-Neutral Particle Collision Frequency and the Diffusion Coefficients for Atomic Oxygen Ions in the F Region", T.P. Quinn and J.S. Nisbet, Dec. 1963.
- "Recombination and Transport in the F Region of the Ionosphere," Journal of Geophysical Research, Jan. 1965
- "Tactical Communications via Satellites," VOLS 1 and 2, J. Kaiser, IDA Study S-211, Oct. 1965
- "Measurement of Electron Density in the Upper Atmosphere by Propagation Measurements between Sections of a High Altitude Rocket, " J.S. Nisbet, T.P. Quinn, and J. Widmaier. Space Research, VII, 417-425, 1967.
- "SANGUINE System Implementation Plan", Department of the Navy Report, Classified, Sept. 1967
- "Nuclear Effects on VLF Radio Propagation (U)" Classified, April 1968
- "An Examination of the Aircraft-Submarine Communications Problem (U)" Classified NATO Report A/C-243 (COMACSUB)R/1, July 1970
- "EW and C3 Countermeasures: The Official View", Journal of Electronic Defense, November–December 1980, pp. 18–26
