= Department of Defense Chief Information Officer =

Position within the American Department of Defense

United States Department of Defense Chief Information Officer
- DoD-CIO
- Seal of the United States Department of Defense

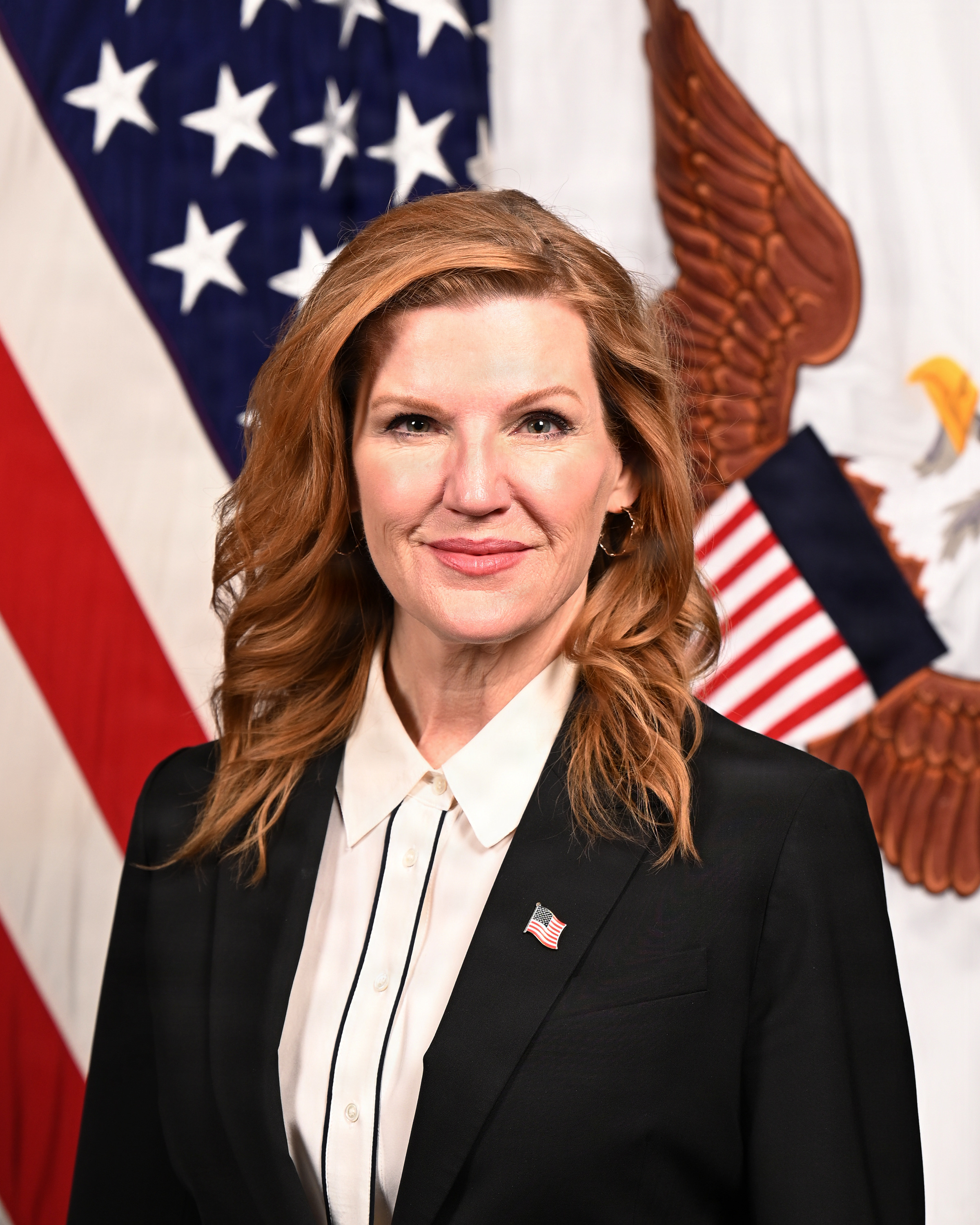
- Incumbent; Kirsten Davies since December 23, 2025
- United States Department of Defense; Office of the Secretary of Defense
- Reports to: United States Secretary of Defense
- Seat: The Pentagon, Arlington County, Virginia
- Appointer: The president; with Senate advice and consent
- Term length: No fixed term
- Constituting instrument: 10 U.S.C. § 142
- Precursor: Assistant Secretary of Defense (Networks and Information Integration)
- Inaugural holder: Teri M. Takai
- Formation: 2012
- Salary: Executive Schedule Level IV
- Website: Official website

The Department of Defense chief information officer is an appointed position that provided management and oversight of all DoD information technology, including national security systems. Prior to 2012, the chief information officer was the assistant secretary of defense for networks and information integration (ASD(NII)), which served as the chief information officer (CIO) of the United States Department of Defense (DoD).

The ASD(NII)/DoD CIO was the principal staff assistant and advisor to the secretary and deputy secretary of defense on networks and network-centric policies and concepts; command, control and communications (C3); non-intelligence space matters; enterprise-wide integration of DoD information matters; information technology (IT), including National Security Systems (NSS); information resources management (IRM); spectrum management; network operations; information systems; information assurance (IA); positioning, navigation, and timing (PNT) policy, including airspace and military-air-traffic control activities; sensitive information integration; contingency support and migration planning; and related matters.

The ASD(NII)/DoD CIO had responsibilities for integrating information and related activities and services across the Department of Defense. The ASD(NII)/DoD CIO also served as the DoD Enterprise-level strategist and business adviser from the information, IT, and IRM perspective; Information and IT architect for the DoD enterprise; and, DoD-wide IT and IRM executive.

The director, Defense Information Systems Agency (DISA), reported to the ASD(NII)/DoD CIO.

In August 2010, Secretary of Defense Robert Gates announced that the position of ASD(NII) would be eliminated. On January 11, 2012, the position of ASD(NII) was disestablished. Most of the position's responsibilities were retained by the DoD CIO.

== History ==
This office was previously known as the Assistant Secretary of Defense (Command, Control, Communications and Intelligence), or ASD(C^{3}I), and was redesignated ASD(NII) in May 2003.

ASD(C^{3}I) traces its origins back to the Assistant to the Secretary of Defense (Telecommunications), an advisory position established in May 1970. A single person held this position before it was replaced in January 1972 by the Assistant Secretary of Defense (Telecommunications), an office with more weight in the Pentagon bureaucracy. The post was eliminated in January 1974, with responsibilities transferred to the Director, Telecommunications and Command and Control Systems under Defense Directive 5135.1.

In March 1977, a new post, the Assistant Secretary of Defense (Command, Control, Communications and Intelligence), was established by Defense Directive 5137.1, replacing both the Director, Telecommunications and Command and Control Systems and the Assistant Secretary of Defense (Intelligence)/Director of Defense Intelligence. (The ASD(I) had been established in November 1971, with some functions transferred from the Assistant Secretary of Defense (Administration). From July 1976 to March 1977, the ASD(I) held the additional designation of Director of Defense Intelligence.)

Starting in October 1977, the ASD(C^{3}I) also served as Principal Deputy Under Secretary of Defense for Research and Engineering. In March 1981, the office was retitled Deputy Undersecretary of Defense for Communications, Command, Control, and Intelligence, a position with more bureaucratic weight than that of an assistant secretary. However, the Department of Defense Authorization Act of 1984 (P.L. 98-94), passed in September 1983, mandated the existence of an ASD(C^{3}I). Thus, this post reverted to the title assistant secretary of defense in April 1985 (following Defense Directive 5137.1). The ASD(C^{3}I) was the principal staff officer to Secretary of Defense in his role as executive for the National Communications System. The ASD(C^{3}I) also had responsibilities to oversee the activities of DISA, the Defense Intelligence Agency, and the Defense Security Service. Following Pentagon reorganizations in 2003, the portfolio of ASD(C^{3}I) was transferred to the ASD(NII), the Under Secretary of Defense for Intelligence, the Director of the Defense Intelligence Agency and elsewhere.

== Elimination ==
On May 17, 2010, Secretary of Defense Robert M. Gates directed an independent panel of corporate executives (known as the Defense Business Board) to make recommendations on options to materially reduce DoD overhead and increase efficiency in internal business operations. On July 22, the Defense Business Board offered a series of proposals on how the Pentagon could cut $100 billion from its budget over the next five years. According to Arnold Punaro, the group's chair and retired executive at SAIC, "The task group is identifying many of the tough choices that must be made, not only because it is good business management, but today's fiscal environment and future warfighting requirements will not tolerate these inefficiencies." In his remarks, Punaro recommended downsizing the Combatant Commands and all OSD organizations, "particularly the elimination of Networks and Information Integration."

On August 9, Secretary Gates announced at a press conference that DoD will be eliminating the office of the ASD(NII), and DISA will assume its information technology operational responsibilities. According to Gates, " The Office of the Assistant Secretary of Defense for Networks and Information Integration or NII was set up in 2003 when policy, oversight and advocacy functions for command, control and communications split off from intelligence. The resulting arrangement for dealing with enterprise IT and hardware issues, which includes a similar function for the J-6 on the Joint Staff, has since become redundant, costly and cumbersome."

At the same time, Gates also announced that DoD would be standing up a "refashioned and strengthened" CIO, a position whose existence is mandated in the Clinger-Cohen Act. Because the position no longer includes the permanent assistant secretary title, Senate confirmation is no longer required.

On January 11, 2012, the position of ASD (NII) was disestablished.

== Past assistant secretaries ==
The table below includes both the various titles of this post over time, as well as all the holders of those offices.

Assistant secretaries of defense (networks and information integration)
Name	Tenure	SecDef(s) served under	President(s) served under
Assistant to the Secretary of Defense (Telecommunications)
Louis A. deRosa	July 22, 1970 - July 1, 1971	Melvin R. Laird	Richard Nixon
Assistant Secretary of Defense (Telecommunications)
Eberhardt Rechtin	January 14, 1972 - February 15, 1973 (Acting); February 15, 1973 - September 29, 1973	Melvin R. Laird; Elliot L. Richardson; James R. Schlesinger	Richard Nixon
David L. Solomon (Acting)	September 30, 1973 - January 17, 1974	James R. Schlesinger	Richard Nixon
Director, Telecommunications and Command and Control Systems
David L. Solomon (Acting)	January 17, 1974 - February 18, 1974	James R. Schlesinger	Richard Nixon
Thomas Reed	February 19, 1974 - January 2, 1976	James R. Schlesinger; Donald H. Rumsfeld	Richard Nixon; Gerald Ford
Assistant Secretary of Defense (Communications, Command, Control, and Intelligence)
Gerald P. Dinneen	April 4, 1978 - January 20, 1981	Harold Brown	Jimmy Carter
Harry L. Van Trees (Acting)	January 21, 1981 - July 25, 1981	Caspar W. Weinberger	Ronald Reagan
Donald C. Latham	July 26, 1981 - August 16, 1984	Caspar W. Weinberger	Ronald Reagan
Donald C. Latham	August 6, 1984 (sic) - July 6, 1987	Caspar W. Weinberger	Ronald Reagan
Thomas P. Quinn (Acting)	July 18, 1987 - May 23, 1988	Caspar W. Weinberger; Frank C. Carlucci III	Ronald Reagan
Gordon A. Smith	May 24, 1988 - May 12, 1989	Frank C. Carlucci III; William Howard Taft IV (Acting); Richard B. Cheney	Ronald Reagan; George H. W. Bush
Thomas P. Quinn (Acting)	May 13, 1989 - November 19, 1989	Richard B. Cheney	George H. W. Bush
Duane P. Andrews	November 20, 1989 - January 20, 1993	Richard B. Cheney	George H. W. Bush
Emmett Paige, Jr.	June 10, 1993 - May 23, 1997	Leslie Aspin, Jr. William J. Perry; William S. Cohen	William Clinton
Arthur L. Money	February 20, 1998 - October 5, 1999 (Senior Civilian Official); October 5, 1999 - April 7, 2001	William S. Cohen; Donald H. Rumsfeld	William Clinton; George W. Bush
John P. Stenbit	August 7, 2001 - May 8, 2003	Donald H. Rumsfeld	George W. Bush
Assistant Secretary of Defense (Networks and Information Integration)/DoD CIO
John P. Stenbit	May 8, 2003 - March 6, 2004	Donald H. Rumsfeld	George W. Bush
Linton Wells II (Acting)	March 6, 2004 - November 14, 2005	Donald H. Rumsfeld	George W. Bush
John Grimes	November 14, 2005 - April 30, 2009	Donald H. Rumsfeld; Robert M. Gates	George W. Bush; Barack Obama
Cheryl Roby (Acting)	May 1, 2009 - October 26, 2010	Robert M. Gates	Barack Obama
Teri M. Takai (Acting)	October 26, 2010 - January 11, 2012	Robert M. Gates; Leon Panetta	Barack Obama
Department of Defense Chief Information Officer (DoD CIO)
Teri M. Takai	January 11, 2012 - May 2, 2014	Leon Panetta; Chuck Hagel	Barack Obama
Terry Halvorsen	May 21, 2014 - January 20, 2017	Chuck Hagel; Ash Carter	Barack Obama
John Zangardi (Acting)	January 20, 2017 - December 8, 2017	Jim Mattis	Donald Trump
Essye Miller (Acting)	December 8, 2017 - May 7, 2018	Jim Mattis	Donald Trump
Dana Deasy	May 7, 2018 - January 20, 2021	Jim Mattis; Mark Esper	Donald Trump
John Sherman (Acting)	January 20, 2021 - December 17, 2021	Lloyd Austin	Joe Biden
John Sherman	December 17, 2021 - June 28, 2024	Lloyd Austin	Joe Biden
Leslie Beavers (Acting)	July 1, 2024 - March 3, 2025	Lloyd Austin	Joe Biden
Katie Arrington (Acting)	March 3, 2025 – December 23, 2025	Pete Hegseth	Donald Trump
Kirsten Davies	December 23, 2025 – Present	Pete Hegseth	Donald Trump

== See also ==
- Clinger-Cohen Act
- Command and Control Research Program (CCRP), within the Office of the ASD(NII)
- Defense Information Systems Agency
- Federal Enterprise Architecture
- Global Information Grid
- Joint Task Force-Global Network Operations
- NetOps
- Network-centric warfare
