= John Sherman (intelligence) =

American intelligence government official

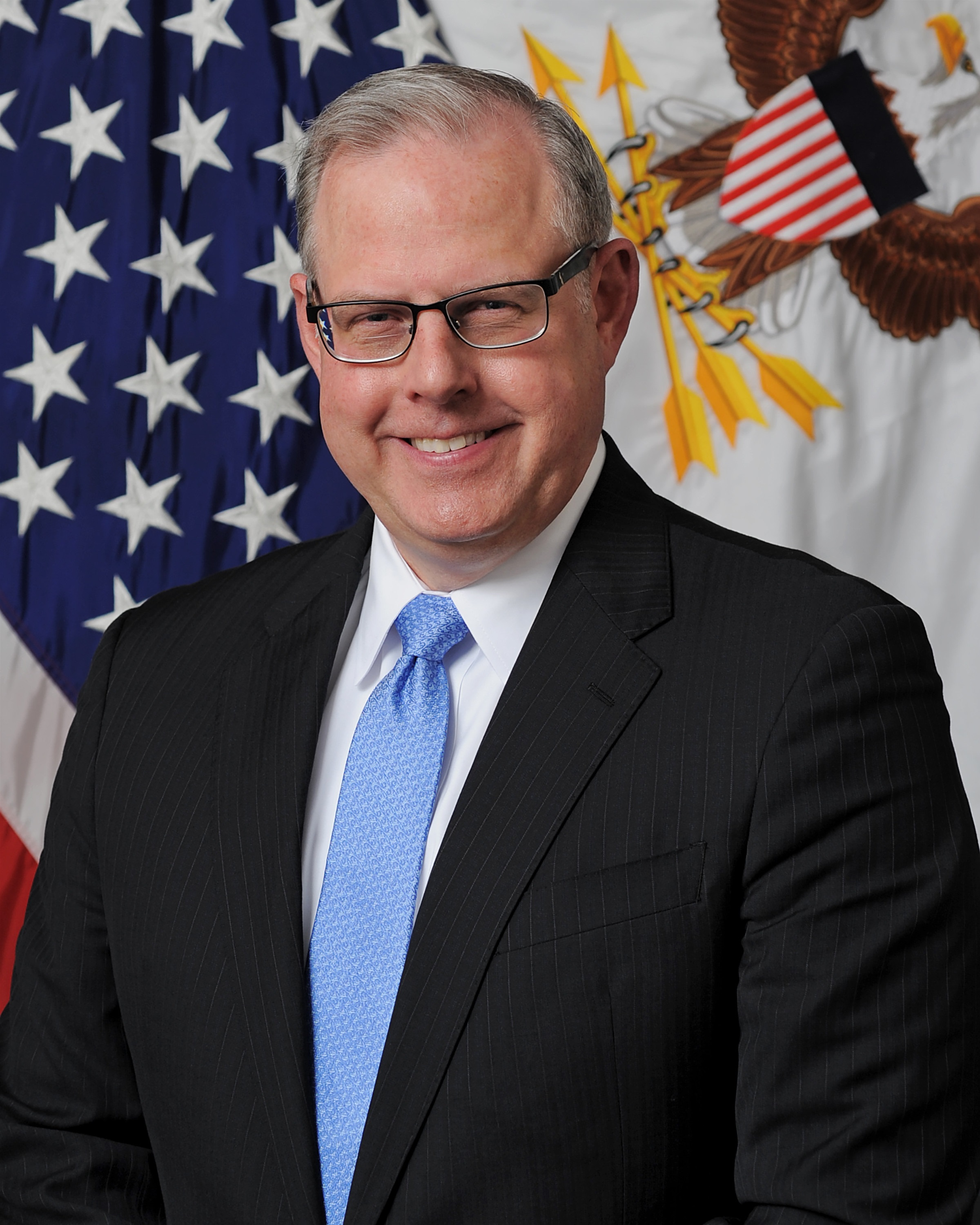
- Official portrait, 2021

Dean of the Bush School of Government & Public Service
- Incumbent
- Assumed office August 1, 2024
- Preceded by: Frank B. Ashley III

Chief Information Officer of the Department of Defense
- In office January 20, 2021 – June 28, 2024
- President: Joe Biden
- Preceded by: Dana Deasy
- Succeeded by: Kirsten Davies

Personal details
- Education: Texas A&M University (BA); University of Houston (MPA)

Military service
- Allegiance: United States
- Branch/service: United States Army
- Unit: 24th Infantry Division; Air Defense Artillery

John Bradley Sherman is an American intelligence official who had served as the chief information officer at the Department of Defense from December 17, 2021 to June 2024. Prior to that, he served from June 2020 to January 2021 as the Principal Deputy DOD Chief Information Officer. Between 2017 and 2020 he served as Associate Director and Chief Information Officer of the Intelligence Community (IC) at the Office of the Director of National Intelligence.

== Education ==
Sherman graduated from Texas A&M University with a Bachelor of Arts in History, where he also served as Commander of the Texas A&M University Corps of Cadets. He later earned a Master's in Public Administration from the University of Houston. Following graduation from Texas A&M, he was a US Army Air Defense Artillery officer in the 24th Infantry Division. He is a graduate of the Department of Defense Capstone course, ODNI's "Leading the IC" course, and the CIA Director's Seminar.

== Career ==
Sherman was formerly the deputy director of CIA's Open Source Enterprise (OSE). Before that, he served in several senior executive positions at NGA, dealing with analysis, collection, homeland security, organizational strategy, and international affairs.

Previously, Sherman was the principal deputy national intelligence officer for military issues on the National Intelligence Council, and as a White House Situation Room duty officer. During his tour in the Situation Room, he was on duty during the September 11 attacks. He began his IC career in 1997 as a CIA imagery analyst assigned to the former National Imagery and Mapping Agency, now known as the National Geospatial-Intelligence Agency.

=== Trump Administration ===
On August 18, 2017, President Donald Trump nominated Sherman to be Chief Information Officer of the US Intelligence Community. Among other priorities, Sherman focused on what he characterized as "The Second Epoch of the Intelligence Community Information Technology Enterprise." Sherman stepped down from the Intelligence CIO position in June 2020, at which time he moved to the Department of Defense to serve as the Principal Deputy Chief Information Officer.

=== Biden administration ===
At the beginning of the Biden Administration, Sherman was named the Acting Department of Defense Chief Information Officer. On September 16, 2021, President Joe Biden nominated Sherman to be the Chief Information Officer in the Department of Defense. The Senate Armed Services Committee held hearings on his nomination on October 28, 2021. On December 8, 2021, the committee favorably reported Sherman's nomination to the Senate floor. The entire Senate confirmed his nomination via voice vote on December 14, 2021.

During Sherman's tenure as CIO, he led the Department of Defense's shift to a multi-cloud environment with its award of the Joint Warfighting Cloud Capability.

Additionally, in early 2022, Sherman was named the Department of Defense Acting Chief Digital and Artificial Intelligence Officer.

After two and a half years it was reported that Sherman would step down from the role at the end of June in 2024.

=== Academia ===
On June 6, 2024, Texas A&M announced that Sherman was selected as the next Dean of the Bush School of Government and Public Service, effective August 1, 2024.

== Awards and personal life ==
Sherman has received the Distinguished and Meritorious Presidential Rank Awards, the Intelligence Medal of Merit, NGA's Meritorious Civilian Service Medal, and Canada's Chief of Defence Intelligence Medallion. He is married with two grown children.
