= Terry Halvorsen =

American military officer

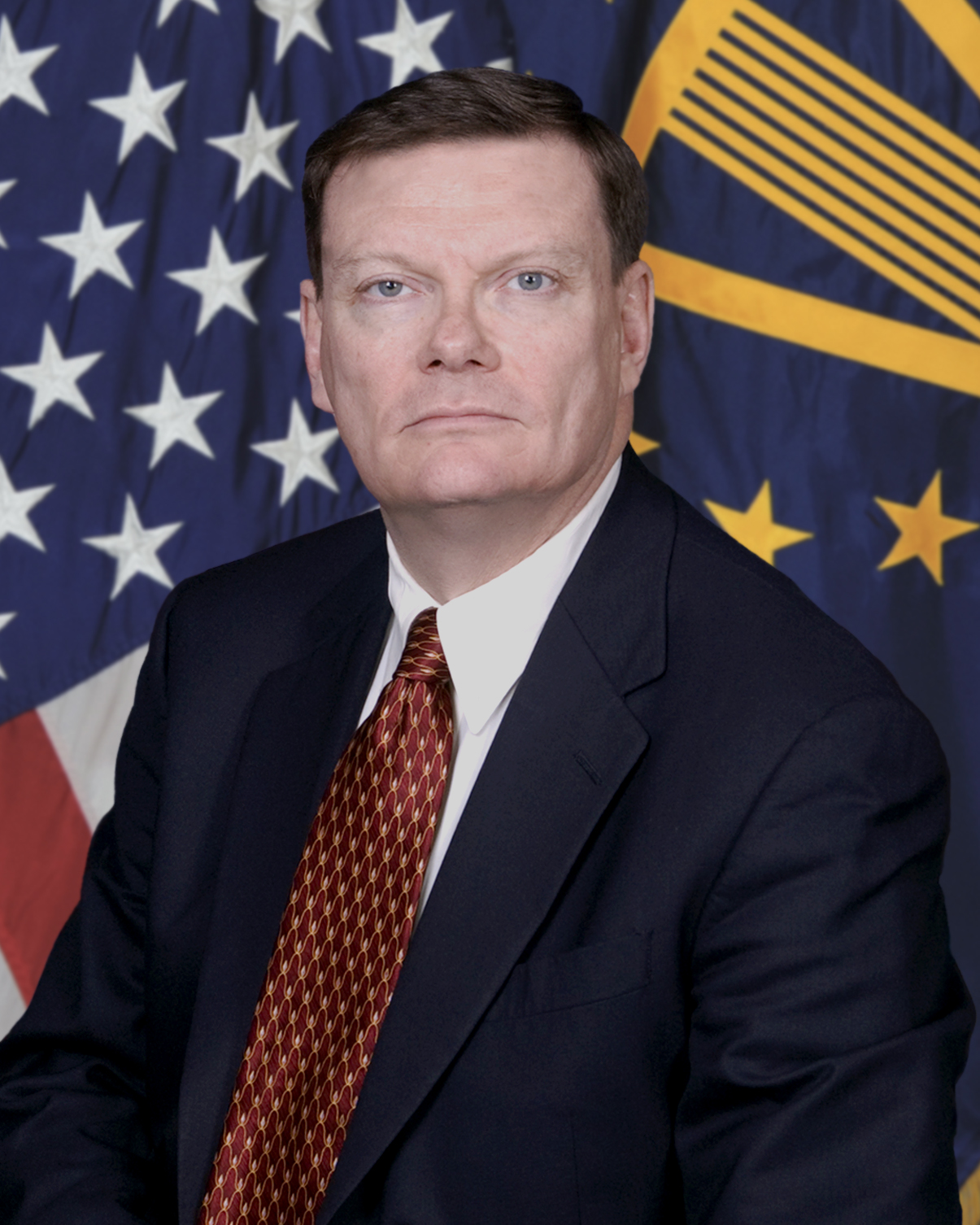

Chief Information Officer of the Department of Defense
- In office 21 May 2014 – 20 January 2017
- President: Barack Obama
- Secretary: Chuck Hagel; Ash Carter
- Preceded by: Teri Takai
- Succeeded by: Dana Deasy

Personal details
- Education: Widener University, University of West Florida

Terry Halvorsen is a retired American military officer who is a former Chief Information Officer at the US Department of Defense. He previously served as the Acting Department of Defense Chief Information Officer and the Department of the Navy Chief Information Officer.

As the DoD CIO, Mr. Halvorsen was the principal advisor to the Secretary of Defense for Information Management / Information Technology and Information Assurance as well as non-intelligence space systems, critical satellite communications, navigation, and timing programs, spectrum and telecommunications. Halvorsen provided strategy, leadership, and guidance to create a unified information management and technology vision for the Department and to ensure the delivery of information technology-based capabilities required to support the broad set of Department missions.

Before serving as the Department of the Navy CIO, Mr. Halvorsen was the deputy commander of the Navy Cyber Forces. He began that position in January 2010 as part of the Navy Cyber reorganization. Previous to that, Halvorsen served as the Deputy Commander, Naval Network Warfare Command.

Halvorsen administered over 16,000 military and civilian personnel supporting over 300 ships and approximately 800,000 globally dispersed computer network users. He was responsible for the business performance of Navy network operations, space operations, information operations and knowledge management.

Halvorsen retired from the US Army after serving as an intelligence officer in a variety of assignments, including Operation Just Cause and Operation Desert Storm. He holds a bachelor's degree in history from Widener University, and a master's degree in educational technology from the University of West Florida. He is a Rotary International Paul Harris Fellow and an Excellence in Government Leadership Fellow.
