= Shattock =

Shattock is a surname. Notable people with the surname include:

- Aaron Shattock (born 1980), Australian rules footballer
- Gordon Shattock (1928—2010), British veterinarian
- Paul Shattock, British autism researcher and scientific consultant
- Robin Shattock (born 1963), British immunologist
- Samuel George Shattock (1852–1924), British pathologist
- Tyler Shattock (born 1990), Canadian ice hockey player
