= Molly Shattuck =

Cheerleader and child rapist

- Born: Molly Ann George; 1967 (age 58–59)
- Education: Ford City High School; Indiana University of Pennsylvania
- Occupation: Former Baltimore Ravens Cheerleader
- Known for: Holding the record for oldest NFL cheerleader until 2009, statutory rape of a minor
- Spouse: Mayo A. Shattuck III (m. 1997–2014)
- Children: 3

Molly Shattuck (née George) is an American socialite, convicted sex offender and child rapist. She is the former wife of businessman Mayo A. Shattuck III. She came to national prominence when she became the then-oldest cheerleader on record for the National Football League when she began cheering for the Baltimore Ravens Cheerleaders at age 38.

Starting in 2014, Shattuck was the subject of national attention when a sex crimes case was opened against her for statutory rape of a minor. In August 2015, she was determined guilty by a Delaware Court.

== Early life ==
Shattuck was born Molly Ann George and attended Ford City High School in Ford City, Pennsylvania. Before graduating in 1985, she was voted Homecoming Queen. After high school she went straight into the Indiana University of Pennsylvania, from where she graduated with a marketing degree.

== Marriage and family ==
In 1997, Shattuck married Mayo A. Shattuck III, millionaire CEO of Constellation Energy, as his second wife. The two had met while she was working at Alex. Brown & Sons as a marketing executive. When Shattuck first got pregnant, she suffered a miscarriage, followed by four more. Eventually, the Shattucks had three healthy children. The three, named Spencer, Wyatt, and Lillian, attended the "posh" private McDonogh School. While married to Mayo, Shattuck played the role of hostess and socialite in Baltimore society.

The couple divorced in 2014 after documents were unsealed in November, revealing a nine-count indictment against Shattuck.

== Cheerleading ==
In an interview with Sports Illustrated, Shattuck stated that she had wanted to be a cheerleader since she was in high school and had added "being an NFL cheerleader" onto her bucket list. In 2005, Shattuck tried out for the Baltimore Ravens Cheerleaders and made the team after lasting through all five cuts. In doing so, she became the oldest cheerleader in NFL history. At age 38, she was an average of 15 years older than the rest of her teammates and the only mother on the squad. She held the distinction as the oldest NFL cheerleader ever until 2009, when 40-year-old Laura Vikmanis became a cheerleader for the Cincinnati Bengals.

When trying out for the squad, the women were not allowed to give their last names to the panel. That helped Shattuck to allay rumors of nepotism, as her husband Mayo had helped broker the sale of the Baltimore Ravens team to its new owner.

Gelf Magazine was critical of Shattuck, stating, "[D]on't forget that being a pro cheerleader is a joke. High school and college cheerleading can involve competition and athletic ability, but pro cheerleading simply requires memorizing a few routines and being really hot. Both of which Shattuck seemed to handle with aplomb in her two years on the squad."

== Sexual assault conviction ==
In 2014, Shattuck developed a relationship with the friend and classmate of her oldest son Spencer. Spencer originally acted as his mother's liaison, texting his friend "Call my mom. She thinks you're hot." After exchanging sexual text messages and explicit photos, the relationship escalated into Shattuck checking the 15-year-old boy out of school for them to have sex in her car. Eventually, the boy joined them on a family outing (sans husband Mayo) to a rented beach house on the Bethany Seashore. The overnight trip resulted in Shattuck performing oral sex on the boy.

When the headmaster at the victim's school received information regarding the alleged sexual abuse, he immediately reported the allegations to authorities. After Shattuck pleaded guilty, Judge E. Scott Bradley sentenced her to serve 48 weekends in prison, register as a sex offender and undergo sexual disorder counseling, and pay for the victim's counseling, and $10,650 in restitution to the victim's family.

== Filmography ==
Year	Title	Role
2015	CNN News Center	Self
2014	International Desk	Self
2008	Secret Millionaire	Self
2000	Super Bowl XXXIV	Self
