= Bush School of Government and Public Service =

Public policy school of Texas A&M University

Coordinates: 30.5977°N 96.3522°W

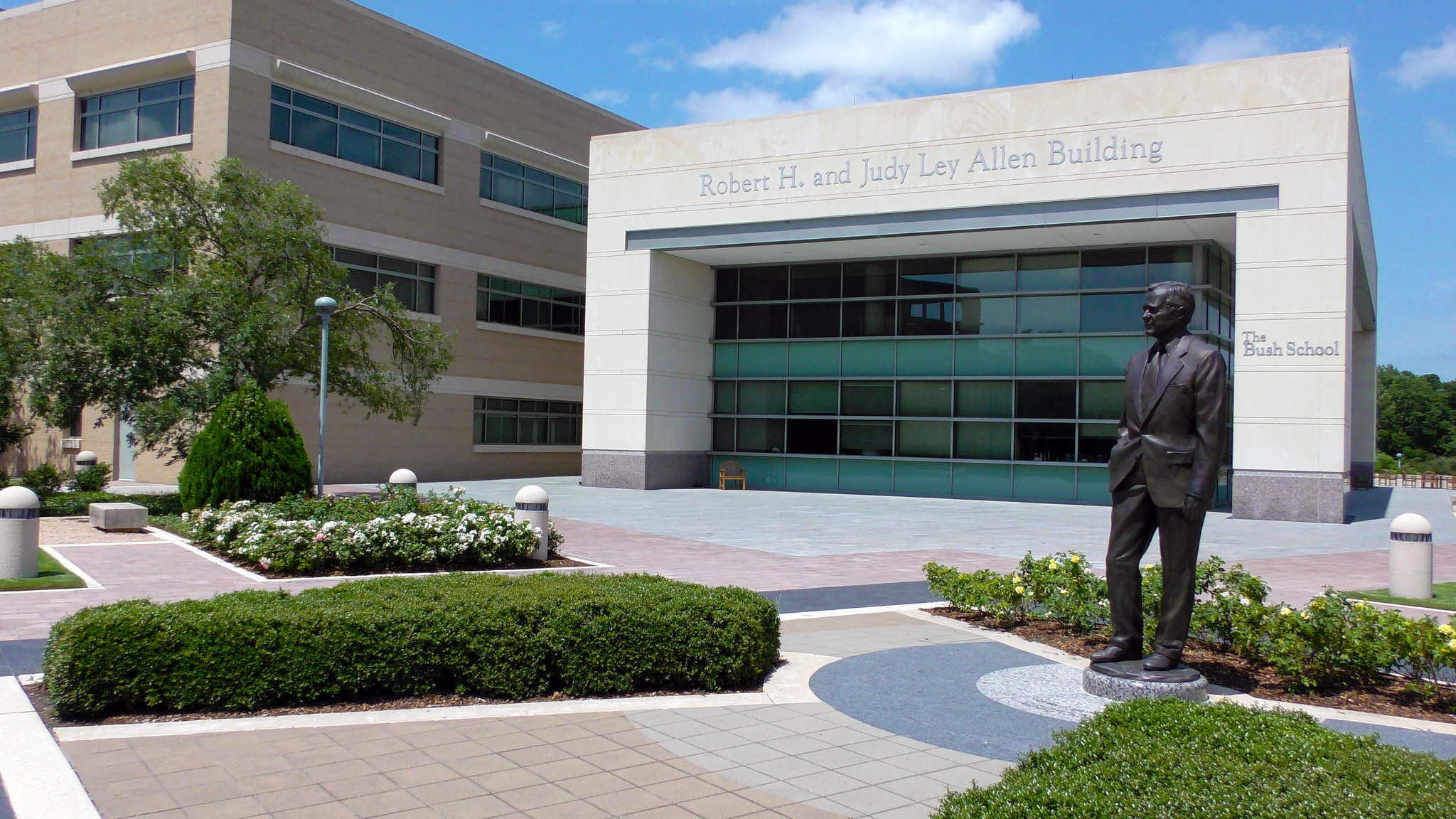
- George H.W. Bush Statue
- Motto: Inspiring excellence in the noble calling of public service
- Type: Public
- Established: 1997 (29 years ago)
- Parent institution: Texas A&M University
- Affiliations: APSIA; NASPAA
- Dean: John B. Sherman
- Location: College Station, Texas; Washington DC
- Website: bush.tamu.edu
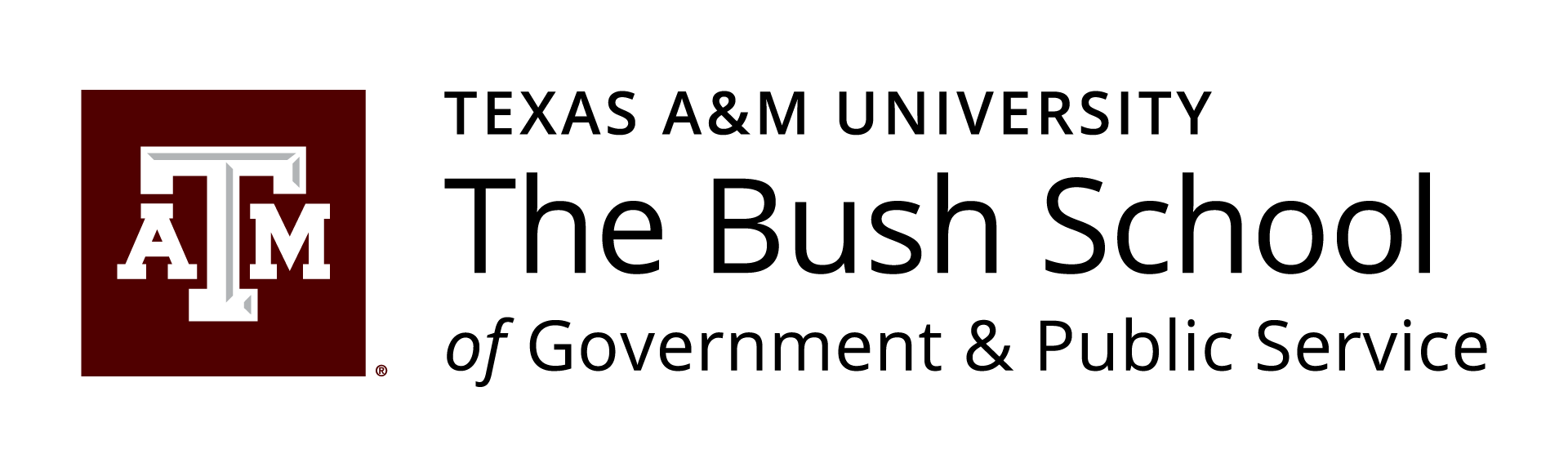

The Bush School of Government and Public Service is the public policy school of Texas A&M University founded in 1997.

The Bush School is located in the Robert H. '50 and Judy Ley Allen Building adjacent to the George Bush Presidential Library on the West Campus of Texas A&M University. The George Bush Presidential Library opened its doors in 1997 on 90 acres (36 ha; 0.14 sq mi) of land donated by Texas A&M at the western edge of the campus. In 1995, Dr. Charles F. Hermann was hired as the Founding Director to build the Bush School; the first students started taking classes in Fall 1997. The school was initially a department inside the College of Liberal Arts but became an independent college within Texas A&M University in 2000.

The Bush School was named in honor of former United States president George H. W. Bush. He was involved in providing direction in the organization by helping bring noted professors and other individuals from the public and private sec to the campus. Visitors have included Ban Ki-moon, Mikhail Gorbachev, Ted Kennedy, Barack Obama, Arnold Schwarzenegger, Helmut Kohl, Peter Orszag, Mitt Romney, Mike Krzyzewski, Dick Cheney, Colin Powell, Condoleezza Rice, Karl Rove, Andrew Card, Dan Quayle, Antonin Scalia, Ryan Crocker, Michael Mullen, Sean Hannity, Jeb Bush, Jiang Zemin, John Major, and François Hollande.

The Robertson Foundation selected the Bush School for the prestigious Robertson Fellowship Scholarship, a full-ride scholarship for students dedicated to government service.

== Academic programs ==
=== Overview ===
The Bush School offers four graduate programs for students aspiring to careers in public service: Public Service and Administration, International Affairs, and International Policy, as well as an online Executive Public Service and Administration. The Bush School also offers graduate certificates in Advanced International Affairs, Homeland Security, Nonprofit Management, Public Management, Geospatial Intelligence, and Cybersecurity Policy. The Bush School has joined with several Texas A&M departments to offer seven Bachelor's/Master's 5-Year (3+2) Programs that allow students to enter the Bush School at the beginning of their fourth year and receive both their undergraduate and master's degrees in five years.

At the undergraduate level, the Department of Political Science offers a Bachelor's in Political Science (B.A./B.S.) with courses in all facets of the discipline: American Politics, International Relations, Comparative Politics, Political Theory, Political Methodology, Public Administration, and Policy, and Race and Ethnic Politics. The Bachelor's in International Studies degree (B.A.) is a new addition to the International Affairs Department, offering undergraduate students a fundamental understanding of foreign relations with the International Politics and Diplomacy track option.

At the doctoral level, the PhD in Political Science program emphasizes theoretical and methodological rigor and is designed to train applied social scientists for research careers. Major fields of study mirror the disciplinary norm: American Politics, Comparative Politics, International Relations, Political Theory, and Public Administration/Public Policy. In 2022, the Political Science PhD program was ranked No. 14 in the world in Shanghai Rankings and was ranked No. 28 overall and No. 21 in American Politics in U.S. News & World Report.

=== International Affairs ===
The Department of International Affairs combines theoretical and practical instruction in the fields of international relations, international economics, security, international development, intelligence, diplomacy, and regional studies.

==== Undergraduate programs ====
The Bachelor's in International Studies (B.A.), International Politics and Diplomacy track is an interdisciplinary degree. The International Politics and Diplomacy track offers students a fundamental understanding of foreign relations. Students learn about the workings of governments and civil societies in a global framework.

==== Graduate programs ====
===== Master of International Affairs =====
The Master of International Affairs (MIA) contains tracks of study in either International Development and Economic policy (IDEP) or National Security and Diplomacy (NSD), with several options for concentrations within each track. Study abroad courses, language immersion, and leadership and exchange programs supplement the curriculum.

===== Master of International Policy =====
The department also offers the Master of International Policy, a one-year program for students who have had at least six years of practical experience in the field of international affairs.

===== Combined programs =====
The Bush School of Government and Public Service and Texas A&M University's Departments of Economics and International Studies (in the politics/diplomacy track) offer two joint-degree programs that allow qualified majors to enter the Bush School at the beginning of their fourth year of study at Texas A&M University. The two joint-degree programs offered by the Department of International Affairs are the following:

- Economics – MIA
- International Studies – MIA

==== Joint degree programs ====
The Bush School and the School of Public Health combined to offer students the ability to receive both a Master of International Affairs degree and a Master of Public Health degree in a three-year period. Students can pursue one of two majors within the School of Public Health as part of this combined degree program: Master of Public Health in Health Policy and Management and Master of Public Health in Health Promotion and Community Health Science.

=== Political Science ===
The Department of Political Science offers a Bachelor's in Political Science (BA or BS) as well as a doctorate in political science.

==== Undergraduate programs ====
At the undergraduate level, the Department of Political Science offers a Bachelor's in Political Science (BA or BS) with courses in all facets of the discipline: American Politics, International Relations, Comparative Politics, Political Theory, Political Methodology, Public Administration, and Policy, and Race and Ethnic Politics. The department also participates actively in the university honors program. Honors courses are available in all areas of political science. In addition, students may graduate with honors distinction in political science.

==== Doctoral program ====
The Department of Political Science offers graduate study leading to the degree of the Doctor of Philosophy (PhD). The PhD in Political Science is appropriate for those who wish to pursue careers as research scholars in institutions of higher education. Students typically choose a Major from among the following sub-fields: American Politics, Comparative Politics, International Relations, Political Theory, and Public Policy/Public Administration.

==== Combined programs ====
The Department of Political Science joined the Department of Public Service & Administration to offer a combined degree program that allows qualified majors to enter the MPSA program at the beginning of their fourth year of study at Texas A&M University. The five joint-degree programs offered by the Department of Political Science are the following:

- Political Science – MPSA

=== Public Service & Administration ===
The Department of Public Service & Administration offers two master's degree options as well as joint and collaborative degree programs with other Texas A&M University schools and colleges.

==== Graduate Program ====
The Master of Public Service & Administration degree provides students with general knowledge and analytical skills in management, leadership, policy analysis, and research methods, with tracks in Nonprofit Management, Public Management, and Public Policy Analysis. Students can choose from a number of concentrations to focus their studies, including analytical methods; cybersecurity policy; education policy and management; energy, environment, and technology policy and management; health policy and management; international nongovernmental organizations, security policy and management; state and local government policy and management; and individually designed concentrations. MPSA students are also required to engage in public service through interaction with high-level public leaders, real-world consulting projects, student organizations, and the School's Public Service Leadership Program.

==== Executive Program ====
The Executive Master of Public Service & Administration (EMPSA) is aimed at allowing mid-career professionals to pursue their full-time professional careers while earning their degrees. EMPSA students select a track area of Homeland Security, Nonprofit Management, or Public Management, culminating in a final, required capstone project.

==== Combined programs ====
The Department of Public Service and Administration joined with Texas A&M University's Departments of Political Science, Economics, Agricultural Economics, Sociology, and Wildlife and Fisheries Sciences to offer joint-degree programs that allow qualified majors to enter the MPSA program at the beginning of their fourth year of study at Texas A&M University. The five joint-degree programs offered by the Department of Public Service and Administration are the following:

- Economics – MPSA
- Political Science – MPSA
- Sociology – MPSA
- Agricultural Economics – MPSA
- Wildlife and Fisheries Sciences – MPSA

==== Joint degree programs ====
The PSAA and EAHR Collaborative Degrees Program (CDP) is a collaboration of the Bush School and the College of Education and Human Development designed for those individuals who intend to build an academic career focused on conducting research in the multidisciplinary field of education policy. This academic program will prepare individuals for careers in research universities and teaching colleges as well as for careers in consultancies or educational agencies of all types (private, non-profit, local, state, federal or international). Students who successfully complete all program requirements receive both a Master of Public Service and Administration (MPSA) degree from the Bush School of Government and Public Service and a Doctor of Philosophy in Educational Administration (PhD) from the Department of Educational Administration and Human Resource Development, in the College of Education and Human Development.

The Bush School also offers a PSAA and HPM Collaborative Degree Program (CDP) designed to prepare individuals for careers in research universities and teaching colleges as well as for careers in consultancies or research agencies. Students who successfully complete all program requirements will receive both a Master of Public Service and Administration (MPSA) degree from the Bush School of Government and Public Service and a Doctor of Philosophy in Health Services Research (Ph.D.) from the Department of Health Policy and Management in the School of Public Health.

=== Graduate certificates ===
The Bush School offers graduate certificate programs online, in-residence, or in a combined format. Certificate programs include the Certificate in Advanced International Affairs, Certificate in Homeland Security, Certificate in Nonprofit Management, Certificate in Public Management, Certificate in National Security Affairs, and Certificate in Cybersecurity Policy. The Bush School partnered with the College of Geosciences to offer the joint Certificate in Geospatial Intelligence.

=== Bush School Online ===
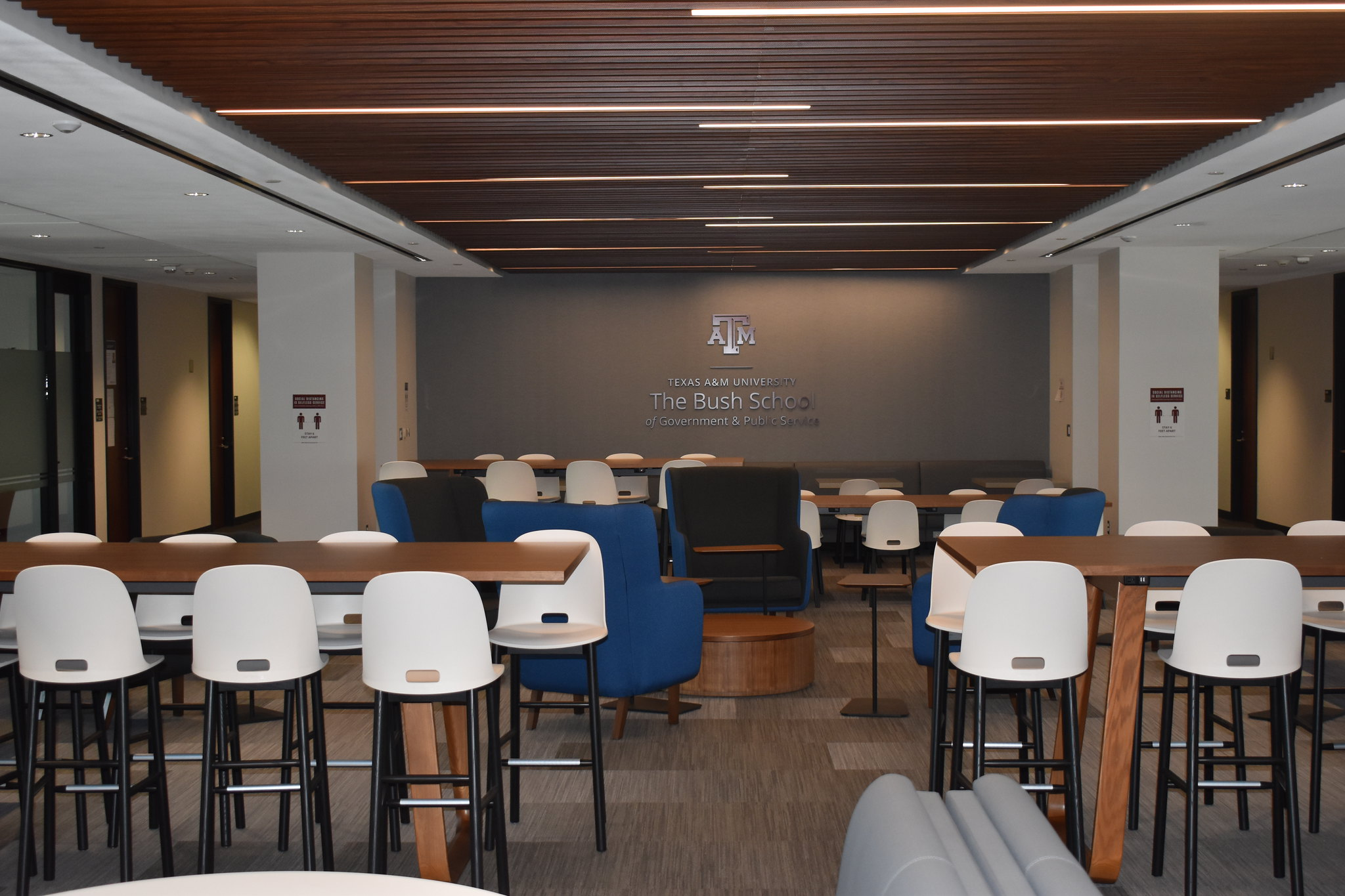
Student Learning Center at the Bush School where students gather to study and work on projects

The Bush School offers educational opportunities to students and working professionals in various fields of state, local, and federal government; international affairs; law enforcement; military; homeland security; nonprofit; the private sector; and more. The Online Executive Master of Public Service and Administration and the online graduate Certificates in Advanced International Affairs, Homeland Security, Nonprofit Management, Public Management, and Geospatial Intelligence provide alternative options for professionals wishing to pursue graduate studies concurrent with their career obligations.

== Research ==
=== Institutes ===
==== Institute for Science, Technology & Public Policy ====
The Institute for Science, Technology and Public Policy (ISTPP) was created by the Board of Regents in the fall of 2000 to fill a gap between science and technology research and public policy research. ISTPP takes the position that for known social and environmental problems, science and technology may help find solutions. ISTPP's policy research aims to identify the public and stakeholders' acceptability parameters for science and technology applications. ISTPP also provides interdisciplinary research experience for doctoral, master's, and undergraduate students to augment their training as future decision and policy-makers and university faculty. Graduate students may also work with scholars as coauthors on manuscripts for publication in peer-reviewed journals. The current director of the ISTPP is Arnold Vedlitz.

==== Scowcroft Institute of International Affairs ====
The Scowcroft Institute of International Affairs was established in 2007 and named in honor of Brent Scowcroft, retired US Air Force Lieutenant General and National Security Advisor for Presidents Gerald Ford and George H. W. Bush. The Institute focuses on assessing, addressing, and presenting policy-oriented research on international affairs. It supports the School through hosting educational conferences and providing opportunities for researchers to access the Bush Library. The current director of the Scowcroft Institute is John Hennessey-Niland, former United States ambassador to Palau.

==== Mosbacher Institute for Trade, Economics, & Public Policy ====
The Mosbacher Institute for Trade, Economics, and Public Policy was established in October 2009 in honor of Robert Mosbacher, who served as the US Secretary of Commerce during George H. W. Bush's presidency. The organization performs research to offer solutions to policy and economic challenges prevalent both domestically and throughout the world. The current director of the Mosbacher Institute is Dr. Raymond Robertson.

=== Centers ===
==== The European Union Center ====
The European Union Center is to support scholarly investigations of public policy in a European context. Capitalizing on academic expertise within Texas A&M University, the center also supports the development of interdisciplinary relationships with a focus on Europe by promoting a better understanding of the policies and issues that influence the transatlantic relationship.

==== The Center for Nonprofits & Philanthropy ====
The Center for Nonprofits & Philanthropy (CNP) focuses on outreach, education, and research on the effective management of nonprofit organizations. Its outreach activities include partnerships with Bank of America, United Way of the Brazos Valley, and the Cities of Bryan and College Station to operate programs on volunteerism and leadership in public service. The center offers a variety of workshops, seminars, and conferences, as well as three certificate opportunities: the Certificate in Nonprofit Management, Certificate in Nonprofit Leadership, and Certificate in Social Justice Leadership (launched in fall 2021). Dr. William A. Brown directs the center.

==== The Albritton Center for Grand Strategy ====
The Albritton Center for Grand Strategy (CGS) defines it as its primary mission to assess the first principles behind American grand strategy. The Center adopts a critical approach to grand strategy, taking the view that the United States should seek alternatives to global primacy. The center offers opportunities for Bush School students to study and publish on grand strategy and is affiliated with the John Quincy Adams Society. Dr. Jasen Castillo and Dr. John Schuessler codirect the Albritton Center.

=== Programs ===
==== Intelligence Studies ====
When the Bush School of Government & Public Service was established in 1997, President George H.W. Bush strongly desired a concentration in intelligence studies as part of the curriculum. Professor James Olson has used his lengthy career as a CIA undercover operative to teach intelligence. Student interest has been strong, and over 300 graduates have successfully completed the program. Today, the program is considered a top school for U.S. intelligence agencies and maintains practitioner expertise from the CIA, FBI, NSA, and U.S. military. Greg Vogle, former Deputy Director for Operations at the CIA, serves as Director of the Intelligence Studies Program.

All students in the Master of International Affairs degree program are required to complete at least two concentrations as part of their degree requirements. The Intelligence as an Instrument of Statecraft concentration consists of three courses chosen from an offering of intelligence-related courses.

==== Women, Peace & Security ====
The Program on Women, Peace, & Security (WPS) was established in November 2015 within the Department of International Affairs at the Bush School, with Professor Valerie M. Hudson serving as its first director. Its purpose is to provide a WPS node in the heartland of the United States, and its mission is three-fold: teaching, research, and outreach. The Program's inaugural funding is provided by the Compton Foundation; and its research arm, The WomanStats Project, is currently funded by the US Department of Defense.

==== Middle East ====
The Bush School's Middle East Program prepares students in the Master of International Affairs and Master of International Policy degree programs for professional careers in government and the nongovernmental sector that require an in-depth knowledge of the Middle East. Four full-time faculty members in the Department of International Affairs offer a range of courses on the region, exploring the domestic politics of regional states, religion and politics, regional political economy, post-conflict reconstruction and development, the international politics of the region, and American policy toward it.

All students in the Master of International Affairs degree program are required to complete at least two concentrations as part of their degree requirements. The Middle East concentration consists of three courses on the region.

==== Cyber Policy, Strategy, & Security ====
The Bush School's Cyber Policy, Strategy, & Security Program was established in 2018 in response to student demand and growth in the professional opportunities available to Bush School graduates in cyber policy and cybersecurity. It is headed by Professor of Practice Gary D. Brown. The Program prepares students in the Master of International Affairs and Master of International Policy degree programs for professional careers in government and the nongovernmental sector in the cyber arena.

All students in the Master of International Affairs degree program are required to complete at least two concentrations as part of their degree requirements. The Cyber Policy concentration consists of three courses chosen from a list of approved courses.

==== Economic Statecraft ====
The Bush School's Economic Statecraft Program (ESP) is a national center of excellence for the study of economics and security that serves as a magnetic pole for bringing together and stimulating a growing body of scholarship on the topic of economic statecraft. The Economic Statecraft Program is a novel effort that seeks to analyze economic statecraft, bring together academics across the world, and serve as a linkage between policymakers and academia. It is led by Dr. William J. Norris, an associate professor at the Bush School, who also directs the China Studies concentration.

== Robert H. '50 and Judy Ley Allen Building ==
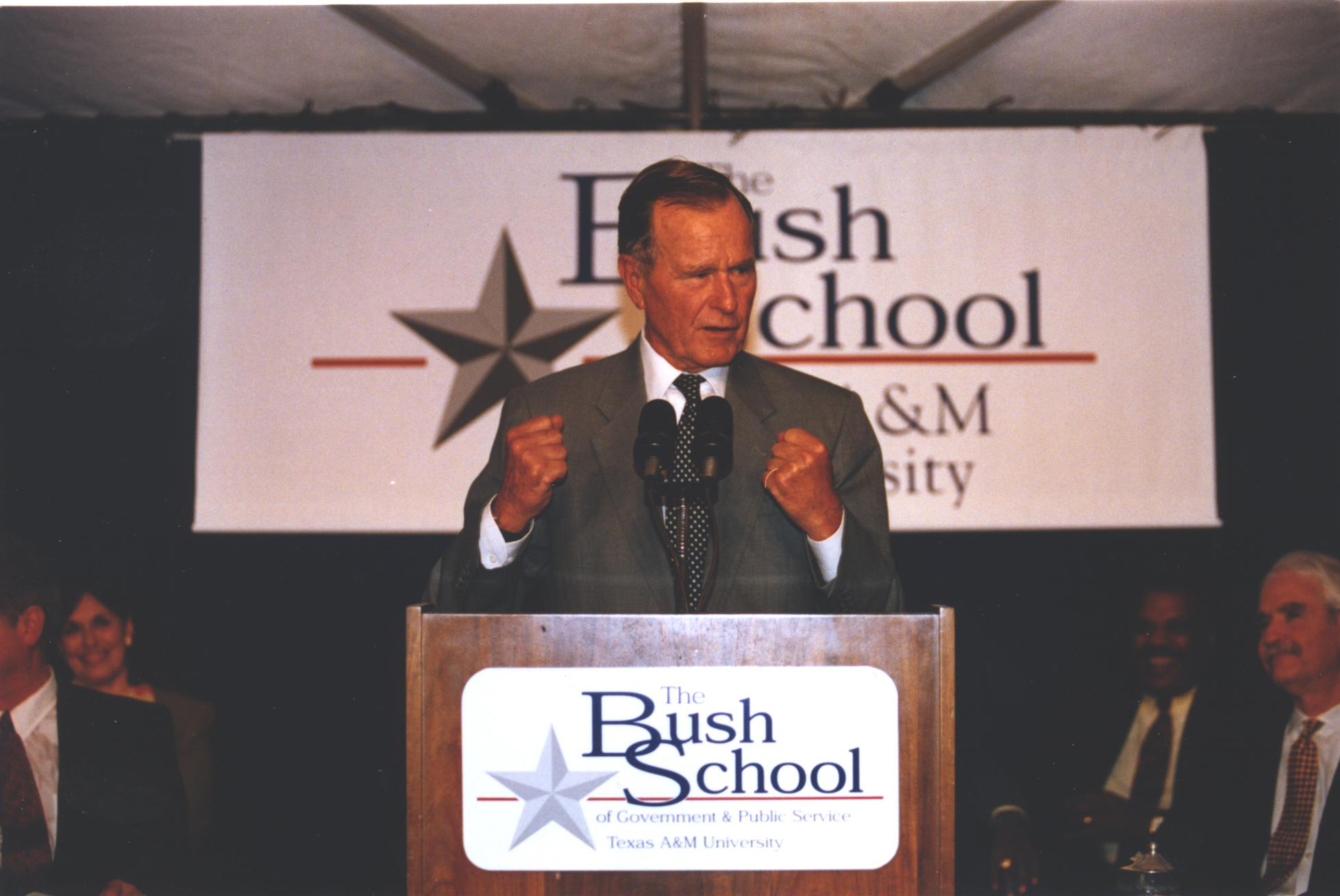
President Bush at the dedication of the George Bush Presidential Library and Museum Complex.

The Academic Building-West was dedicated alongside the George Bush Presidential Library and Museum, Presidential Conference Center, Department of Political Science, Department of Economics, and International Center in 1997, representing a total investment of $82,682,000. In 2002, the building was christened the Robert H. ’50 and Judy Ley Allen Building.

During the spring 2020 semester, the Allen Building underwent an extensive remodeling project on the first and second floors of the building.

== Washington DC Teaching Site ==
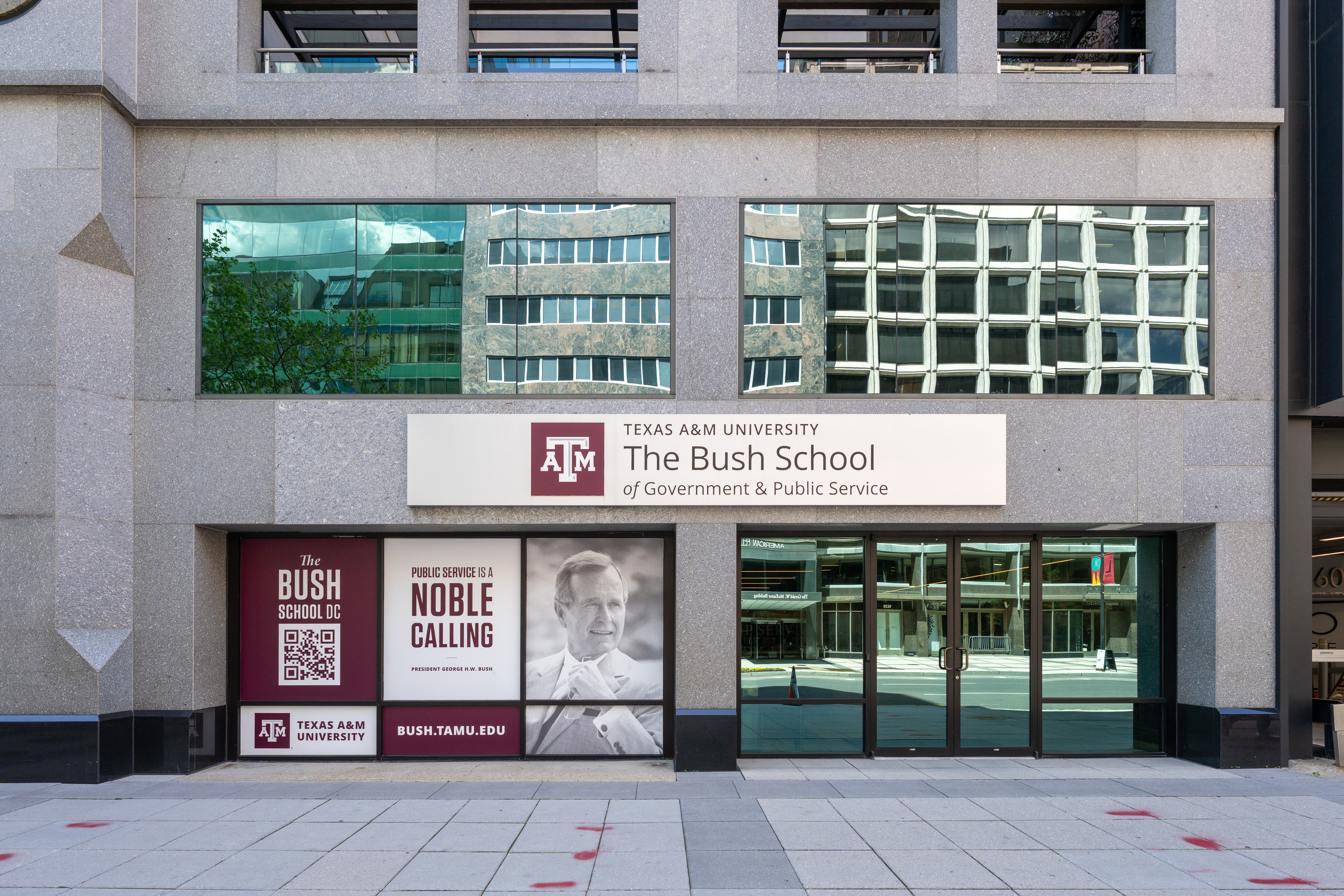
Campus in Washington, D.C.

On May 4, 2020, the Bush School announced plans to open a new teaching site based in Washington, DC.

Bush School Dean Mark Welsh announced the appointment of Jay B. Silveria as the executive director of the Bush School Washington, DC, Teaching Site on Sept. 24, 2020.

In January 2021, the Bush School DC hosted its first classes in the Master of International Policy (MIP) program. The MIP is aimed toward individuals who have already begun their careers in the fields of international affairs and national security. Students admitted to the program have at least four years of professional experience in those fields, broadly understood. The degree is offered in residence at the Bush School DC with an option of taking up to 6 credit hours online.

In addition, the Bush School DC offers a Master of National Security and Intelligence (NSI). Designed for early-career professionals with a desire to prepare themselves for a career in the Intelligence Community, the degree is offered in residence with the option of taking up to 6 credit hours online. The Bush School DC also offers a Certificate in Advanced International Affairs (CAIA).

Bush School DC also offers a graduate certificate in Advanced International Affairs (CAIA). The CAIA is an outstanding addition to the resume of anyone interested in a career in international relations, intelligence, defense policy, military affairs, counterterrorism, diplomacy, international organizations, law enforcement, international business, or international economic development.

The Bush School DC's 47,000-square foot facility is located in downtown DC, three blocks from the White House.

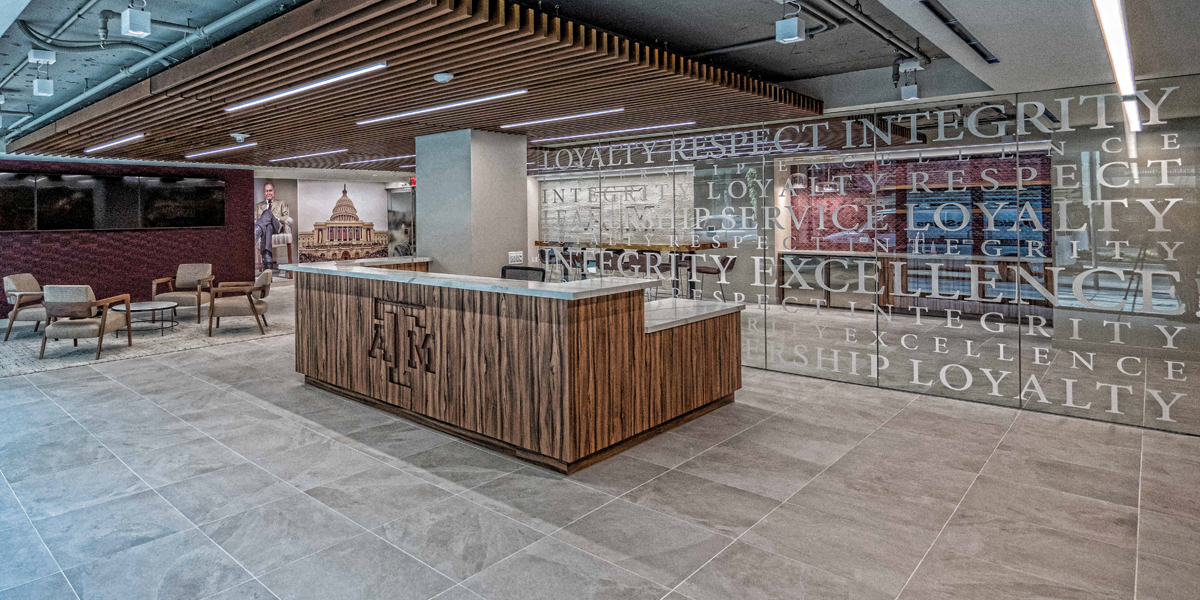
Lobby area at the Bush School DC Teaching Site.

== Professional Organizations ==
- American Society for Public Administration (ASPA)
- National Association of Schools of Public Affairs and Administration (NASPAA)
- Pi Alpha Alpha
- Association of Fundraising Professionals (AFP) — Collegiate Chapter

== Student organizations ==
- MSC Student Conference on National Affairs
- Student Government Association
- Public Service Organization
- Bushwhacker Athletics
- Foreign Language & Culture Society
- Alexander Hamilton Society
- John Quincy Adams Society
- Ambassadors Council
- CGS Student Affiliates Program

== Professional development ==
=== Medal of Excellence ===
Earning the Medal of Excellence requires students to complete the Leadership Certificate and prepare a reflective learning ePortfolio, which documents what the student has learned throughout his or her degree program. Students have two years to complete the requirements for the Medal, and they submit their work for final review at the end of their second year. Students earning the Medal of Excellence receive two awards at a ceremony held in the spring of the year they graduate:

- a medal that includes their name, program, and graduate year on the back and
- a certificate presented by the dean.

=== Public Service Leadership Program ===
In 2007, the dean instituted a formal Certificate in Leadership. Earning a Dean's Certificate requires formal education and training (coursework and program workshops), self-study and assessments (personalized feedback and individualized leadership development planning), and experiential learning activities (involvement in extracurricular organizations, events, and service projects).

== Deans ==
- Charles F. Hermann, 1995–1999 (founding director)
- Robert M. Gates, 1999–2001 (interim)
- Richard Chilcoat, 2001–2008
- Arthur Benton Cocanougher, 2009 (interim dean)
- Ryan Crocker, 2010–2016 (In 2011, Crocker went on extended leave due to his appointment as United States Ambassador to Afghanistan; he returned in 2013.)
- Andrew Card, 2011–2013 (acting dean)
- Mark Welsh, 2016–2023
- Frank B. Ashley III, 2023–2024 (interim dean)
- John B. Sherman, 2024–present

== Accreditation ==
- The Master of Public Service and Administration program is accredited by the National Association of Schools of Public Affairs and Administration.
- The Master of International Affairs program is one of thirty-nine full members of the Association of Professional Schools of International Affairs.

== Rankings ==
- Top 10% (28th overall) in Public Affairs Programs, U.S. News & World Report, 2023–2024
- 1st in the nation for best value for residential MPA, Value Colleges, 2021
- 1st in the nation for best value for executive online MPA, Value Colleges, 2021
- 5th among public universities and 26th in the nation for its International Affairs program, Foreign Policy, 2018
- 6th among public universities and 6th in the nation for its Homeland Security program, U.S. News & World Report, 2024
- 7th in the world for Public Administration Research, Shanghai Ranking, 2021
- 9th among public universities in American Politics and 11th among public universities overall for its PhD in Political Science program, U.S. News & World Report, 2024.
- 14th in the world for its PhD in Political Science program, ShanghaiRanking, 2022.
- 15th among public universities for its Public Affairs program, U.S. News & World Report, 2024
- 19th among public universities and 18th in the nation for its Nonprofit Management program, U.S. News & World Report, 2024
- 21st among public universities for its Public Policy Analysis program, U.S. News & World Report, 2024
