= Mayo A. Shattuck III =

American businessman

- Born: 1954 (age 71–72); Boston, Massachusetts, U.S.
- Education: Williams College
- Board member of: Gap Inc.; Johns Hopkins Medicine; Capital One; Hut 8

Mayo A. Shattuck III (born 1954) is an American businessman. He is chairman of Gap Inc., board member of Capital One Financial and HUT8, and chairman of Johns Hopkins Medical and Johns Hopkins Health System. He was non-executive chairman of Chicago-based Exelon Corporation from 2012 to 2022. Shattuck is involved in a number of philanthropic efforts, including those at the Johns Hopkins University, First Tee, and the University of Maryland Baltimore County and is an advocate for nuclear power.

== Early life and education ==
Shattuck was born in Boston, Massachusetts, in 1954. He attended the Noble and Greenough School in Dedham, Massachusetts. Shattuck received a Bachelor of Arts from Williams College in 1976 and an MBA from Stanford University in 1980. Shattuck graduated as an Arjay Miller Scholar from Stanford Graduate School of Business.

Shattuck's father was "heavily involved in the Boston investment community", and he managed Harvard's endowment and was a managing director at one of Boston's most respected institutional money managers. Shattuck's father died in 1974.

== Career ==
After completing his MBA at Stanford in 1980, Shattuck joined Bain and Co. in San Francisco where he worked with former Massachusetts governor and presidential candidate Mitt Romney. He also held a position at Morgan Guaranty Trust Co.

=== Alex. Brown & Sons ===
In 1985, Shattuck joined the investment firm Alex. Brown & Sons and was soon after promoted to president and chief operating officer in 1991. There he helped the company move through several challenging mergers and the eventual acquisition of the company by Deutsche Bank. Howard Schultz, chairman and chief executive of Starbucks Coffee, called Shattuck a "brilliant strategist", referring to his time at Alex. Brown. In 1997, Shattuck helped engineer the $1.7 billion merger of Alex. Brown and Sons and Bankers Trust resulting in him becoming a vice chairman of Bankers Trust Corp. and the co-chief executive officer of BT Alex. Brown. During this process, Shattuck was known for advocating on behalf of workers at Alex. Brown and was mediator between the executives of the two companies. The new company was acquired by Deutsche Bank two years later, and Shattuck was chairman of the board of Deutsche Bank Alex. Brown. Shattuck also was the head of Investment Banking and Private Banking. Shattuck resigned on September 12, 2001 as head of Deutsche Bank Alex. Brown.

=== Constellation Energy Group ===
On October 26, 2001, Shattuck was appointed president and CEO of Constellation Energy Group, and he was elected chairman of the board in July 2002. Shattuck's early tenure at Constellation was characterized by the objective of refocusing the company on the energy sector by taking actions such as laying off 10% of the company's workers and selling off the company's Boeing 747, transport tanker, real estate assets, and nursing home business. Over the same period, he reversed an existing plan to divide the company with the assistance of Goldman Sachs and restructured the company to force more accountability to management. In response to worsening conditions for American energy companies, Shattuck aimed to refinance Constellation's $5 billion debt load and secure more credit from banks allowing the acquisition of various weaker energy companies going into bankruptcy. Shattuck's decisions were widely considered to be painful at first, but ultimately necessary to turn around and grow Constellation.

In the next few years, Shattuck expanded Constellation's operations in the financial sector, staking out large positions in energy commodity markets and complex derivative products financed by large, short-term loans. For instance, Shattuck led Constellation's activities in buying power from utility companies and reselling power to customers around the country in deregulated markets resulting in significant growth. In expanding Constellation's energy trading activities, Shattuck predicted that only energy companies, and not financial firms, could create a market for energy derivatives and risk management in the energy industry. While these operations contributed greatly to Constellation's profits over the period, they also increased the company's exposure to financial market developments. When credit ultimately dried up during the 2008 financial crisis, ratings agencies downgraded Constellation's debt and Constellation stock fell by 76% leading some to question whether Shattuck should continue to lead the company.

Nonetheless, general sentiment on Constellation's board was "overwhelmingly" to keep him citing his "imperturbability" amid chaos. Over the following few years, Shattuck steered the company through the global financial downturn, securing funding from Berkshire Hathaway to keep the company afloat while avoiding a buyout from the same company, preserving the independence of Constellation. Finally in April 2011, Exelon corporation announced plans to acquire Constellation Energy. The planned merger drew negative reactions from some but was ultimately approved by regulators and completed in March 2012. After Exelon completed its acquisition of Constellation Energy, Shattuck assumed the new role of executive chairman. Shattuck retired from Exelon on February 28, 2013 but remained on the board as non-executive chairman. As a non-executive chairman less is required of Shattuck, allowing him to shift his focus from many of the daily tasks associated with leading the company. Shattuck helped engineer the successful spin off of Constellation Energy from its parent, Exelon, in 2022 before his retirement as chairman that year.

== Advocacy ==
Spending much of his career in the energy industry after leaving Alex. Brown & Sons, much of Shattuck's advocacy centers around topics dealing with the future of electrical energy in the United States.

One such major point of advocacy has been the deregulation of energy markets across the United States. While prior to the 1990s energy was largely distributed by government regulated monopolies, legislation in various states eventually led to competition between energy companies, thus forcing significant change in how energy companies distributed electricity. In 2010, Shattuck spoke before the US Chamber of Commerce:

"We have markets now where the important thing is that people have choice...Twenty-two states have broken up their regulated utilities to permit competition, he said, and costs have come down. "Deregulated markets do what they are supposed to do...Monopolies are not going to be the answer in terms of driving efficiencies, driving costs down and driving innovation"

Additionally, in contrast to many of his peers in the energy industry, Shattuck has been vocal in his support for a carbon tax stating,

"We ought to address climate change, and address it through a price on carbon"

In 2009, Shattuck released a statement on behalf of Constellation Energy backing a bill named the American Clean energy Security Act of 2009 which limited carbon emissions and promoted green energy generation. Lastly and most notably, Shattuck is an outspoken advocate for American nuclear energy. In particular, Shattuck argues for additional sovereign support in the form of extension of government loan guarantees in the construction of nuclear reactors. Speaking to a Johns Hopkins audience, he stated that

"if that upfront fee is really big, it's going to discourage people from wanting to take the loan, because there's so much money going out for a plant of that size. It is a process that we're in to get all parties to get their arms around the gap analysis"

During his time at Constellation Energy and Exelon, Shattuck was chairman of the Institute of Nuclear Power Operations and a member of the Executive Committee of the Nuclear Energy Institute and Co-Chairman of the Commission on Nuclear Policy in the United States. After withdrawing from a joint project with EDF to operate nuclear plants in the United States, Shattuck continues to advocate for nuclear energy.

== Controversy ==
Maryland began to deregulate electricity in the early 2000s (prior to Shattuck's tenure at Constellation) which would ultimately lift the state's electricity rate price caps. This development coincided with large hurricanes in the southeastern United States reducing natural gas production in 2007. All of this resulted in Baltimore Gas and Electric Company, a regulated utility company subsidiary of Constellation Energy Group, having to raise electricity rates by 72%. Opponents argued that increased revenues from Constellation profits should be used to subsidize utility prices and keep them low. Shattuck himself was scrutinized for contributing $8,000 in the Maryland gubernatorial election. On the other hand, defenders point out that BG&E is legally separated from Constellation and is heavily regulated by the state's Public Service Commission to keep levels of profitability in check. The Maryland General Assembly ultimately put up a temporary measure to limit price increases to 15%.

== Other affiliations ==
Shattuck is an independent director at several corporations including:

- Capital One
- Gap

Previously, he was independent director of Alarm.com and as co-chairman of the Center for Strategic and International Studies Commission on Nuclear Policy in the United States.

== Philanthropy ==
During and after his tenure as the head of Alex. Brown & Sons, Shattuck was the president of the Alex. Brown & Sons Charitable Foundation. Alongside seven other trustees, Shattuck managed the endowment and gave donations to institutions in the Baltimore area. Notable among these activities were million dollar grants given to the Baltimore Museum of Art, the Baltimore Zoo, and Johns Hopkins Hospital (alongside other similar Baltimore institutions).

Since joining Constellation Energy in 2001, Shattuck focused much of his philanthropy on Johns Hopkins University (JHU). In 2004, he was elected to the board of trustees of Johns Hopkins Medicine. In 2007, he donated $1 million to a new burn unit in the Children's Center at the Johns Hopkins University Hospital. Resulting from this donation, the hospital constructed The Shattuck Family Pediatric Burn Unit, which consists of 205 private treatment rooms. In addition to the rooms for patient care, the burn unit will include facilities used for education of students, fellows, and residents at The Johns Hopkins Hospital. Previously, he was co-chair of the $6 Billion dollar JHU Capital Campaign. Shattuck has played a large part in leading this effort to raise funds from donors to support the academic mission of the Johns Hopkins University, especially through the "Rising to the Challenge" campaign.

Outside of Johns Hopkins, Shattuck is also a trustee of First Tee, an organization focused on bringing "affordable junior golf programs to communities that do not have them, especially in economically disadvantaged areas."

He also established the Shattuck family internship at University of Maryland Baltimore County. This internship provides support and education to students interested in entrepreneurship and business leadership.

== Personal life ==
Shattuck has 5 children. He was formerly married to Molly Shattuck.
