= Emmett Paige Jr. =

American Army general and Defense official

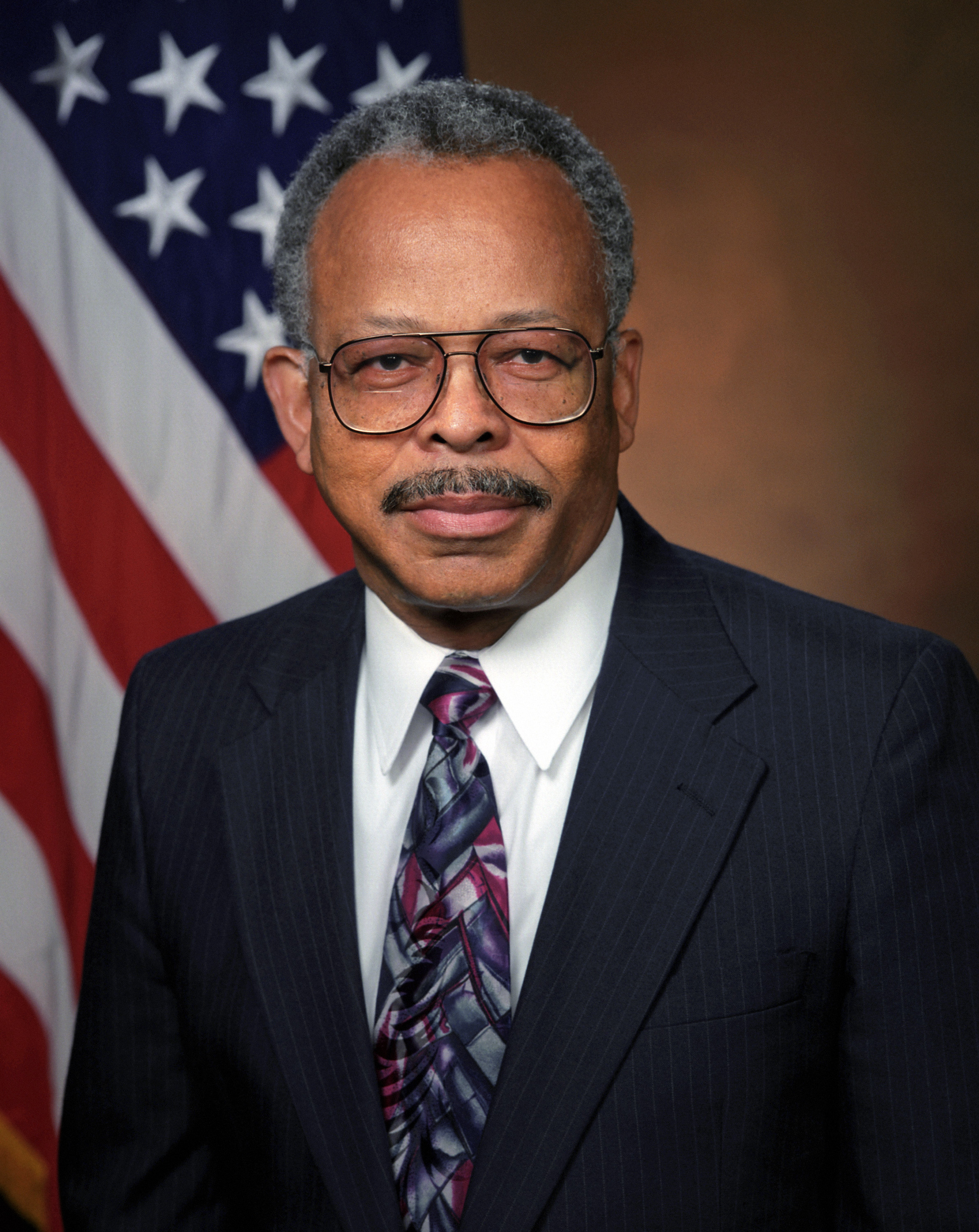

Assistant Secretary of Defense for Command, Control, Communications and Intelligence
- In office 10 June 1993 – 23 May 1997
- President: Bill Clinton
- Preceded by: Duane P. Andrews
- Succeeded by: Arthur L. Money

Personal details
- Born: 20 February 1931 Jacksonville, Florida
- Died: 31 August 2017 (aged 86) Fort Washington, Maryland
- Education: University of Maryland University College (BA); Pennsylvania State University (MA)

Military service
- Allegiance: United States
- Branch/service: United States Army
- Years of service: 1947–1988
- Rank: Lieutenant General
- Commands: Army Information Systems Command; Army Electronics Research and Development Command; Army Communications Research and Development Command; 11th Signal Group; 361st Signal Battalion
- Battles/wars: Vietnam War
- Awards: Distinguished Service Medal (2); Legion of Merit (3); Bronze Star Medal; Meritorious Service Medal

Emmett Paige Jr. (20 February 1931 – 31 August 2017) served as the United States Assistant Secretary of Defense for Command, Control, Communications and Intelligence from 1993 to 1997. He retired from active duty in the United States Army as a lieutenant general in 1988 after 41 years of military service.

== Early life and education ==
Born in Jacksonville, Florida, Paige dropped out of Stanton High School and joined the U.S. Army in August 1947 at the age of sixteen. He graduated from Signal Corps Officer Candidate School in July 1952 and was commissioned as a second lieutenant. Paige later earned a B.A. degree in general studies from the University of Maryland University College in 1972 and an M.A. degree in public administration from Pennsylvania State University in 1974. He also attended the Army Command and General Staff College and graduated from the Army War College.

== Career ==
Paige commanded the 361st Signal Battalion in Vietnam and the 11th Signal Group based at Fort Huachuca in Arizona.

Promoted to brigadier general in 1976, Paige concurrently served as director of the Army Communications-Electronics Engineering and Installation Agency at Fort Huachuca and the Army Communications Systems Agency at Fort Monmouth in New Jersey.

Promoted to major general in 1979, Paige was appointed commanding general of the Army Communications Research and Development Command at Fort Monmouth. In 1981, he was appointed commanding general of the Army Electronics Research and Development Command at the Harry Diamond Laboratories in Adelphi, Maryland.

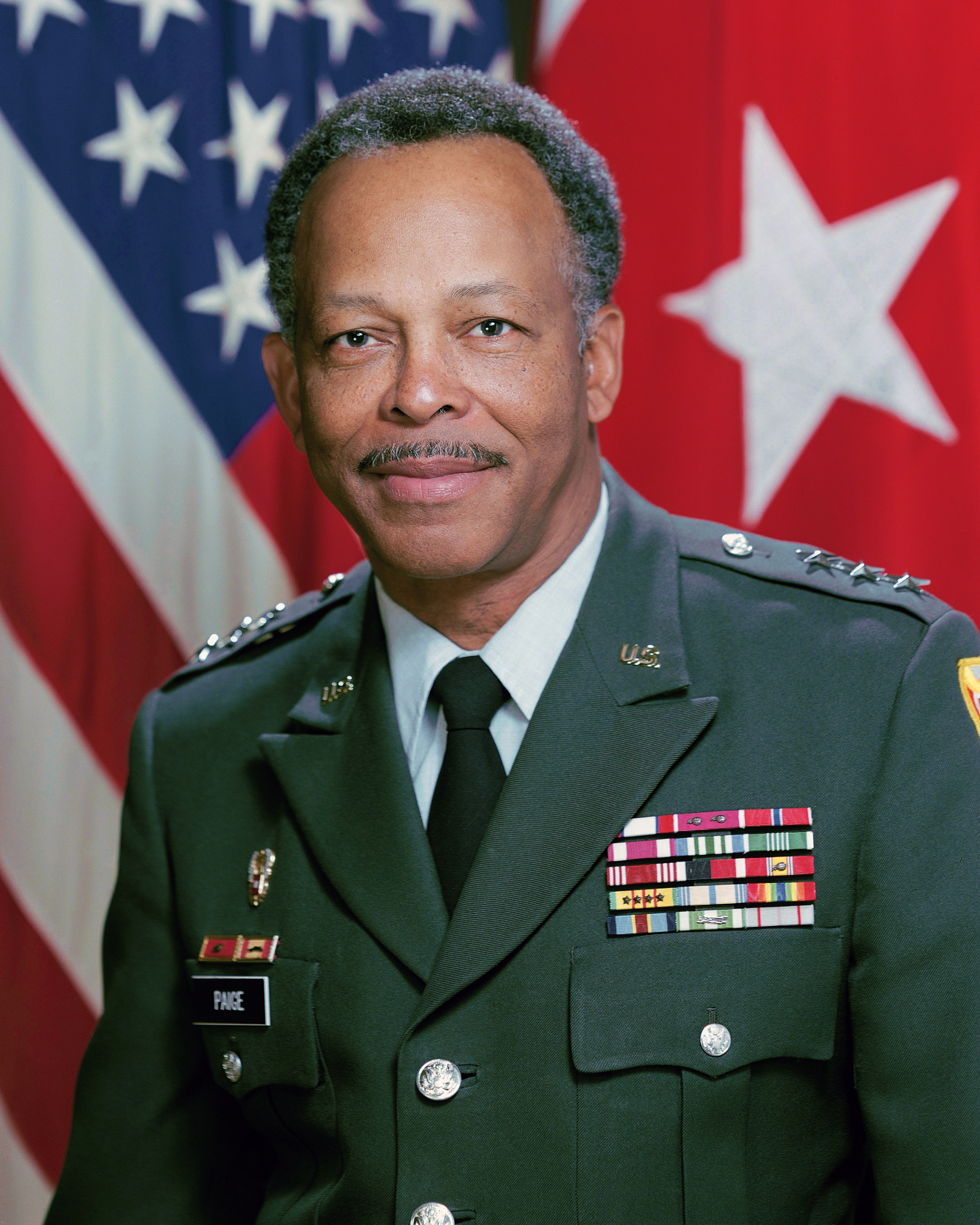
Lt. Gen. Paige in 1988

On 15 May 1984, Paige was nominated for promotion to lieutenant general. The nomination was confirmed by voice vote of the Senate on 24 May 1984. He was assigned to command Army Information Systems Command and Fort Huachuca until his retirement on 1 August 1988.

On 19 May 1993, Paige was nominated to be an Assistant Secretary of Defense by President Bill Clinton. He appeared before the Senate Committee on Armed Services on 25 May 1993, was reported favorably by the committee on 26 May 1993 and was then confirmed by unanimous consent of the full Senate on 28 May 1993. Paige subsequently served in this post from June 1993 to May 1997.

Upon his retirement, the Parade Grounds of Fort Ritchie, a now decommissioned Army Post, was named in his honor in 1988.

== Awards ==
His military honors include two Distinguished Service Medals, three awards of the Legion of Merit, the Bronze Star Medal and the Meritorious Service Medal.

Paige was awarded an honorary Doctor of Law degree by Tougaloo College, a second honorary Doctor of Law degree by the University of Maryland, Baltimore County in May 1992 and an honorary Doctor of Science degree by Clarkson University in May 1995.

== Personal ==
Paige was married to Gloria McClary (6 March 1932 – 23 April 2016). The couple had a daughter, two sons, eight grandchildren and, as of 2017, four great-grandchildren. Paige and his wife are interred at Arlington National Cemetery.
