= Power to the edge =

Power to the edge refers to the ability of an organization to dynamically synchronize its actions; achieve command and control (C2) agility; and increase the speed of command over a robust, networked grid. The term is most commonly used in relation to military organizations, but it can equally be used in a civilian context.

"Power to the edge" is an information and organization management philosophy first articulated by the U.S. Department of Defense in a publication by Dr. David S. Alberts and Richard E. Hayes in 2003 titled: "Power to the Edge: Command...Control...in the Information Age." This book was published by the Command and Control Research Program and can be downloaded from the Program's website.

== Principles ==
Power to the edge advocates the following:

- Achieving situational awareness rather than creating a single operational picture
- Self-synchronizing operations instead of autonomous operations
- Information "pull" rather than broadcast information "push"
- Collaborative efforts rather than individual efforts
- Communities of Interest (COIs) rather than stovepipes
- "Task, post, process, use" rather than "task, process, exploit, disseminate"
- Handling information once rather than handling multiple data calls
- Sharing data rather than maintaining private data
- Persistent, continuous information assurance rather than perimeter, one-time security
- Bandwidth on demand rather than bandwidth limitations
- IP-based transport rather than circuit-based transport
- Net-Ready KPP rather than interoperability KPP
- Enterprise services rather than separate infrastructures
- COTS based, net-centric capabilities rather than customized, platform-centric IT

== Agility ==
The philosophy of power to the edge is aimed at achieving organizational agility. Such agility has six attributes:

- Robustness: the ability to maintain effectiveness across a range of tasks, situations, and conditions
- Resilience: the ability to recover from or adjust to misfortune, damage, or a destabilizing perturbation in the environment
- Responsiveness: the ability to react to a change in the environment in a timely manner
- Flexibility: the ability to employ multiple ways to succeed and the capacity to move seamlessly between them
- Innovation: the ability to do new things and the ability to do old things in new ways
- Adaptation: the ability to change work processes and the ability to change the organization

== See also ==
- Network-centric organization
- Network-centric warfare
- Network simulator
