= Network-centric warfare =

American war theory about information gathering

Network-centric warfare, also called network-centric operations or net-centric warfare, is a military doctrine or theory of war that aims to translate an information advantage, enabled partly by information technology, into a competitive advantage through the computer networking of dispersed forces. It was pioneered by the United States Department of Defense in the 1990s.

== Background and history ==
In 1996, Admiral William Owens introduced the concept of a 'system of systems' in a paper published by the Institute for National Security Studies in the United States. He described a system of intelligence sensors, command and control systems, and precision weapons that provided situational awareness, rapid target assessment, and distributed weapon assignment.

Also in 1996, the United States' Joint Chiefs of Staff released Joint Vision 2010, which introduced the military concept of full-spectrum dominance. Full Spectrum Dominance described the ability of the US military to dominate the battlespace from peace operations through to the outright application of military power that stemmed from the advantages of information superiority.

=== Network Centric Warfare book ===
The term "network-centric warfare" and associated concepts first appeared in the United States Department of Navy's publication, "Copernicus: C4ISR for the 21st Century." The ideas of networking sensors, commanders, and shooters to flatten the hierarchy, reduce the operational pause, enhance precision, and increase speed of command were captured in this document. As a distinct concept, however, network-centric warfare first appeared publicly in a 1998 US Naval Institute Proceedings article by Vice Admiral Arthur K. Cebrowski and John Garstka. However, the first complete articulation of the idea was contained in the book Network Centric Warfare : Developing and Leveraging Information Superiority by David S. Alberts, John Garstka and Frederick Stein, published by the Command and Control Research Program (CCRP). This book derived a new theory of warfare from a series of case studies on how business was using information and communication technologies to improve situation analysis, accurately control inventory and production, as well as monitor customer relations.

The information revolution has permeated the military world as well, with network-centric warfare replacing traditional combat methods. Technology is now at the forefront of battlefields, creating a new era of warfare - network-centric.

A new level of communication and coordination is achieved through what is known as tactical interoperability. Human soldiers, smart weapon systems, command & control systems, automatic sentry systems, and platforms on land, air, and space are connected in a single communication fabric, which encompasses battle management systems for all services, catering to individuals from General HQs to soldiers on the field.

=== Understanding Information Age Warfare book ===
Network-centric warfare was followed in 2001 by Understanding Information Age Warfare (UIAW), jointly authored by Alberts, Garstka, Richard Hayes of Evidence Based Research and David A. Signori of RAND. UIAW pushed the implications of the shifts identified by network-centric warfare in order to derive an operational theory of warfare.

Starting with a series of premises on how the environment is sensed, UIAW describes three domains. The first is a physical domain, where events take place and are perceived by sensors and people. Data emerging from the physical domain is transmitted through an information domain. It is processed in a cognitive domain before being acted upon.

The process is similar to a "observe, orient, decide, act" loop described by Col. John Boyd of the USAF.

=== Power to the Edge book ===
The last publication dealing with the developing theory of network centric warfare appeared in 2003 with Power to the Edge, also published by the CCRP. Power to the Edge is a speculative work suggesting that modern military environments are far too complex to be understood by any one individual, organisation, or even military service.

Modern information technology permits the rapid and effective sharing of information to such a degree that "edge entities" or those that are essentially conducting military missions themselves, should be able to "pull" information from ubiquitous repositories, rather than having centralised agencies attempt to anticipate their information needs and "push" it to them. This would imply a major flattening of traditional military hierarchies, however.

Power To The Edge's radical ideas had been under investigation by the Pentagon since at least 2001. In UIAW, the concept of peer-to-peer activity combined with more traditional hierarchical flow of data in the network had been introduced.

Shortly thereafter, the Pentagon began investing in peer-to-peer research, telling software engineers at a November 2001 peer-to-peer conference that there were advantages to be gained in the redundancy and robustness of a peer-to-peer network topology on the battlefield.

Network-centric warfare/operations is a cornerstone of the ongoing transformation effort at the Department of Defense initiated by former Secretary of Defense Donald Rumsfeld. It is also one of the five goals of the Office of Force Transformation, Office of the Secretary of Defense.

See Revolution in Military Affairs for further information on what is now known as "defense transformation" or "transformation".

== Related technologies and programs ==
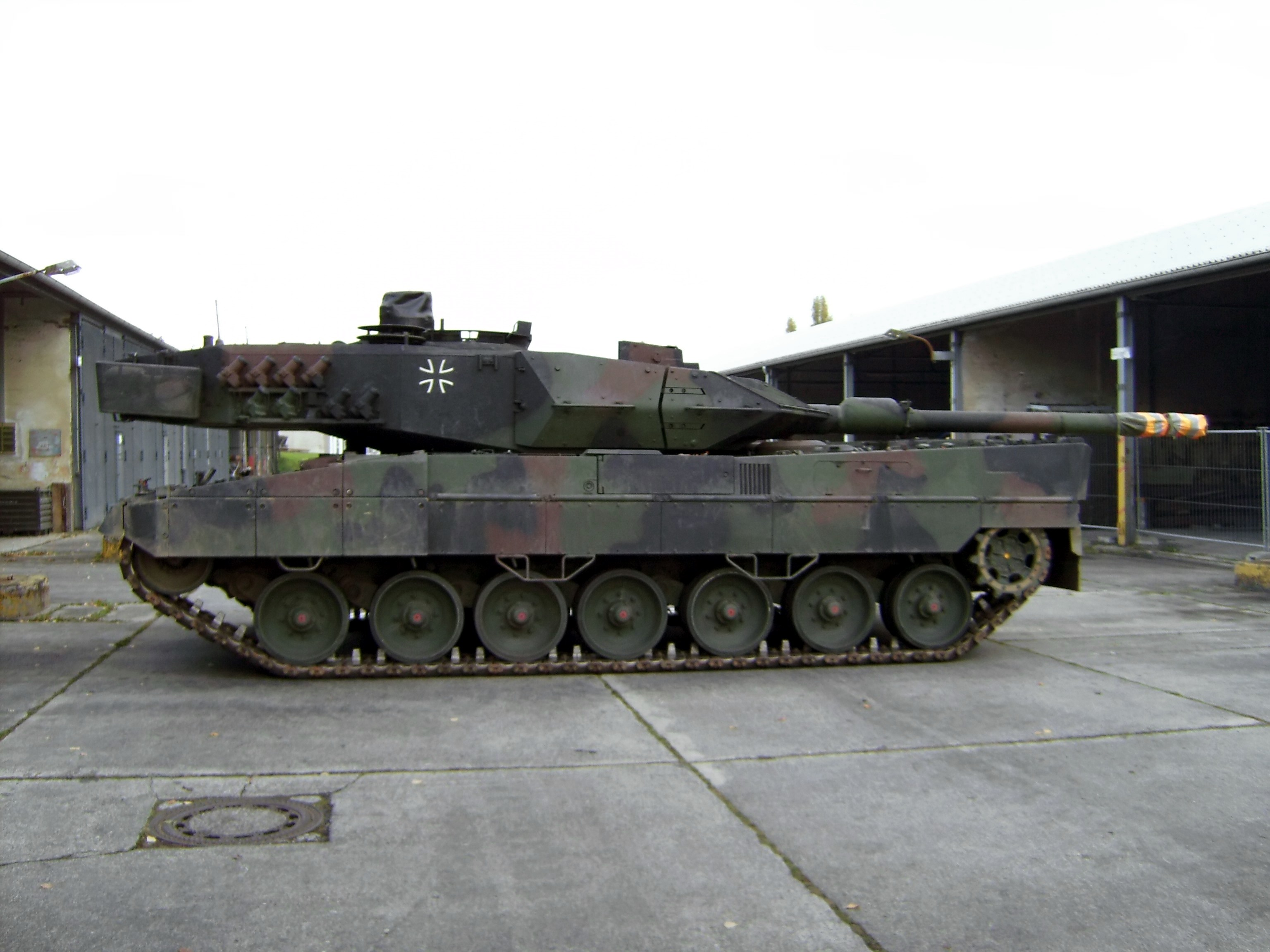
German Army Leopard 2A6M that incorporates systems designed to be used in conjunction with a networked battlefield

The US DOD has mandated that the Global Information Grid (GIG) will be the primary technical framework to support US network-centric warfare/network-centric operations. Under this directive, all advanced weapons platforms, sensor systems, and command and control centers are eventually to be linked via the GIG. The term system of systems is often used to describe the results of these types of massive integration efforts.

The topic Net-Centric Enterprise Services addresses the applications context of the GIG.

A number of significant U.S. military programs are taking technical steps towards supporting network-centric warfare. These include the Cooperative Engagement Capability (CEC) of the United States Navy and the BCT Network of the United States Army.

Net-Centric Enterprise Solutions for Interoperability (NESI) provides, for all phases of the acquisition of net-centric solutions, actionable guidance that meets network-centric warfare goals of the United States Department of Defense. The guidance in NESI is derived from the higher level, more abstract concepts provided in various directives, policies and mandates such as the Net-Centric Operations and Warfare Reference Model (NCOW RM) and the ASD(NII) Net-Centric Checklist.

== Doctrinal tenets in United States ==
The doctrine of network-centric warfare for the United States armed forces draws its highest level of guidance from the concept of "team warfare", meaning the integration and synchronization of all appropriate capabilities across the various services, ranging from Army to Air Force to Coast Guard. This is part of the principle of joint warfare.

The tenets of network-centric warfare are:

- Tenet 1: A robustly networked force improves information sharing.
- Tenet 2: Information sharing and collaboration enhance the quality of information and shared situational awareness.
- Tenet 3: Shared situational awareness enables self-synchronization.
- Tenet 4: These, in turn, dramatically increase mission effectiveness.

Net-centric operations are compatible with Mission Command doctrine, which theoretically allows considerable freedom of action for combat troops, and with more decentralized approaches to command and control (C2).

== Some architectural and design challenges ==
- The complexity of the Joint Tactical Radio System (JTRS) offers insight into the challenges of integrating numerous different communications systems into a unified whole. It is intended to be a software-defined radio for battlefield communications that will be backwards compatible with a very large number of other military and civilian radio systems.
- An April 10, 2008 GAO report (GAO FCS report) highlighted the scalability of the network as a major risk factor to the Network Centric FCS program. The proposed system will be unable to network all the units into one self-forming, self-healing network.
- The problem of coordinating bandwidth usage in a battlespace is a significant challenge, when every piece of mobile equipment and human participant becomes a potential source or relay of RF emissions.
- It is difficult to efficiently transfer information between networks having different levels of security classification. Although multi-level security systems provide part of the solution, human intervention and decision-making is still needed to determine what specific data can and cannot be transferred.
- Accurate locational awareness is limited when maneuvering in areas where Global Positioning System (GPS) coverage is weak or non-existent. These areas include the inside of buildings, caves, etc. as well as built-up areas and urban canyons, which are also settings for many modern military operations. Much work on reliable fusion of positional data from multiple sensors remains to be done.
- Providing secure communications in network-centric warfare/network-centric operations is difficult, since successful key management for encryption is typically the most difficult aspect of cryptography, especially with mobile systems. The problem is exacerbated with the need for speedy deployment and nimble reconfiguration of military teams, to respond to rapidly changing conditions in the modern battlespace.

== International activities ==
There is significant need to harmonize the technical and operational aspects of net-centric warfare and net-centric operations among multiple nations, in order to support coalition activities, joint operations, etc. The NATO Command Structure and many NATO and non-NATO nations have joined the Federated Mission Networking (FMN) initiative and work together under the FMN Framework Process to coordinate the design, development and delivery of operational and technical capabilities required to conduct net-centric operations. Within the Alliance the NATO Interoperability Standards and Profiles (NISP) provides the necessary guidance and technical components to support project implementations and Federated Mission Networking. Individual Standardization Agreements are the coordinating vehicle for establishing shared technical standards among NATO nations.

See also Partnership for Peace for information on extending coordination efforts to non-NATO nations that are keen to support military operations other than war activities, such as international peacekeeping, disaster response, humanitarian aid, etc.

== Supporting comments ==
"With less than half of the ground forces and two-thirds of the military aircraft used 12 years ago in Desert Storm, we have achieved a far more difficult objective. ... In Desert Storm, it usually took up to two days for target planners to get a photo of a target, confirm its coordinates, plan the mission, and deliver it to the bomber crew. Now we have near real-time imaging of targets with photos and coordinates transmitted by e-mail to aircraft already in flight. In Desert Storm, battalion, brigade, and division commanders had to rely on maps, grease pencils, and radio reports to track the movements of our forces. Today, our commanders have a real-time display of our armed forces on their computer screen."

—former Vice President Richard Cheney.

"Net-centric warfare's effectiveness has greatly improved in 12 years. Desert Storm forces, involving more than 500,000 troops, were supported with 100 Mbit/s of bandwidth. Today, OIF forces, with about 350,000 warfighters, had more than 3,000 Mbit/s of satellite bandwidth, which is 30 times more bandwidth for a force 45 percent smaller. U.S. troops essentially used the same weapon platforms used in Operation Desert Storm with significantly increased effectiveness."

—Lieutenant general Harry D. Raduege Jr, director, Defense Information Systems Agency.

== Contradictory views ==
"Our incipient NCW plans may suffer defeat by [adversaries] using primitive but cagey techniques, inspired by an ideology we can neither match nor understand; or by an enemy who can knock out our vulnerable Global Positioning System or use electromagnetic pulse weapons on a limited scale, removing intelligence as we have construed it and have come to depend upon. Fighting forces accustomed to relying upon downlinks for information and commands would have little to fall back upon."

— Charles Perrow, Information Assurance, National Defense University, May 2003

The aspiration of the Australian Defence Force (ADF) to embrace network-centric warfare is outlined in the document ADF Force 2020. This vision has been criticized by Aldo Borgu, director of the Australian Strategic Policy Institute (ASPI). By developing interoperability with U.S. systems, in his view, the three arms of the Australian Defence Force could end up operating better with their sister United States services than with each other.

Network centric warfare is criticized by proponents of Fourth Generation Warfare (4GW) doctrine.

Also, since Network-centric warfare focuses so much on distributing information, one has to be wary of the effect of false, misleading, or misinterpreted information entering the system, be it through enemy deception or simple error. Just as the usefulness of correct information can be amplified, so too can the repercussions of incorrect data entering the system achieve much greater non-positive outcomes.

One way that this can happen is through errors in initial conditions in an uncorrected, closed system that subsequently skew result-sets; the result-sets are then reused, amplifying the initial error by orders of magnitude in subsequent generations of result-sets; see chaos theory.

Other possible failure modes or problem areas in network-centric warfare include the occurrence of the Byzantine generals' problem in peer-to-peer systems; problems caused by an inadequate or a shallow understanding of (or general disregard for) self-regulation, self-organization, systems theory, emergent behavior and cybernetics; in addition to this, there are potential issues arising from the very nature of any complex, rapidly developed artificial system arising from complexity theory, which implies the possibility of failure modes such as congestion collapse or cascading failure.

== See also ==
- Autonomous logistics
- Battlespace
- C4ISTAR
- Cyberwarfare
- Information warfare
- List of cyber warfare forces
- Network simulator
