= Military communications =

Messages within armed forces

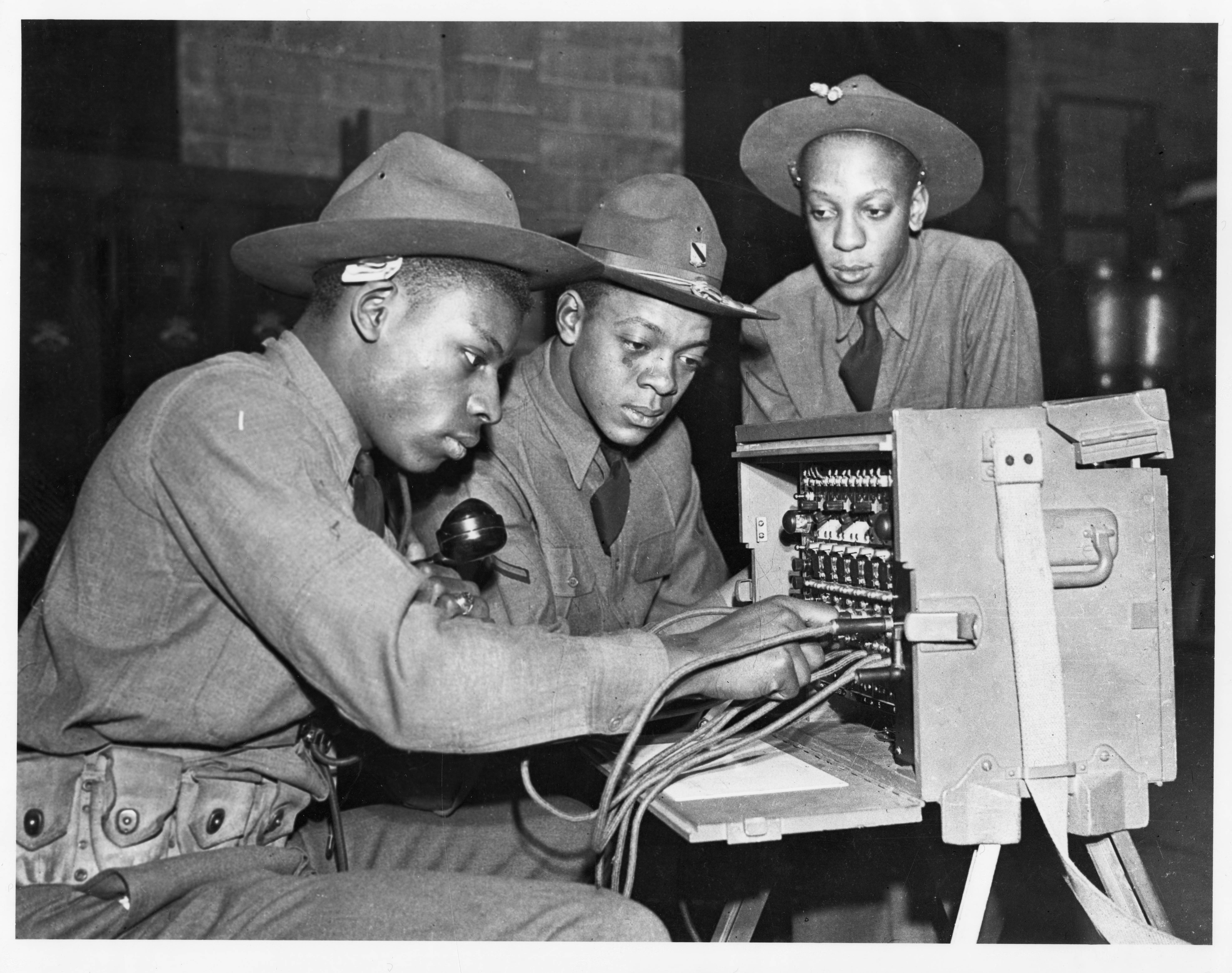
United States Army Signal Corps switchboard operators in the 1940s

Military communications or military signals involve all aspects of communications, or conveyance of information, by armed forces. Examples from Jane's Military Communications include text, audio, facsimile, tactical ground-based communications, naval signalling, terrestrial microwave, tropospheric scatter, satellite communications systems and equipment, surveillance and signal analysis, security, direction finding and jamming. The most urgent purposes are to communicate information to commanders and orders from them.

Military communications span from pre-history to the present. The earliest military communications were delivered by runners. Later, communications progressed to visual signals. For example, Naval ships would use flag signaling to communicate from ship to ship. These flags are a uniform set of easily identifiable nautical codes that would convey visual messages and codes between ships and from ship to shore. Then militaries discovered methods to use audible signaling to communicate with each other. This way of communicating was possible because of telegraphs. They are an electronic device that is used by a sender and when the sender presses on the telegraph key, they interrupt the current creating an audible pulse that is heard at the receiving station. The receiver then decodes the pulses to decode the messages. Since then, military communication has evolved and advanced much further. Today, there are many perspectives used to examine how troops around the world communicate. Anthony King states how Military sociologists have attempted to explain how military institutions develop and maintain high levels of social cohesion.

== History ==
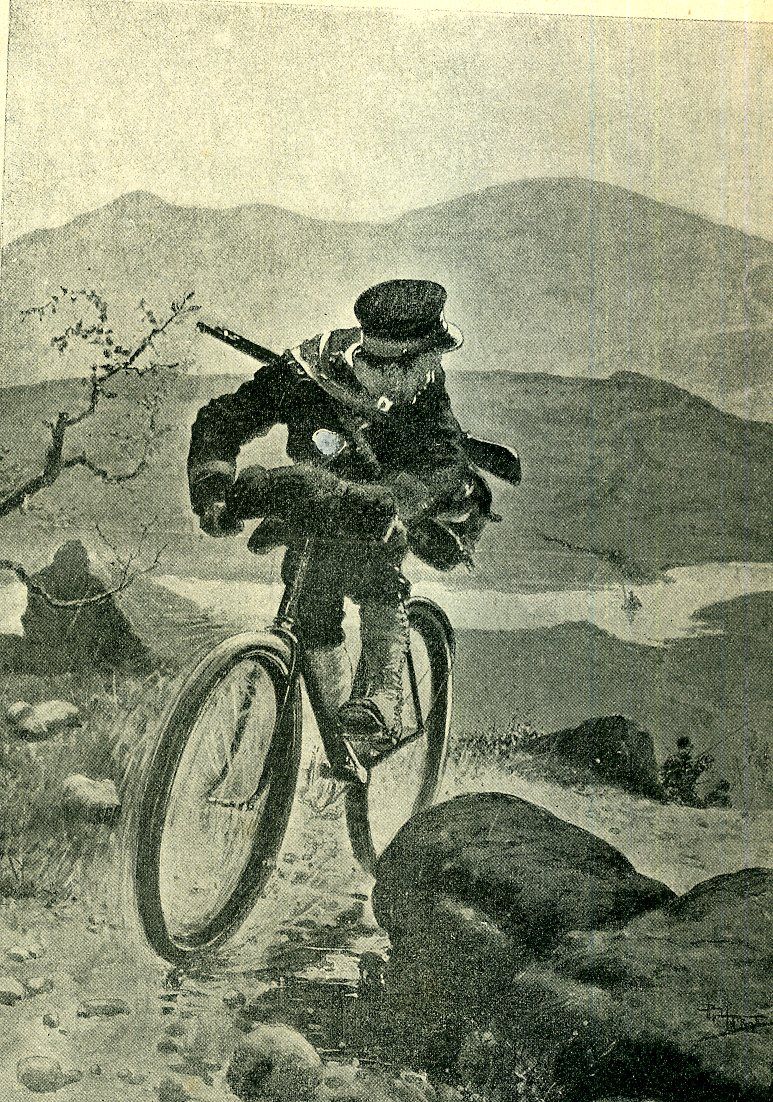
A Japanese courier pursued by Cossacks during the Russo-Japanese War, 1904

In past centuries communicating a message usually required someone to go to the destination, bringing the message. Thus, the term communication often implied the ability to transport people and supplies. A place under siege was one that lost communication in both senses. The association between transport and messaging declined in recent centuries.

The first military communications involved the use of runners or the sending and receiving of simple signals (sometimes encoded to be unrecognizable). The first distinctive uses of military communications were called semaphore. Modern units specializing in these tactics are usually designated as signal corps. The Roman system of military communication (cursus publicus or cursus vehicularis) is an early example of this. Later, the terms signals and signaller became words referring to a highly-distinct military occupation dealing with general communications methods (similar to those in civil use) rather than with weapons.

Present-day military forces of an informational society conduct intense and complicated communicating activities on a daily basis, using modern telecommunications and computing methods. Only a small portion of these activities are directly related to combat actions. Modern concepts of network-centric warfare (NCW) rely on network-oriented methods of communications and control to make existing forces more effective.

== Military communications equipment ==
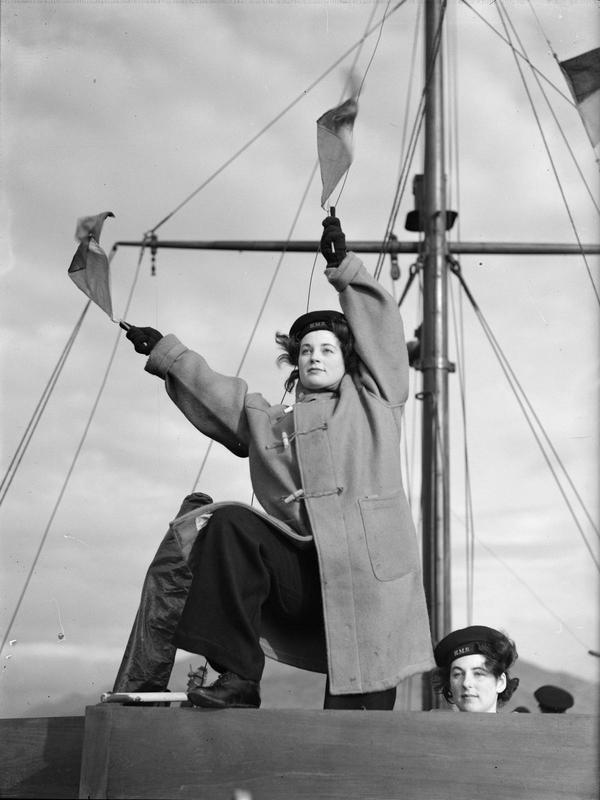
WRNS signalwomen training naval signalling, 1943

Drums, horns, flags, and riders on horseback were some of the early methods the military used to send messages over distances. The advent of distinctive signals led to the formation of the signal corps, a group specialized in the tactics of military communications. The signal corps evolved into a distinctive occupation where the signaller became a highly technical job dealing with all available communications methods including civil ones.

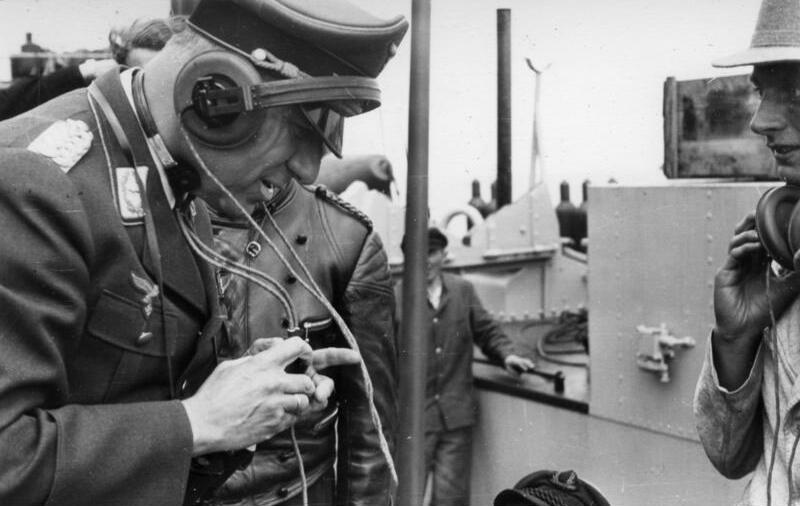
A Luftwaffe officer using a radio kit on a Panzer III, 1940

In the middle 20th century radio equipment came to dominate the field. Many modern pieces of military communications equipment are built to both encrypt and decode transmissions and survive rough treatment in hostile climates. They use different frequencies to send signals to other radio stations to communicate. Radios have played a major role in military communication. Since they are capable of sending radio waves to transmit voice signals over long distances. This can be helpful for communication on the battlefield since it is a good way to send messages undetected over long distances. Radios are also very reliable because even in harsh weather conditions they are still able to help communicate among the soldiers. Militaries still use radios and continue to improve the technology because of their durability and reliability for military communication. Spelling alphabets such as the NATO phonetic alphabet are used to aid radio communications by reducing ambiguity between letters.

Military communications – or "comms" – are activities, equipment, techniques, and tactics used by the military in some of the most hostile areas of the earth and in challenging environments such as battlefields, on land (compare radio in a box), underwater and also in air. Military comms include command, control and communications and intelligence and were known as the C3I model before computers were fully integrated. The U.S. Army expanded the model to C4I when it recognized the vital role played by automated computer equipment to send and receive large, bulky amounts of data.

In the modern world, most nations attempt to minimize the risk of war caused by miscommunication or inadequate communication. As a result, military communication is intense and complicated and often motivates the development of advanced technology for remote systems such as satellites. Satellites have been improving and are being used more and more for communication. They are being made to have higher transmission capacity to help with their communication abilities. The military is upgrading satellites to be immune to interference during combat operations. This advancement will establish stable, high-quality information highways for long distance communication. Aircraft are also beneficial for communication, both crewed and uncrewed, as well as computers. Computers and their varied applications have revolutionized military comms. Although military communication is designed for warfare, it also supports intelligence-gathering and communication between adversaries, and thus sometimes prevents war.

The six categories of military comms are:

- alert measurement systems
- cryptography
- military radio systems
- command and control
- signal corps
- network-centric warfare

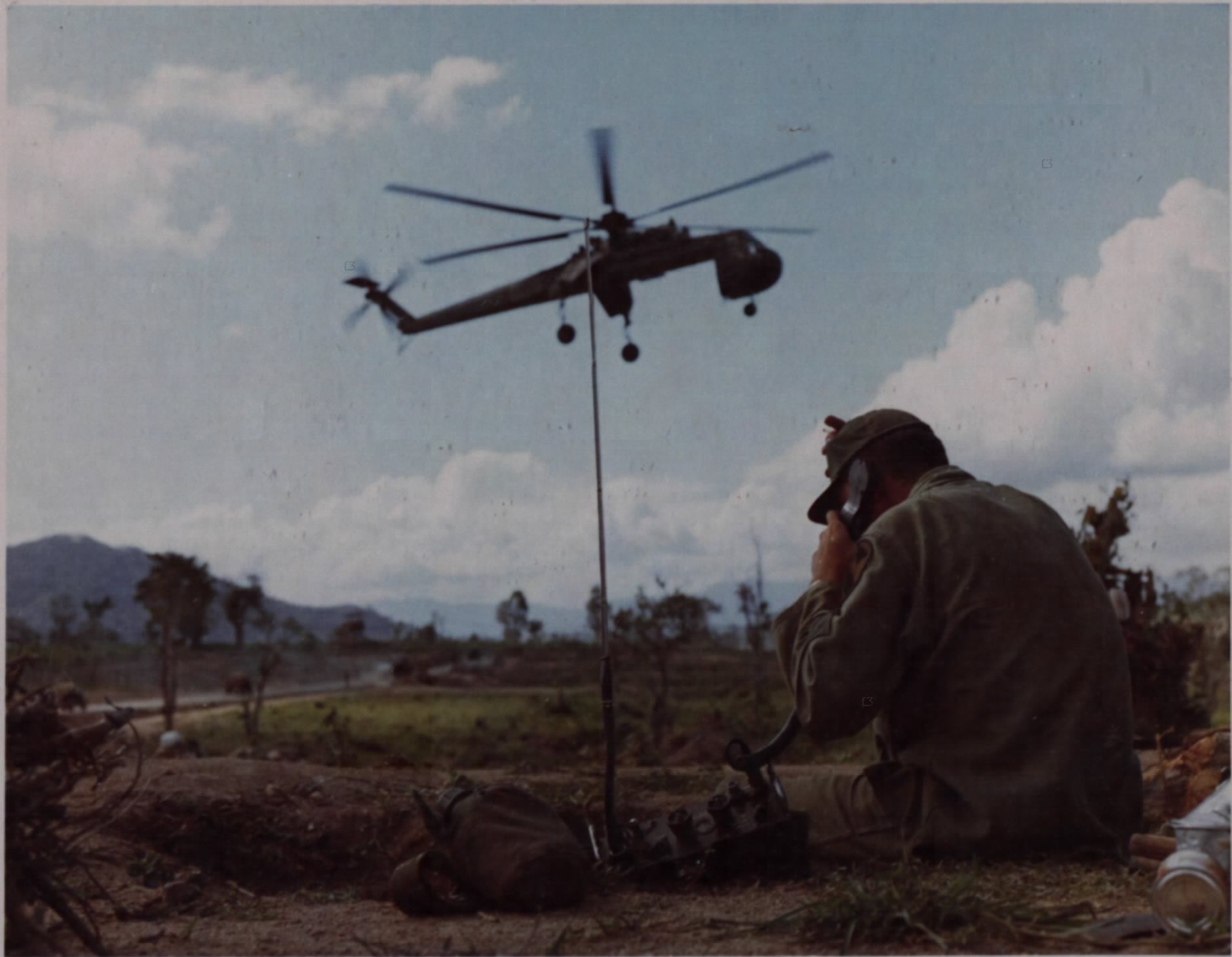
A United States Army radioman communicating with a CH-54 Tarhe during the Vietnam War

The alert measurement systems are various states of alertness or readiness for the armed forces used around the world during a state of war, act of terrorism or a military attack against a state. They are known by different acronyms, such as DEFCON, or defense readiness condition, used by the U.S. Armed Forces.

Cryptography is the study of methods of converting messages to a form unreadable except to one who knows how to decrypt them. This ancient military comms art gained new importance with the rise of radio systems whose signals traveled far and were easily intercepted. Cryptographic software is also widely used in civilian commerce.

== Commercial refile ==
In United States military communications systems, commercial refile refers to sending a military message via a commercial communications network. The message may come from a military network, such as a tape relay network, a point-to-point telegraph network, a radio-telegraph network, or the Defense Switched Network. Commercial refiling of a message will usually require a reformatting of the message, particularly the heading.

== See also ==
- Jane's Military Communications
- Command and control
- Signal Corps (disambiguation)
- Telecommunications
- Communications protection
- Electronic warfare
- Signals intelligence (SIGINT)
- Defence Information Infrastructure
- Kiev Military Institute of Control and Signals
- Luftwaffe radio equipment of World War II
- Bowman (British Army communications system)
- Parakeet (Australian Army communications system)
- Military Wireless Museum in the Midlands
- Telegraph troops

=== Forms of signalling ===
- Military hand and arm signals
- Morse code
- Flag semaphore
- Flag signals
- Naval flag signalling
- Signal lamp
- Heliograph
- Radio communications
- Wireless telegraphy
