= Command and control =

Military exercise of authority by a commanding officer over assigned forces

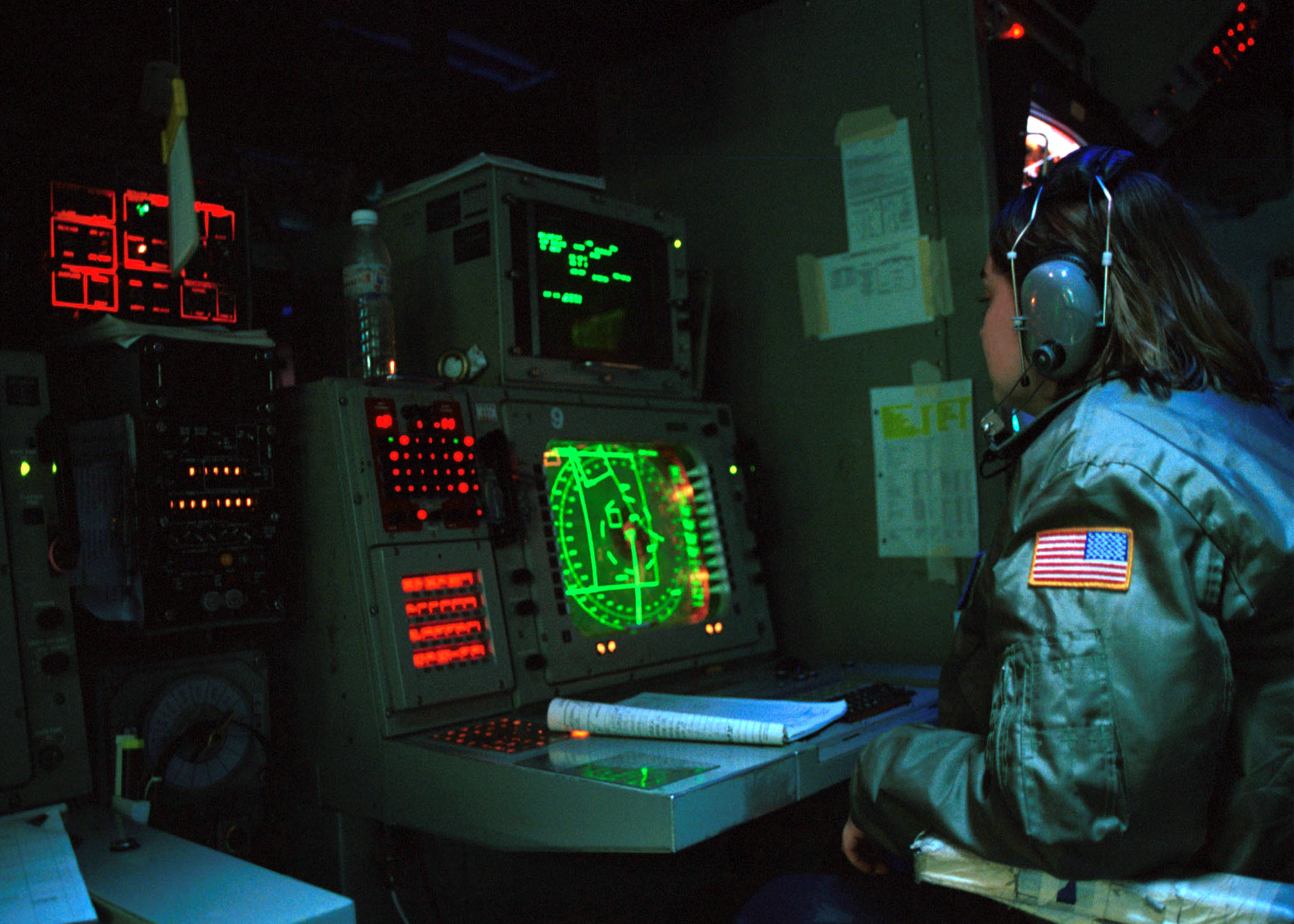
A watchstander at her station in the combat information center of USS Carl Vinson in 2001

Command and control (abbr. C2) is a "set of organizational and technical attributes and processes ... [that] employs human, physical, and information resources to solve problems and accomplish missions" to achieve the goals of an organization or enterprise, according to a 2015 definition by military scientists Marius Vassiliou, David S. Alberts, and Jonathan R. Agre.

Versions of the United States Army Field Manual 3-0 circulated circa 1999 define C2 in a military organization as the exercise of authority and direction by a properly designated commanding officer over assigned and attached forces in the accomplishment of a mission.

A 1988 NATO definition is that command and control is the exercise of authority and direction by a properly designated individual over assigned resources in the accomplishment of a common goal. An Australian Defence Force definition, similar to that of NATO, emphasises that C2 is the system empowering designated personnel to exercise lawful authority and direction over assigned forces for the accomplishment of missions and tasks. The Australian doctrine goes on to state: "The use of agreed terminology and definitions is fundamental to any C2 system and the development of joint doctrine and procedures. The definitions in the following paragraphs have some agreement internationally, although not every potential ally will use the terms with exactly the same meaning."

== Overview ==
=== US perspective ===
The US Department of Defense Dictionary of Military and Associated Terms defines command and control as: "The exercise of authority and direction by a properly designated commander over assigned and attached forces in the accomplishment of the mission. Also called C2. Source: JP 1".

The edition of the Dictionary "As Amended Through April 2010" elaborates, "Command and control functions are performed through an arrangement of personnel, equipment, communications, facilities, and procedures employed by a commander in planning, directing, coordinating, and controlling forces and operations in the accomplishment of the mission." However, this sentence is missing from the "command and control" entry for the edition "As Amended Through 15 August 2014."

Commanding officers are assisted in executing these tasks by specialized staff officers and enlisted personnel. These military staff are a group of officers and enlisted personnel that provides a bi-directional flow of information between a commanding officer and subordinate military units.

The purpose of a military staff is mainly that of providing accurate, timely information which by category represents information on which command decisions are based. The key application is that of decisions that effectively manage unit resources. While information flow toward the commander is a priority, information that is useful or contingent in nature is communicated to lower staffs and units.

=== Computer security industry ===
This term is also in common use within the computer security industry and in the context of cyberwarfare. Here the term refers to the influence an attacker has over a compromised computer system that they control. For example, a valid usage of the term is to say that attackers use "command and control infrastructure" to issue "command and control instructions" to their victims. Advanced analysis of command and control methodologies can be used to identify attackers, associate attacks, and disrupt ongoing malicious activity.

== Derivative terms ==
There is a plethora of derivative terms that emphasize various aspects, uses, and sub-domains of C2. These terms are accompanied by numerous associated abbreviations. For example, in addition to C2, command and control is often abbreviated as C2 and sometimes as C&C.

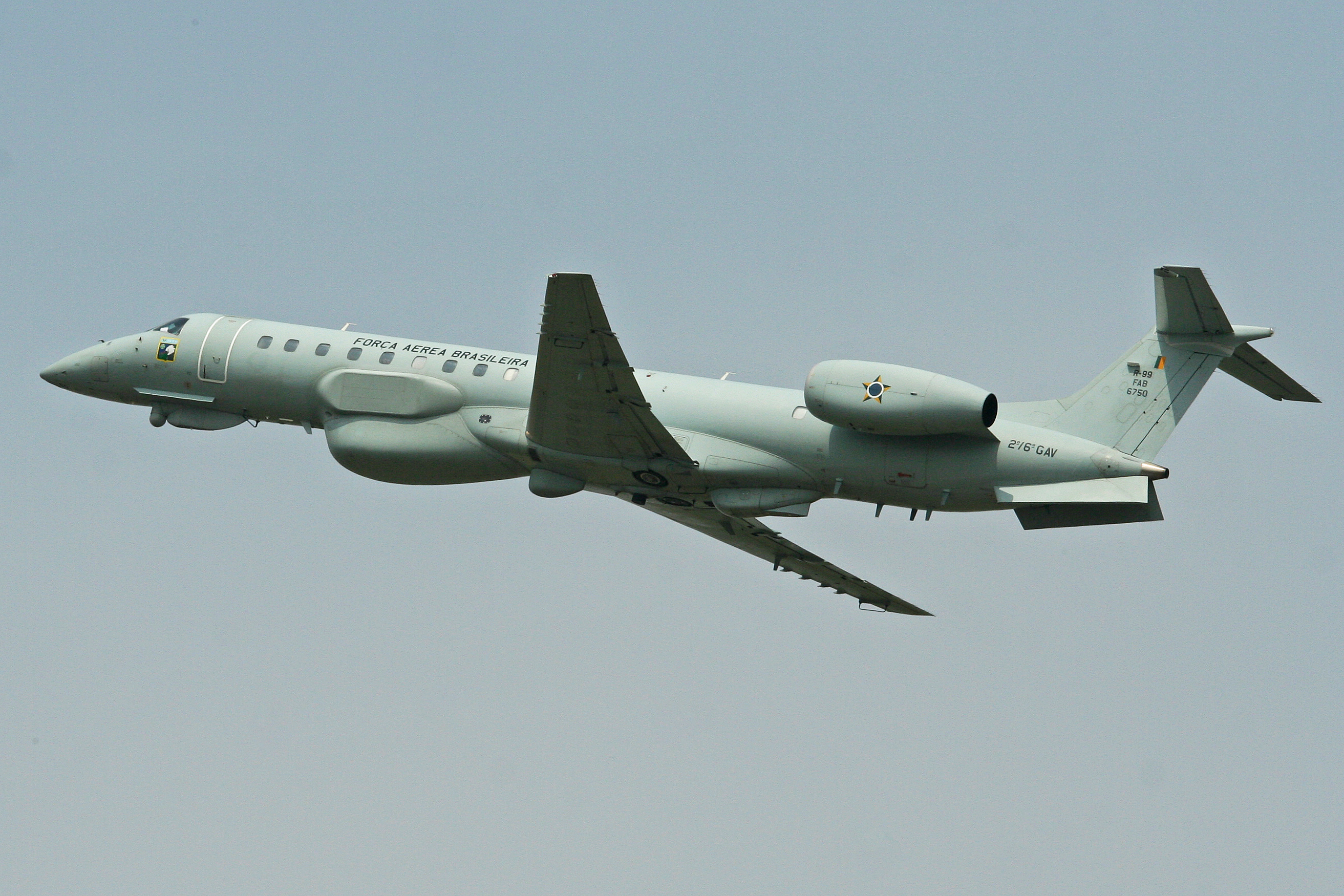
Embraer R-99 MULTI INTEL, an example of aircraft with C3I capabilities

"Command and control" have been coupled with:

- Collaboration
- Communication / communications
- Computers / computing
- Electronic warfare
- Interoperability
- Reconnaissance
- Surveillance
- Target acquisition

and others.

Some of the more common variations include:

- C2I – command, control & information
- C4, C4I, C4ISR, C4ISTAR, C4ISREW, C4ISTAREW – plus computers (technology focus) or computing (human activity focus)
- C6ISR – command, control, communications, computers, cyber-defense and combat systems and intelligence, surveillance, and reconnaissance
- NC2 − nuclear command and control

and others.

Command: The exercise of authority based upon certain knowledge to attain an objective.
Control: The process of verifying and correcting activity such that the objective or goal of command is accomplished.
Communication: Ability to exercise the necessary liaison to exercise effective command between tactical or strategic units to command.
Computers: The computer systems and compatibility of computer systems. Also includes data processing.
Intelligence: Includes collection as well as analysis and distribution of information.

== Command and control centers ==
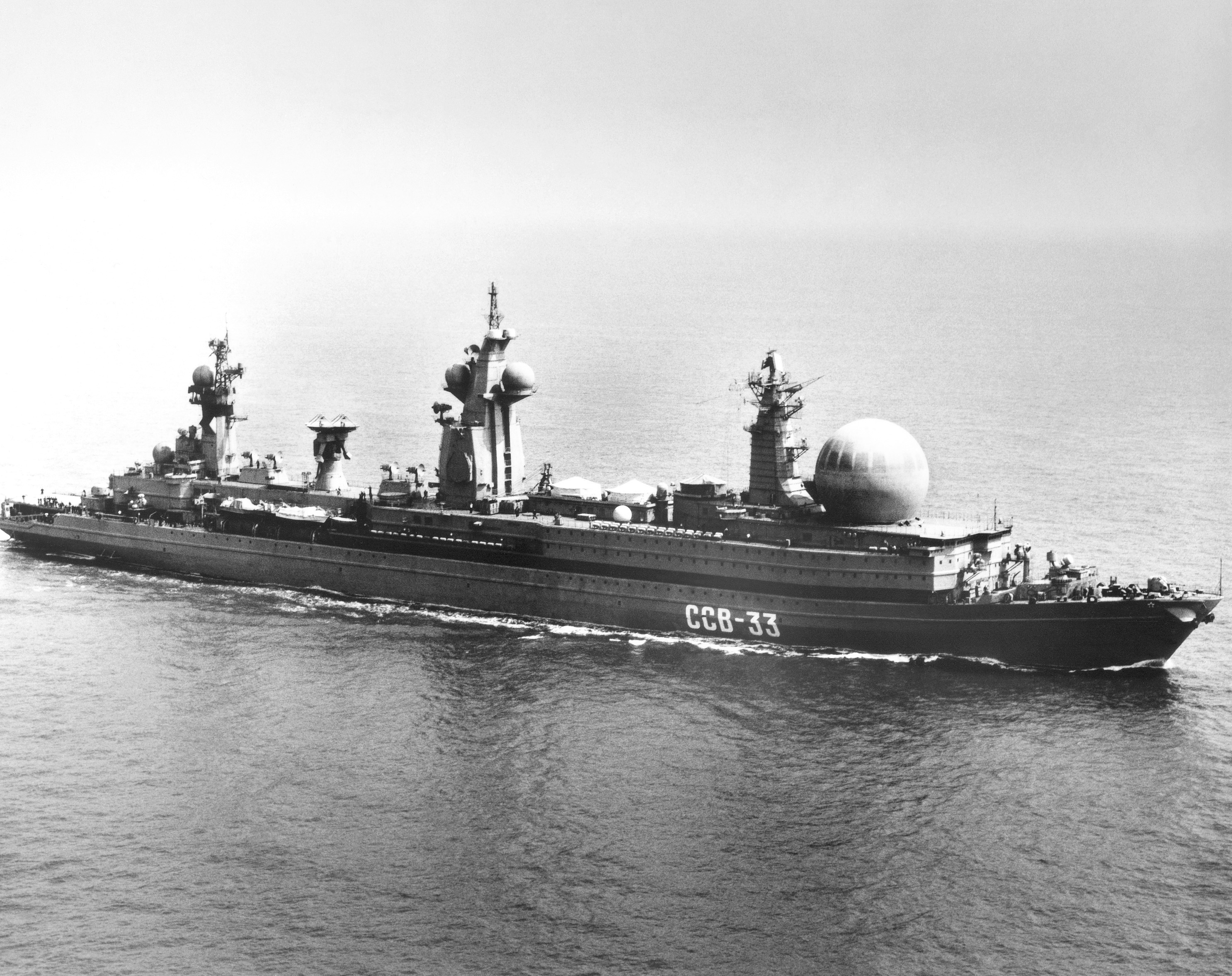
The Soviet nuclear-powered command and control naval ship SSV-33 Ural in 1988

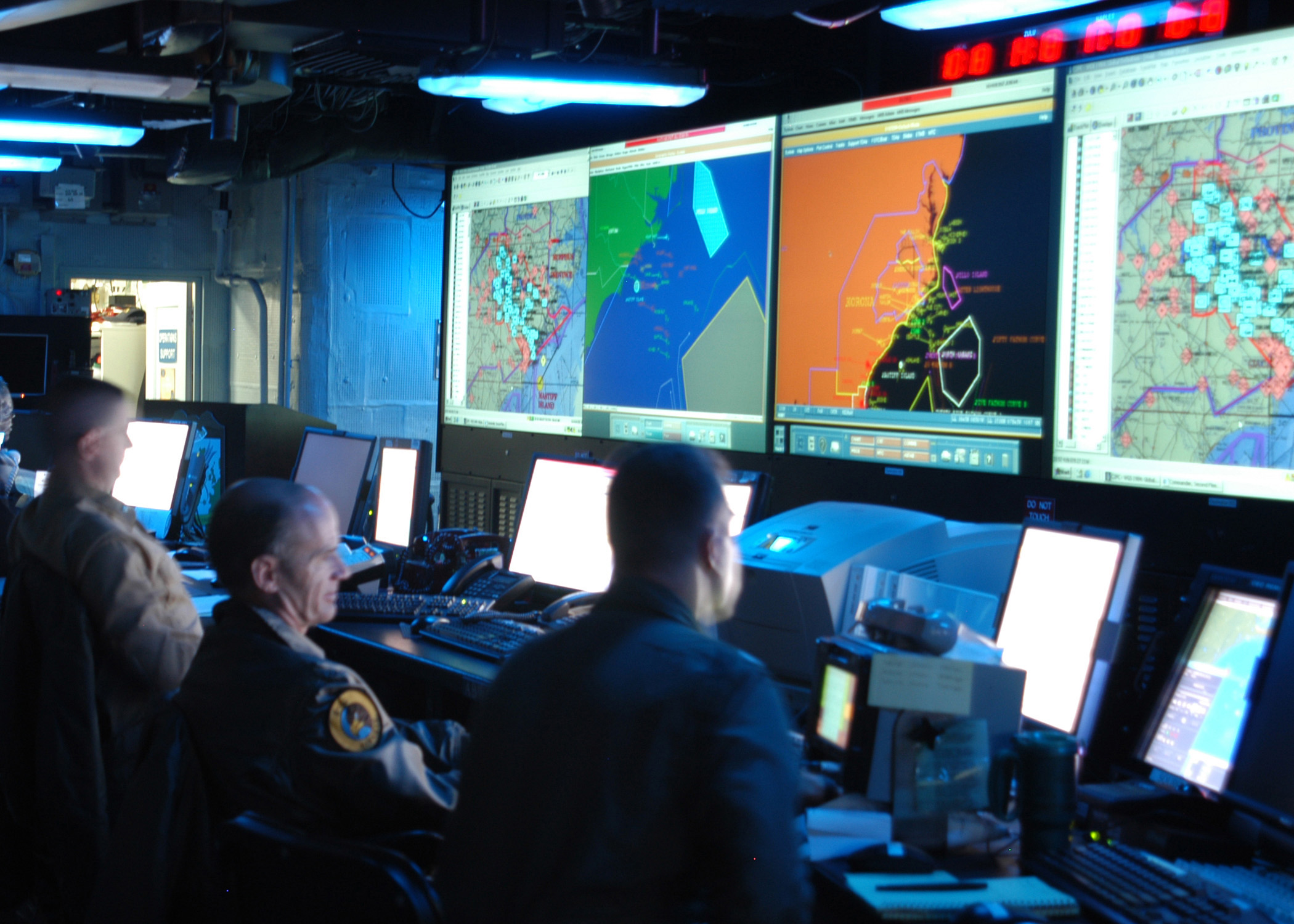
Joint Operations Center watch standers aboard the command ship USS Mount Whitney in 2005

A command and control center is typically a secure room or building in a government, military or prison facility that operates as the agency's dispatch center, surveillance monitoring center, coordination office and alarm monitoring center all in one. Command and control centers are operated by a government or municipal agency.

Various branches of the US military such as the US Coast Guard and Navy have command and control centers. They are also common in many large correctional facilities.

A command and control center that is used by a military unit in a deployed location is usually called a "command post". A warship has a combat information center for tactical control of the ship's resources, but commanding a fleet or joint operation requires additional space for commanders and staff plus C4I facilities provided on a flagship (e.g., aircraft carriers), sometimes a command ship or upgraded logistics ship such as USS Coronado.

== Command and control warfare ==
Command and control warfare encompasses all the military tactics that use communications technology. It can be abbreviated as C^{2}W. An older name for these tactics is "signals warfare", derived from the name given to communications by the military. Newer names include information operations and information warfare.

The following techniques are combined:

- Cyber operations

with the physical destruction of enemy communications facilities. The objective is to deny information to the enemy and so disrupt its command and control capabilities. At the same time precautions are taken to protect friendly command and control capabilities against retaliation.

In addition to targeting the enemy's command and control, information warfare can be directed to the enemy's politicians and other civilian communications.

- Electronic warfare (EW)
- Military deception
- Operations security (OPSEC)
- Psychological operations (PSYOP)
- Psychological warfare

== See also ==
- Battlespace
- Battle command
- Civilian control of the military
- Command and control warfare
- Command center
- Command ship
- Communications protection
- Defence Information Infrastructure
- Electronic warfare
- Fingerspitzengefühl
- Fog of war
- Intent (military)
- International Command and Control Research and Technology Symposium
- Military communications
- Mission Command
- Mission-type tactics
- Network-centric warfare
- Reconnaissance, surveillance, and target acquisition (RSTA)
- Signal Corps (disambiguation)
- Signals intelligence (SIGINT)
- Situation room
- Surveillance and Target Acquisition (STA)

US and other NATO specific:

- 505th Command and Control Wing
- Command and Control Research Program (CCRP)
- Command systems in the United States Army
- Deployable Joint Command and Control
- Future Combat Systems Command and Control Vehicle
- Global Command and Control System
- Joint Force Air Component Headquarters
- Joint Interoperability of Tactical Command and Control Systems
- National Command Authority (United States)
- NATO Communications and Information Systems Agency
- NATO Consultation, Command and Control Agency
- NORAD
- Worldwide Military Command and Control System

Other

- Military Institute of Telecommunications and Information Technologies
