= Military Institute of Telecommunications and Information Technologies =

Military college in Kyiv, Ukraine

Coordinates: 50.421667°N 30.556944°E

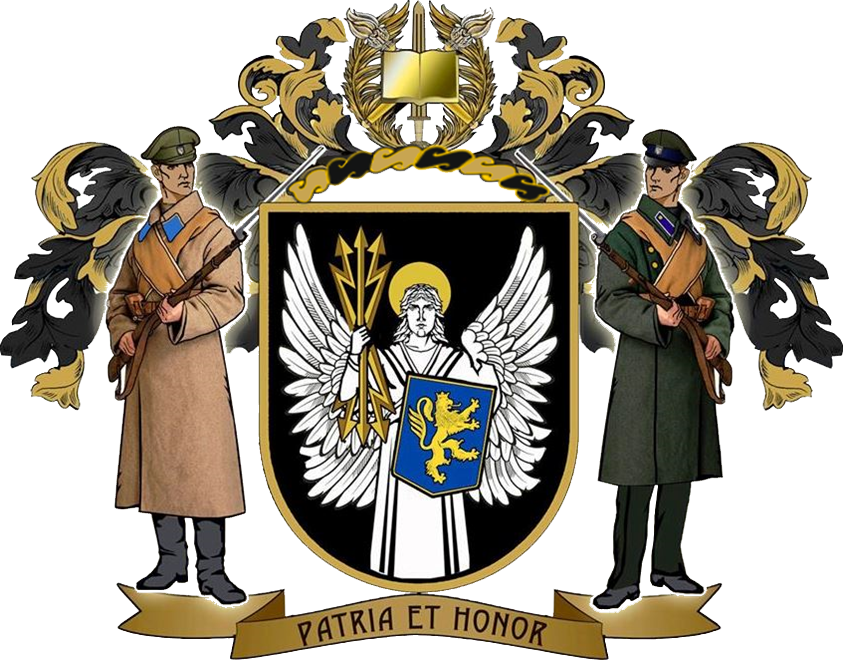
Emblem of institute

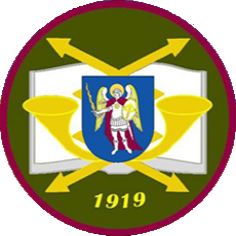
Emblem of institute

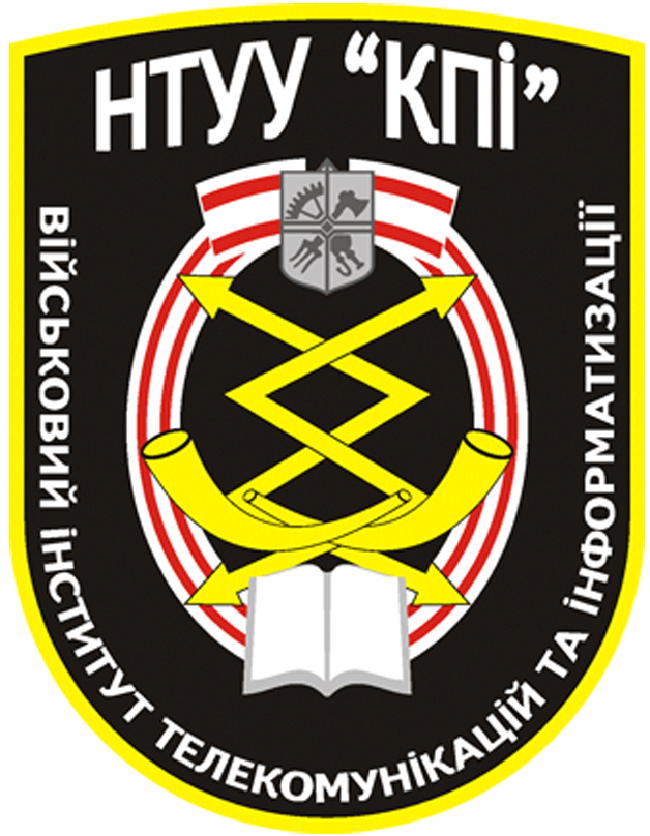
Former shoulder patch of institute as part of the KPI

The Military Institute of Telecommunication and Information Technologies named after the Heroes of Kruty (Ukrainian: Військовий інститут телекомунікацій та інформатизації імені Героїв Крут, romanized: Viyskovyi instytut telekomunikatsiy ta informatyzatsii) is an institution of higher military education in Ukraine and part of the State University of Telecommunications, located in Pechersk neighborhood of Kyiv. In the Soviet times (since 1965) it was known as the Kyiv Military Engineering College of Signal (Ukrainian: Київське вище військове інженерне училище зв'язку імені М. І. Калініна).

From 2001 – 2013, it was part of the Kyiv Polytechnic Institute. It is an important educational center for high-tech electronics and telecommunications and has a branch in Poltava.

== Historical outlook ==
=== Kiev Military School ===
The institute is located in the same building as the original city's school of cantonists that was built in Kyiv in 1839. In 1865 on decree of the Russian Emperor Alexander II, the school was transformed into the Kiev Infantry Cadet School. In 1897 it was renamed again into the Kiev Military School and just before World War I into the 1st Kiev Military School.

In the fall of 1915 it was renamed into the 1st Kiev Konstantinovskoye Military School in the memory of passed away Grand Duke Konstantin Konstantinovich of Russia. In November 1917 the school's students participated in extinguishing the Kiev Bolshevik Uprising as part of the city's garrison. In course of the event some 42 people of the school including staff and students died on the streets of Kyiv. After the power in the city transferred to the Central Council of Ukraine, some school personnel left the city for the Don Host Oblast and eventually with occupation of Ukraine by the Denikin's troops founded another school in Crimea in 1919, which was liquidated in 1920 by the Soviet regime.

=== First Military School of Khmelnytsky ===
In November 1917 the recently created 1st Ukrainian school of ensigns was transformed into the 1st Ukrainian Military School of Bohdan Khmelnytsky based on the former 1st Kiev Konstantinovskoye Military School. As the 1st Ukrainian Military School of Bohdan Khmelnytsky students under the command of Averkiy Honcharenko took part in the Battle of Kruty. Out of 200 students only 80 returned to Kyiv.

=== Soviet schools ===
After the defeat of Ukrainian forces, in 1920 in place of the former Konstantinovskoye school were quartered engineer classes that were created in Moscow back in 1919. On August 11, 1920, the Moscow Engineer classes were officially renamed into the 2nd Kiev Engineer classes. In 1921 the classes were renamed again into the 3rd Kiev Military Engineer School of Commanding staff. Once again the school changed its name in 1924 as the Kiev Military School of Communication and in 1926 was named in the memory of Mikhail Kalinin.

==== Kiev Military Radio-Technical Engineering College ====
The institute was founded back in Soviet times as "Kiev Higher Military Radio-Technical Engineering School" (Russian: Киевское высшее инженерное радиотехническое училище, КВИРТУ, abbreviated KVIRTU). This has also been referred to in Krasnaya Zvezda, via U.S. DOD documents, as the "Kiev Higher Engineering Radiotechnical School of Air Defence" of the Soviet Air Defence Forces.

The main compound of the institute was situated in Shevchenkivsky district of Kyiv (Melnikova str. 81). The compound was occupied by military education facilities as early as in late 19th century.

== Notable graduates of the Institute ==
- Volodymyr Salsky, a Minister of Defense of Ukraine
- Anton Denikin, a leader of the Russian White movement
- Oleksiy Halkin, a Minister of Defense of Ukraine
- Mykola Melnychenko, a communications protection agent for President Leonid Kuchma, notable figure of modern Ukrainian history
- Oleksandr Tretiakov, Ukrainian businessman and politician, aide to President Viktor Yuschenko

== List of battles ==
List of battles in which students of the institute or previous institutes took part.

- Kiev Bolshevik Uprising (1917) as the Kiev Konstantinovskoye Military School
- Battle of Kruty (1918) as the 1st Ukrainian military school of Bohdan Khmelnytsky

== September 3, 2024 missile strike ==
During the Russian invasion of Ukraine the Poltava facility was hit by two Russian ballistic missiles on 3 September 2024 that partially destroyed a building and killed at least 58 people and injured at least 328 others.

== See also ==
- Aerorozvidka
- Military academy
- Military of Ukraine
- Signals (military)
- Soviet education
