= Nesi =

Nesi, Nesis or NESI may refer to:

== Science and technology ==
- NESI (Net-centric Enterprised Solutions for Interoperability), a joint effort between the US Navy and USAF
- Northeast Snowfall Impact Scale (NESIS), created to measure snowstorms in the US Northeast
- New Zealand eScience Infrastructure (NeSI), a specialised platform of shared high performance computing

== People ==
- Nasi (mummy), a mummy in Biblioteca Museu Víctor Balaguer
- Giovanni Nesi (1456–1506), Florentine philosopher
- Nerio Nesi (1925–2024), Italian politician, businessman and banker
- Giovanni Nesi (born 1986), Italian pianist and professor of academic music
- Alexander Nesis (born 1962), founder, president and CEO of the ICT Group, a private equity firm headquartered in Moscow
- Luiz Ferreira Nesi, Brazilian footballer

== Other uses ==
- Nesi, a 2009 Indian Tamil film
- the ancient Roman port of Nesis, now called Nisida

== See also ==
- Nessie, the Loch Ness Monster, in Scottish folklore
- Nasi (Hebrew title)
- Nes (disambiguation)
