= International Command and Control Research and Technology Symposium =

Scientific conference

The International Command and Control Research and Technology Symposium (ICCRTS) is one of the world's premier scientific conferences on topics related to command and control (C2), from both a theoretical and practical point of view. It is the only major conference with C2 as its exclusive focus. The symposium has had papers not only on C2 in military contexts, but also in civilian ones such as disaster relief.

ICCRTS has been widely attended by scientists and practitioners from the United States and a number of NATO countries, most commonly Canada, the United Kingdom, the Netherlands, and Turkey, but others as well. Regular participants have also come from Australia, Brazil, Finland, and Singapore.

The symposium publishes proceedings with full-length, peer-reviewed scientific papers.

== Evolution and current status ==
ICCRTS began in the 1990s as a program within Command and Control Research Program (CCRP) funded by the United States Department of Defense (DoD).

Since 2015, the symposium has been operated by The International Command and Control Institute (IC2I), which also maintains archives of its publications. A number of papers, particularly by U.S. authors, are also available to the public through the U.S. Defense Technical Information Center (DTIC).

At its peak in 2009–2011 ICCRTS had several hundred participants. However, the loss of explicit funding support from the United States Department of Defense in 2015 nearly killed the symposium. That year it had to be cancelled, even though people had already written and submitted their papers. The papers were nevertheless published in the Proceedings, and since 2016 under the aegis of the IC2I, the symposium has bounced back and stabilized, although at lower levels of participation than it enjoyed between 2009 and 2011.

== Details of past symposia ==
Note that in earlier years, two symposia were sometimes held: the international one, known as ICCRTS; and a U.S. domestic one, known as CCRTS (Command and Control Research and Technology Symposium). The first ICCRTS in 1995 was in the United States and was modest in size (63 participants), with only a handful of non-U.S. participants. The 1996, 1997, and 1998 meetings were held in the United Kingdom, the United States, and Sweden, respectively.

Below are details of the meetings since 1999:

- 4th ICCRTS: Held at U.S. Naval War College, Rhode Island, US. June 29 – July 1, 1999
- 5th ICCRTS: Held at Australia War Memorial, Canberra ACT, Australia. 24–26 October 2000
- 6th ICCRTS: "Collaboration in the Information Age". Held at United States Naval Academy, Annapolis, MD, US, 19–21 June 2001.
- 7th ICCRTS: "Enabling Synchronized Operations". Held in Quebec City, Quebec, Canada, 16–20 September 2002.
- CCRTS 2002: "Transformation Through Experimentation". Held at U.S. Naval Postgraduate School, Monterey, California, US, 11–13 June 2002.
- 8th ICCRTS: "Information Age Transformation". Held at National Defense University, Washington, D.C., US, 17–19 June 2003.
- CCRTS 2004: "Power of Information Age Concepts and Technologies". Held in San Diego, California, US, 15–17 June 2004.
- 9th ICCRTS:"Coalition Transformation: An Evolution of People, Processes, and Technology to Enhance Interoperability". Held in Copenhagen, Denmark, 14–16 September 2004.
- 10th ICCRTS: "The Future of Command and Control". Held in McLean, Virginia, US, 13–16 June 2005.
- CCRTS 2006: "State of the Art and the State of the Practice". Held in San Diego, California, US, 20–22 June 2006.
- 11th ICCRTS: "Coalition Command and Control in the Networked Era". Held in Cambridge, United Kingdom, 26–28 September 2006.
- 12th ICCRTS: "Adapting Command and Control for the 21st Century". 18–21 June 2007.
- 13th ICCRTS: "C2 for Complex Endeavors". Held at the Meydenbauer Center, Bellevue, Washington, US, 17–19 June 2008.
- 14th ICCRTS: "C2 and Agility". Held at the Omni Shoreham Hotel, Washington, D.C., US, 15–17 June 2009.
- 15th ICCRTS: "The Evolution Of C2: Where Have We been? Where Are We going?". Held at Fairmont Miramar Hotel & Bungalows, Santa Monica, California, US, 22–24 June 2010.
- 16th ICCRTS: "Collective C2 in Multinational Civil–Military Operations". Held at Loews Hôtel Le Concorde, Québec City, Québec, Canada, 21–23 June 2011.
- 17th ICCRTS: "Operationalizing C2 Agility". Held at George Mason University, Fairfax, Virginia, US, 19–21 June 2012.
- 18th ICCRTS: Held at Institute for Defense Analyses, Alexandria, Virginia, US, 19–21 June 2013.
- 19th ICCRTS: Held at Institute for Defense Analyses, Alexandria, Virginia, US, 17–19 June 2014.
- 20th ICCRTS: "C2, Cyber, and Trust". Papers were not presented, only published in the Proceedings (2015).
- 21st ICCRTS: "C2 in a Complex Connected Battlespace". Held in London, United Kingdom, 6–18 September 2016.
- 22nd ICCRTS: "Frontiers of C2". Held at University of Southern California Institute for Creative Technologies, Playa Vista, California, 6–18 November 2017.
- 23rd ICCRTS: "Multi-Domain C2". Held at Florida Institute for Human & Machine Cognition (IHMC), Pensacola, Florida, US, 6–9 November 2018.
- 24th ICCRTS: "Managing Cyber Risk to Mission". Held at Johns Hopkins University Applied Physics Laboratory, Laurel, Maryland, US, 29–31 October 2019.
- 25th ICCRTS: Virtual event held 2-6 and 9-13 November, 2020.
- 26th ICCRTS: "Artificial Intelligence, Automation and Autonomy: C2 Implications, Opportunities and Challenges." Virtual event held 18-22 and 25-28 October, 2021.
- 27th ICCRTS: Held at Université Laval, Québec City, Québec, Canada, 25–27 October 2022.
- 28th ICCRTS: "Drivers of Future C2." Held at Johns Hopkins University Applied Physics Laboratory, Laurel, Maryland, US, 28-30 November 2023.
- 29th ICCRTS (forthcoming): "Overcoming Barriers to Future C2." To be held 24-26 September 2024, London, UK.
