= Volodymyr Tsvil =

Ukrainian politician (born 1962)

Volodymyr Ivanovych Tsvil (Ukrainian: Володимир Іванович Цвiль, born 11 February 1962) is a Ukrainian public figure and a former Ukrainian Consul in Munich.

In 2002, Tsvil authored the book "In the Whirlpool of the Cassette Scandal: A Story Told by an Eyewitness," examining the "Cassette Scandal", later known as Kuchmagate. The scandal unfolded when recordings surfaced of then-President of Ukraine, Leonid Kuchma, allegedly ordering the kidnapping of independent journalist, Georgiy Gongadze, whose decapitated corpse had recently been found. These events triggered a political crisis in Ukraine, eventually leading to The Orange Revolution. Tsvil, being at the center of these events, provided a first-hand account in his book.

== Career ==
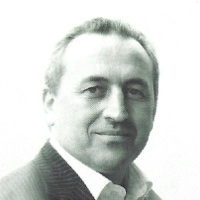
Volodymyr Tsvil

After finishing an eight-year school in Tomashivci, Ivano-Frankivsk region, Tsvil was accepted to Ivano-Frankivsk Medical College, from which he graduated in 1981. From 1981 to 1983 he served in the Soviet Army (Air Force). In 1983, Tsvil got accepted to Ivano-Frankivsk Medical Institute from which he transferred to Lviv Medical Institute, which Tsvil finished in 1989, with a degree as a doctor-gynecologist.

After graduating from the Medical Institute, Tsvil worked at Lviv Perinatal Centre. In 1991, he became a deputy chief medical officer.

In 1992, Volodymyr Tsvil was approved to study at Ivan Franko State University in Lviv, from which he graduated in 1996.

Volodymyr Tsvil was a leader of a working group of young politicians that organised a reburial of Cardinal Josyf Slipyj from Rome to Lviv in St. George’s Cathedral in 1992.

In 1993, Tsvil became the candidate in Verkhovna Rada in the majority constituency of the Rivne region, and was also a delegate of the VI World Congress of Free Ukrainians (Toronto, Canada).

In 1993, Volodymyr Tsvil founded a "Dilova Galichina" company in Lviv.

From 1996, Tsvil studied at the Diplomatic Academy affiliated with the Ministry of Foreign Affairs of Ukraine. He finished the academy in 1998, majoring in International Law.

In 1998, Volodymyr Tsvil was a candidate in the Verkhovna Rada.

In 1999, Volodymyr Tsvil became a trusted person of the leader of the Socialist Party of Ukraine, Alexander Moroz, during the presidential election in Ukraine.

In 2000, Tsvil moved to Munich to work on an academic project at the "Ukrainian Free University".

Since 2000 Tsvil and his family have lived in Germany.

In 2002, Volodymyr Tsvil published his book "In the Whirlpool of the Cassette Scandal. A Story Told by Eyewitness", with Tsvil acting as a publicist of the book.

In 2002-2004 Volodymyr Tsvil was the Ukrainian Councillor in Munich.

In 2004, Tsvil founded «O.M. Osteuropaeishe Investitions GmbH», which subsequently became a part of TSVIL GROUP

Volodymyr Tsvil is married and has two children.

== Kuchmagate ==
On 28 November 2000, the leader of the Socialist Party of Ukraine, Oleksandr Moroz, released the audio recordings made in the office of the President of Ukraine to the Ukrainian media. The content of these recordings supposedly proved involvement of the President of Ukraine, Leonid Kuchma, and his associates, in a series of sensational crimes. One of these crimes was the murder of a journalist, Georgiy Gongadze. Consequently, "Cassette Scandal" loomed throughout all country, or as it was called in the West, Kuchmagate. As became known afterwards, the audio recordings released by Alexander Moroz were obtained from a major of the State Security, Mykola Melnychenko. After the scandal, Melnychenko acquired political asylum in the United States. Eminent scholars mentioned the role of Volodymyr Tsvil while writing about works on the tape affair. Among many academics were: Dr Taras Kuzio, professor of the Institute of European, Russian and Eurasian Studies in George Washington University, as well as Jaroslaw Koshiw, author of "Beheaded. The killing of a Journalist" Volodymyr Tsvil was the first to describe the chronology of Kuchmagate in his book "In the Whirlpool of the Cassette Scandal. A Story Told by Eyewitness" in 2002. Consequently, Volodymyr Tsvil published his book “Kuchmagate & the Collapse of the Orange idea” (translated in English). Author House UK became the official publisher of Tsvil's work. The book was significantly extended, providing descriptions of contemporary events in Ukraine which happened in the aftermath of the “cassette scandal” and the Orange Revolution, up to early 2013 and the precursors of a new turmoil in Ukraine. Over time, the book was supplemented by new facts and events. The Publishing House of the Kyiv-Mohyla Academy has released in 2018 a newest book by Volodymyr Tsvil «Kuchmagate. Behind the Scenes of the Cassette Scandal»

== Ecology ==
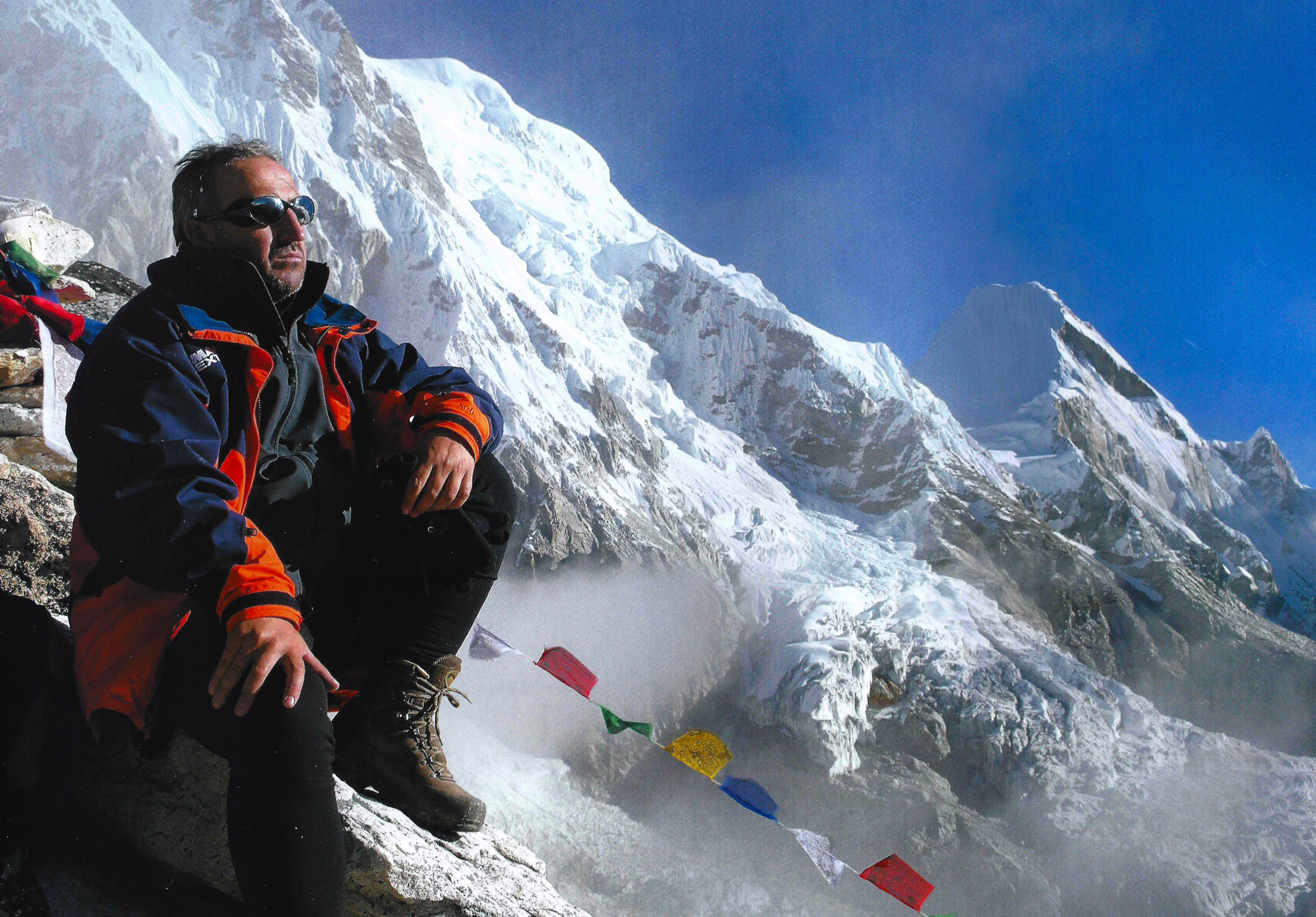
Volodymyr Tsvil in Nepal mountains.

Volodymyr Tsvil, as plenipotentiary of the Ministry of Foreign Affairs of Ukraine, arranged to have Helmut Kohl awarded with an Honorary Doctorate Diploma of the Ukrainian State Forestry University (the award ceremony was conducted in Berlin in the Deutsche Parlamentarische Gesellschaft, on 4 December 2012). Volodymyr Tsvil organised this ceremony as part of his work to promote ecological causes worldwide, since Helmut Kohl was the person who initiated a review of the first World Environmental Constitution while he was the German Chancellor in 1997. Volodymyr Tsvil promoted his environmentalist activities in Nepal, Greenland, Kamchatka, and in other regions.

== Real Estate ==
Volodymyr Tsvil started realisation of the project which entailed the construction of a unique five-star hotel for children, Kinderhotel St. Gallenkirch in Alps, together with St. Gallenkirch mayor, Ewald Tschanhenz . The idea of the hotel is unique, because it creates an absolutely new environment for children. Moreover, not only children of rich parents would be able to go to the hotel, but also young and talented children. An emphasis in the study programme is placed particularly on learning foreign languages, sciences and computer technologies.

== Unknown Kandinsky ==
Volodymyr Tsvil has lived in Germany since 2000. Coincidentally, his house is situated on Lake Starnberg, near Murnau, where the Russian artist Wassily Kandinsky lived and worked. The descendants of Gabriele Münter, who was a common law wife of Kandinsky, became the inheritors of paintings of the artist, which Kandinsky left to Gabriele Münter. Being aware of Volodymyr Tsvil’s reputation as a businessman and a publicist, they addressed him with a request to search for the lost paintings. After years of searching, the history of every painting became known. On 11 July 2012, Volodymyr Tsvil met the representatives of the Ministry of Culture of the Russian Federation, where the question of returning the cultural legacy of Kandinsky back to Russia, was discussed. Nowadays, an estimated value of the 10 discovered paintings totals €34,200,000.

In January 2013, Volodymyr Tsvil finished work on a book, "Unknown Kandinsky", in co-authorship with Professor Dmitry Gorbachev , who is an expert of avant-garde art. The book contains twelve novels, each of which throws light on previously neglected periods in the biography of the famous artist, Vasiliy Kandinsky.

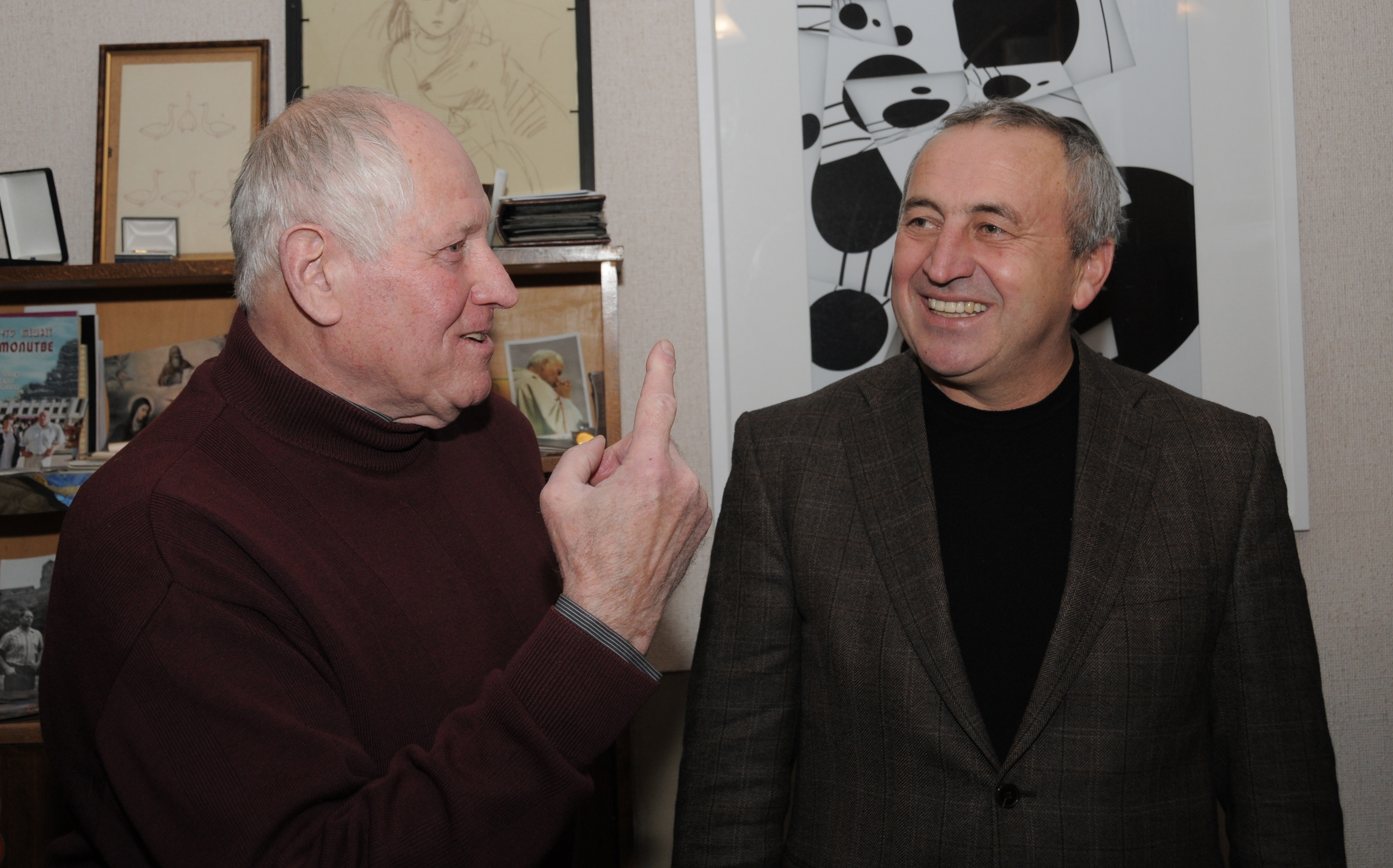
Dmitry Gorbachev and Volodymyr Tsvil, January 2013

"The sales analysis for the last ten years indicates that Kandinsky’s paintings of 20 and 30cm size are sold, on average, for a price ranging from $300,000 to $600,000. His abstract works on paper painted with ink, pencil and watercolors, are in the lower price segment, sold between around $30,000 and $60,000. During the Christie’s auction in New York on 5 February 2009, for instance, the illustration to Kandinsky’s own book, "Point and line to plane", exceeded by three times the original estimate of the work, and was sold for more than $40,000. Some of Kandinsky’s watercolor works, which were preserved in a good condition and had precise dating, could be more expensive than fine art paintings. If the subject and the date of these works revealed that it belonged to one of the remarkable moments in the author’s creative evolution, its price could rise dramatically. In 2005, Kandinsky’s work, "Sketch for the composition IV", (created in 1911 at the same time as The Blue Rider group was founded), raised almost $507,000 on the Hauswedell & Nolte auction in Hamburg, while the original estimate amounted to $180,000. If the auction statistics are analyzed in the period between 2001 and 2009, the price index of Kandinsky’s fine art has increased 4.5 times, while the price for his drawings has increased 5.6 times. The last major sale of Kandinsky’s works in November 2012, during the Christie’s auction in New York City, has confirmed the trend. The "Sketch for the composition No.8" was sold for $23 million, and has finally beaten the artist’s own record, which remained for the sale of "Fuga" for 22 years". (excerpt from the novel "From junkyard to Sotheby’s" from the book "Unknown Kandinsky").

The release of "Unknown Kandinsky" is scheduled for mid-2013, in German and Ukrainian.
