= Deployable Joint Command and Control =

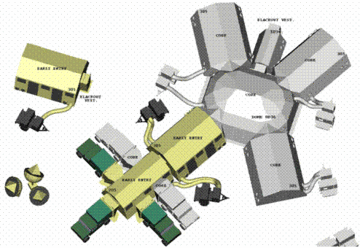
Drawing of the DJC2 Core, which can support up to 60 users

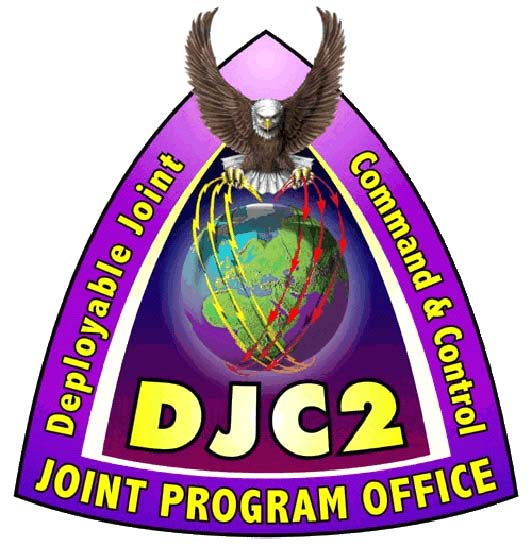
DJC2 Program logo

The Deployable Joint Command and Control system, commonly known as DJC2, is an integrated military command and control headquarters system which enables a commander to set up a self-contained, self-powered, computer network-enabled temporary headquarters facility anywhere in the world within 6 – 24 hours of arrival at a location.

DJC2 is produced and fielded by the U.S. military to support Joint warfare. The DJC2 Joint Program Office developed the system, and it is integrated and produced by a U.S. Government integrator, the Naval Surface Warfare Center Panama City Division.

The base DJC2 system consists of a linked group of self-powered and climate-controlled tents which house computer network servers, computer workstations with furniture, satellite communications equipment, voice and data encryption equipment, a video teleconferencing system, video display screens, printers, fax machines, etc. Utilizing a fielded DJC2 system, the commander and his staff can securely communicate across the world, send and receive information across five different computer networks (including secure networks and the Internet), participate in video teleconferences with remote locations, and use a fully integrated command and control/collaboration software tool suite to plan and execute missions.

In addition to the base system, DJC2 includes some additional specialized configurations designed to support a commander's need for command and control capabilities in specialized circumstances. These configurations include: a "suitcase" communications suite which can be hand-carried and used on short notice by a first responder/small control team; and a small, air-certified headquarters suite which can operate aboard a military aircraft while in flight. The DJC2 system also includes an experimental concept demonstration suite with DJC2 workstations installed in shipboard containers for operation aboard a ship while underway.

Currently, the Department of Defense has produced and fielded six fully deployable DJC2 systems to commands in the United States and Europe. A DJC2 system was used in a Joint Task Force effort supporting the relief efforts in the immediate aftermath of Hurricane Katrina in New Orleans, Louisiana, as well as in the Joint Task Force providing humanitarian assistance and disaster relief to victims of the May 2008 Cyclone Nargis in Myanmar (Burma). The DJC2 systems have also been used in military exercises around the world, including the United States, Europe, Africa, Central America, and Asia.

== Design ==
=== Subsystems ===
The DJC2 design provides the capabilities of its four configurations by integrating components from three different subsystems:

- Infrastructure Support (IS) – Includes such components as climate-controlled tents; generators for power; environmental control units for heating/cooling; furniture for workstations; framework for mounting tools such as large video display screens; lighting, etc.
- Information Technology (IT) – Includes such components as laptop workstations with network connectivity and desktop peripherals; five different networks (including a combination of secure and non-secure) with supporting computer servers; command and control software applications, including the Department of Defense's standardized command and control suite, Global Command and Control – Joint (GCCS-J); collaboration software applications, an online portal which provides access to software applications and data; voice communications; video display technology with large screen displays; video teleconferencing; cryptographic components and other information assurance (security) tools, etc.
- Communications – Includes such components as satellite dishes, radios, communications interfaces, etc.

=== Architecture ===
The DJC2 command and control architecture is an open architecture based on Service Oriented Architecture principles. The architecture utilizes several technologies – including Internet Protocol Convergence (IPC) and virtualization – to reconcile the DJC2 system's robust IT requirements (i.e., five different networks, C2 and collaboration software applications, and communications) with its stringent deployability and rapid set-up requirements.

The DJC2 system's IPC Suite uses IPC technology to provide IP-based services and flexible bandwidth utilization. The system uses virtualization technology in both hardware (computer servers) and software. Virtualization of the DJC2 hardware allows one DJC2 computer server to do the job of multiple servers by creating "virtual machines" (VMs) that can run their own operating systems and applications just like a "real" server, and then can be hosted with many other VMs on one physical server to more effectively utilize computer server capacity. Virtualization of the DJC2 software allows for better portability of applications to differing hardware sets. Through virtualization, the DJC2 program reduced the size of its system (e.g., reducing the number of servers per network from an original nine to three plus one spare), which decreases both the amount of space required for the system to be set up (footprint) and the transportation assets needed to transport it (lift), as well as decreased cost and set-up time.

=== Refresh ===
The DJC2 program is currently in its Technology Refresh and Technology Insertion phase, which will include inserting such technologies as Secure Wireless Networking into the existing DJC2 systems.

== Configurations ==
The DJC2 system includes four distinct DJC2 configurations, each designed to meet different mission needs ranging from the mission of a two-person first responder team up to the mission of a major Joint Task Force.

=== Core ===
The baseline configuration of the DJC2 system is the Core configuration, which enables a commander to rapidly deploy a fully capable temporary command and control headquarters. The Core is a 60-operator suite housed in tents which can be set up and fully operational with communications and network connectivity in less than 24 hours after arrival on-site. Each operator workstation includes two laptops to provide an operator with simultaneous access to two networks, and telephone and intercom capability. The Core is flexible and scalable, and can be tailored to an individual mission (i.e., a commander can take only what he needs for a particular mission and leave the rest behind).

The DJC2 Core can support a small Joint Task Force, or can be combined with other Cores to support a larger Joint Task Force. Though the Core provides physical space and workstations for 60 operator workstations, its computer servers can support more than 750 simultaneous users, so additional non-DJC2 computers can be connected to the DJC2 system when needed. Though the Core has organic communications capabilities, establishing a full Core requires supplemental communications support at the site, such as that provided by a military communications unit. The Core has its own generators for power and environmental control units for heating/cooling. However, it can be connected to external power when available. It also can be set up inside an available building instead of the tents.

=== Early Entry ===
Embedded within the Core is the Early Entry configuration, which enables a commander to deploy an early (first 72–96 hours) command and control presence and develop situational awareness at a location prior to setting up a full temporary headquarters (when needed). The Early Entry configuration is a 20/40-operator suite, housed in just two of the Core's rectangular tents, which can be set up and providing limited communications and network connectivity within 4 – 6 hours of arrival at a location. When the rest of the Core arrives, it can be quickly connected to the Early Entry components to provide full Core functionality within 24 hours. Like the Core, the Early Entry configuration has its own generators for power and environmental control units for heating/cooling, but can be connected to external power when available. It also can be set up inside an available building instead of the tents.

=== En Route ===
The En Route configuration is a stand-alone DJC2 suite which enables the commander to establish and sustain effective command and control and situational awareness while traveling by air from the garrison headquarters to a deployed location. It provides 6 – 12 workstations, mounted to a special aircraft pallet, which allow operators to communicate, connect to two networks (one secure and one non-secure), and perform command and control functions while in flight on a C-130 or C-17 aircraft. Specially designed "roller carts" house the primary networking and communications equipment and at least one system administrator position to manage the network and communication interfaces. The En Route configuration can be marshaled from short-term storage and ready for aircraft installation within 3 hours of notification. The workstations are also operable on the ground, and onboard while the aircraft is on the flight line. The En Route configuration requires an external power source, such as power from the aircraft.

=== Rapid Response Kit ===
The Rapid Response Kit is a stand-alone DJC2 suite which enables a commander to deploy a lightweight communications package anywhere in the world at a moment's notice by a very small team carrying it on a military or commercial aircraft. The Rapid Response Kit supports 2 – 15 operators. It has no computer servers; instead, it "reaches back" electronically to established U.S. Department of Defense networks via satellite connectivity. It provides two networks simultaneously, chosen from among four network options, including both secure and non-secure networks. It provides both voice and data communications, as well as a video teleconferencing capability. The Rapid Response Kit requires an external power source, such as commercial power from a building. It can also connect to other networks, such as a network in a commercial hotel.

=== Maritime Demonstrator ===
In partnership with the U.S. Navy Second Fleet, the DJC2 program has also produced and demonstrated a prototype configuration of a Joint Task Force headquarters afloat command and control capability, called the DJC2 Maritime Demonstrator. The demonstrator is a totally self-contained Joint Task Force Headquarters suite which can be installed aboard a ship. It requires nothing from the ship other than physical space, electrical power, and hotel services for the command staff. The demonstrator (which is a repackaging of the DJC2 architecture) consists of a group of climate-controlled ISO containers of two types: Staff Modules, which house 10 operator workstations per container; and Tech Control Modules, which house the networking, communications, and video distribution hardware that supports the operators.

The ISO containers are secured for sea using normal ship's tie-down points in any appropriate open space. The design also includes satellite communication antennas for connectivity to DISA's Global Information Grid. This connectivity may also be provided via the ship's organic satellite communications system. The demonstrator, which has been successfully tested, can easily be scaled larger when the mission requires it by adding more ISO containers of each type. In addition, the C2 architecture is sufficiently robust to support a large number of additional external users in other ship spaces (e.g., embarked unit spaces). The demonstrator can be installed on a designated ship of opportunity – including Navy, Military Sealift Command, Maritime Pre-Positioning Force Units, Coalition Force ships – or ashore. Since it is self-contained and easy to install/uninstall, it can be moved as needed among ships and installed wherever space and power are available.

== Users ==
The DJC2 system is fielded to U.S. Combatant Commands and/or their component commands for their use in standing up Joint Task Forces in response to military and humanitarian crises. Currently, the commands that own a DJC2 system include: U.S. Southern Command; U.S. Pacific Command; U.S. European Command; Southern European Task Force/U.S. Army Africa; U.S. Army South, and III Marine Expeditionary Force.

The DJC2 system's command and control capabilities also have utility for non-military applications such as supporting Homeland Security efforts responding to natural disasters. As noted, DJC2 was used in a Joint Task Force supporting the rescue and relief effort in the aftermath of Hurricane Katrina on the U.S. Gulf Coast and of Cyclone Nargis in Myanmar (Burma).

=== Certifications ===
The DJC2 system is a fully tested, fully certified U.S. military system. Its certifications include:

- Transportability (air, sea, road, and rail)
- Information Assurance
- Joint Interoperability
- Authority to Operate
