= Marius Vassiliou =

American computer scientist

- Born: 1957 (age 68–69)
- Citizenship: USA
- Education: Harvard University; California Institute of Technology (PhD); University of Southern California (Masters Comp Sci); UCLA (MBA)
- Known for: Command and Control; Network-centric organization History of petroleum Fast Multipole Method; United States Army Research Laboratory Federated Laboratory; Earthquake energy and Depth Distribution
- Scientific career
- Fields: Computational Physics, Geophysics, Computational Science
- Workplaces: Rockwell International Corporation

Marius Vassiliou (born 1957) is an American computational scientist, geophysicist, and aerospace executive. He is also an authority on the history of petroleum. Vassiliou is of Greek Cypriot descent and was educated at Harvard University and the California Institute of Technology (PhD).

== Career ==
In geophysics, he is best known for his explanations of the depth distribution of earthquakes, and for his direct (non-Magnitude-based) calculations of earthquake energy release. Vassiliou has also been cited for his experimental work on solids at high pressures and temperatures. In 2009, he published the Historical Dictionary of the Petroleum Industry, which went into a Second Edition in 2018. In the broader field of computational physics, Vassiliou is known for the introduction of Rokhlin's fast multipole method to computational electromagnetics.

As an executive at the Rockwell International Corporation, he was also well known as the leader of the U. S. Army Research Laboratory's Advanced Displays Federated Laboratory Consortium in the late 1990s and early 2000s, making advances in the interaction of humans with displays. The work in augmented reality included early development of the types of technologies that would later be applied to such platforms as google glass.

In later years, as an analyst advising the U.S. Government, he wrote influential papers on Command, Control, and Communications, including some with David Alberts, and published the book C2 Re-envisioned: the Future of the Enterprise, which has also been translated into Chinese.

In 2022, Vassiliou, along with professor Mir-Yusif Mir-Babayev, published the book US and Azerbaijani Oil in the Nineteenth Century: The Two Titans, which covers the early period of the petrochemical age, when the United States and Azerbaijan were responsible for 97% of the world's oil production.
