= Janes Information Services =

Open-source intelligence company

Janes
- Parent company: Montagu Private Equity
- Status: Active
- Founded: 1898
- Founder: Fred T. Jane
- Country of origin: England
- Headquarters location: Croydon
- Key people: Blake Bartlett (CEO)
- Publication types: Databases, information, books, periodicals
- Nonfiction topics: Military, defence, national security, aerospace, transportation, open-source intelligence
- Official website: janes.com

Janes Information Services, commonly known as Janes, is a global open-source intelligence company specialising in military, national security, aerospace, and transport topics. Its name derives from British author Fred T. Jane.

== History ==
Janes was founded in 1898 by Fred T. Jane, who had begun sketching ships as a naval artist while living in Portsmouth. This culminated in the publication of Jane's All The World's Fighting Ships (1898). Janes gradually branched out into other areas of military expertise. The books and trade magazines published by the company have become the de facto source of public information on warfare and transportation systems.

Based in Greater London for most of its existence, the company was owned by the Thomson Corporation, the Woodbridge Company, and then IHS Markit, before being acquired by Montagu Private Equity in 2019.

In March 2022, Janes acquired Washington, D.C.-based RWR Advisory Group.

== Description ==
The company name is officially Janes Defense, and it is as of 2025 located in Croydon. The company continues to provide open-source intelligence in the defence, security, aerospace, and transport sectors.

== Publications ==
Of their publications, books (published annually) include Jane's All the World's Aircraft, Jane's Fighting Ships, Jane's Military Communications, Jane's World Air Forces, Jane's World Navies, and Jane's World Railways. Periodicals include Jane's Defence Weekly, Jane's Intelligence Review, Jane's International Defence Review, and Jane's Navy International. Jane's Police Review (2011) and Jane's Airport Review (2019) were discontinued.

=== Jane's Airport Review ===
IHS Jane's Airport Review (part of Jane's Information Group) is, as of 2019 a defunct magazine. It was recognised by the airport and air traffic control industries as a source for reporting on global market developments. The magazine was established in 2011, and was published eight times a year. The headquarters was in Coulsdon, Greater London.

The review included business news and analysis covering airport infrastructure, aviation security, air traffic control and airspace management, ramp handling, and terminal and ground support equipment. Reports covered editorial briefings, policy issues, market analysis, finance and new product development, as well as profiles on individual companies.

In June 2015, the circulation of Jane's Airport Review was 11,379 copies. Jane's All the World's Aircraft and Fighting Ships are included in the 2019 edition of the AP stylebook as references for proper notation of aircraft and military ship names.

Jane's Combat Simulations was a brand of computer flight simulation games and naval warfare simulations produced between 1996 and 2000 under licence to Electronic Arts (EA).
