= NESI =

Net-centric Enterprised Solutions for Interoperability (NESI) is a joint effort between the United States Navy’s Program Executive Office for C4I & Space and the United States Air Force’s Electronic Systems Center. It provides implementation guidance which facilitates the design, development, maintenance, evolution, and use of information systems for the Net-Centric Operations and Warfare (NCOW) environment. NESI has also been provided to other Department of Defense (DoD) services and agencies for potential adoption.

NESI comprises six parts, each focusing on a specific area of guidance. NESI provides guidance, best practices, and examples for developing Net-Centric software. The overall goal is to provide common, cross-service guidance in basic terms for the program managers and developers of net-centric solutions. The objective is not to replace or repeat existing direction, but to help translate into concrete actions the plethora of mandated and sometimes contradictory guidance on the topic of net-centric compliance and standards.

== NESI documentation ==
NESI subsumes two now obsolete references; in particular, the Air Force C2 Enterprise Technical Reference Architecture (C2ERA) and the Navy Reusable Applications Integration and Development Standards (RAPIDS). Initial authority for NESI is per the Memorandum of Agreement between Space and Naval Warfare Systems Command (SPAWAR), Navy PEO C4I & Space and the United States Air Force Electronic Systems Center, dated 22 December 2003, Subject: Cooperation Agreement for Net-Centric Solutions for Interoperability (NESI). This guidance will continue to evolve as direction and understanding of the requirements of net-centricity evolve. NESI will be updated to reflect changes to the guiding documents and new regulations.

=== Parts ===
The NESI documentation, a six-part information set, is available as PDF files. These parts consist of:

1. Overview: Introduction and vision
2. ASD/NII Checklist Guidance: "How to implement" guidance
3. Migration Guidance: Guidance for maintenance/upgrade activities leading to net-centric systems
4. Node Design Guidance: Guidance for developing nodes and their infrastructure to support net-centric services
5. Developer's/Technical Guidance: Detailed development guidance focusing on new starts and major updates
6. Acquisition Guidance: Incorporating NESI during the acquisition process

==== Technical guidance ====
- Complementary to GIG/NCES infrastructure;
- Tied to net-centric objectives such as interoperability and flexibility;
- Vendor, program, platform, and service neutral;
- Focused on decoupling stovepipe systems into services (e.g., SOA and web services).

==== *Acquisition guidance* ====
- Is intended for program managers and DoD contractors;
- Outlines process and system/product requirements;
- Relates the steps of the System Acquisition Framework.

==== Evaluation checklist ====
In order to evaluate programs/projects, NESI has developed a technical checklist. The current version of the checklist should be used to analyze the current status of a program/project. The technical checklist is produced from the guidance details and provides public, published, consistent interpretation of NESI guidance. Overall, the checklist will provide a uniform interpretation for all of participating organizations.

=== Component definitions ===
- Perspective: provides a way to encapsulate information, based on subject areas.
- Guidance Detail: provides measurable requirements and rationale for net-centricity and interoperability.
- Best Practice: provides advice on net-centricity and interoperability.
- Examples: demonstrate application of guidance and best practices net-centricity and interoperability.
- References: provides further information about guidance, best practices and examples
- Glossary: defines terms that are used in Perspectives, Guidance Details, Best Practice Details and Examples.
