= Department of Defense Discovery Metadata Specification =

The Department of Defense Discovery Metadata Specification (DoD Discovery Metadata Specification or DDMS) is a Net-Centric Enterprise Services (NCES) metadata initiative. DDMS is loosely based on the Dublin Core vocabulary. DDMS defines discovery metadata elements for resources posted to community and organizational shared spaces. It is sometimes (incorrectly) referred to as DoD Discovery Metadata Standard. The project focuses both on the process of developing a central taxonomy for metadata, and defining a way of discovering resources by their metadata using that taxonomy.

The DDMS was created in support of the DoD Net-Centric Data Strategy (dated May 9, 2003), and specifies a set of information fields that are to be used to describe any data or service asset that is made known to the DoD Enterprise. The elements in the DDMS are designed to be platform, language, and implementation-independent, and the specification is described with an XML Schema.

The DDMS is currently on version 5.0 released on January 14, 2013. This is the first version to recast DDMS within the bounds of the Intelligence Community's Trusted Data Format specification. In this paradigm, the DDMS metacard is not a standalone top-level construct. Instead, it is a single assertion which decorates a Trusted Data Object, and which is incomplete on its own. DDMS 5.0 also replaces the Geography Markup Language (GML) profile for geospatial information with Time-Space Position Information v2.0 (TSPI).

DDMS 5.0 requires TDF V2 and associated IC specifications (ISM V10, NTK V8, VIRT V1).

== Structure ==
The DDMS is designed using a layered approach, combining a Core Layer and an Extensible Layer surrounded by the DDMS Resource Header. The Core Layer is composed of five sets of element categories, each with a specific functional focus for describing a data asset:

- The Metacard elements describe the DDMS resource itself.
- The Security elements enable the description of security classification of the described resource, Need-to-Know (NTK) information, and related notices.
- The Resource elements enable the description of maintenance and administration information.
- The Summary Content elements enable the description of concepts and topics.
- The Format elements enable the description of physical attributes of the asset.
- The Extensible Layer is designed to support domain-specific or Community of Interest (COI) discovery metadata requirements, and can be used to extend the element categories identified in the Core Layer. Extensions are expected to be registered in the DoD Metadata Registry. Extensible attribute spaces are also provided on some elements.

== Earlier versions ==
- DDMS Version 4.1 (released June 12, 2012)
- DDMS Version 4.0.1 (released November 18, 2011)
- DDMS Version 4.0 (released September 22, 2011)
- DDMS Version 3.1 (released July 5, 2011)
- DDMS Version 3.0.1 (released March 4, 2011, documentation update only)
- DDMS Version 3.0 (released September 2, 2010)
- DDMS Version 3.0 Pre-Release (released January 2010, pending ICISM modification).
- DDMS Version 2.0 (released July 17, 2008)
- DDMS Version 1.4 (released July 1, 2007)
- DDMS Version 1.3 (released July 29, 2005)
- DDMS Version 1.2 (released January 3, 2005)
- DDMS Version 1.1 (released July 1, 2004)
- DDMS Version 1.0 (released September 29, 2003)

Major version releases contain changes which break backwards compatibility with earlier versions.
