= Melnychenko =

Melnychenko (Ukrainian: Мельниченко) or Melnichenko is a surname of Ukrainian-language origin. Derived from мельник, it means descendant of a miller. It is common in Ukraine, Russia, and Belarus. Notable people with the surname include:

- Anastasia Melnichenko (born 1984), Ukrainian activist
- Andrey Melnichenko (born 1972), Belarusian-Russian billionaire
- Hanna Melnychenko (born 1983), Ukrainian heptathlete
- Ilona Melnichenko, Ukrainian ice dancer for the Soviet Union
- Maksym Melnychenko (born 2005), Ukrainian footballer
- Mykola Melnychenko (born 1966), Ukrainian security service officer
- Serhii Melnychenko (born 1991), Ukrainian photographer, dancer
- Volodymyr Melnychenko (1931–2023), Ukrainian visual artist, sculptor and architect
- Yuriy Melnichenko (born 1972), Kazakhstani wrestler
