= Trusted Data Format =

- Open TDF icon
- Filename extension: .tdf
- Developed by: ODNI
- Latest release: 3.0; Sept 6, 2013
- Extended from: XML
- Website: DNI TDF Specification

The Trusted Data Format (TDF) is a data object encoding specification for the purposes of enabling data tagging and cryptographic security features. These features include assertion of data properties or tags, cryptographic binding and data encryption. The TDF is freely available with no restrictions and requires no use of proprietary or patented technology and is thus open for anyone to use.

== Overview ==
The TDF Specification is based on a Trusted Data Object (TDO) which can be grouped together into a Trusted Data Collection (TDC). Each TDO consists of a data payload which can be associated with an unlimited number of metadata objects. The TDO supports the cryptographic binding of the metadata objects to the payload data object. In addition, both data and metadata objects can be associated with a block of encryption information which is used by any TDF consumer to decrypt the associated data or metadata if it had been encrypted. A TDC allows for additional metadata objects to apply to a set of TDOs.

== Implementations ==
The United States Intelligence Community maintains the IC-TDF, which includes government-specific tagging requirements on top of the core TDF capabilities mentioned above, in an XML Data Encoding Specification.

The United States Department of Defense uses TDF to implement the Department of Defense Discovery Metadata Specification (DDMS).
