= Jane's Military Communications =

Jane's Military Communications is an annual reference book (also published online) covering military communications and advances in the equipment used by various armed forces. Published by Jane's Information Group, a subsidiary of IHS Inc., it purports to be "the most comprehensive military communications information resource available." The former European editor of the Journal of Electronic Defense, John Williamson, was appointed editor in 1984. Previously R. J. Raggett was the editor.

Rodney Cowton, Defence Correspondent of the Times reviewed Jane's Military Communications 1983. Mr Raggett provided shipboard communications analysis of the Falklands Conflict from the British perspective: facilities for shipboard information storage and processing too small; backlogs of up to 1,000 messages; rooms not large enough to handle increased people traffic of the war environment; Argentines were able to intercept insecure communications. In 1983 these problems were considered "inevitable" considering the volume of up to 250,000 messages. 'Bob' Raggett predicted in the introduction that, by 2000, "electronic systems could render a nuclear attack by an unfriendly power virtually impossible".

In 1983 the publication cost £55.00 (equivalent to £234.41 in 2023).

The 2011–2012 Yearbook, containing 2,500 images and 2,600 entries, was priced at £540.00 with online access costing £1,850.00.
