= Radio in a box =

Radio-in-a-box (RIAB) is a portable, economical broadcasting system containing a laptop, mixer, CD/Cassette player, digital audio recorder, microphones and equipment needed to establish a radio station in remote or disaster locations.

Army Reservist with RIAB

== History ==
In 2005, the Asia-Pacific Broadcasting Union (ABU), with the assistance from the United Nations Educational, Scientific, and Cultural Organization (UNESCO), began development of an economical, compact, and easily transportable radio system that could be employed in remote areas or in response to disasters. In response to the 2004 Indian Ocean earthquake and tsunami, Radio Netherlands Worldwide (RNW) developed a portable radio station in 20 ft shipping container. Due to the long transit time of shipping a container by ship, RNW developed a smaller, rapid response set that measures 80 cm X 70 cm X 70 cm and weighs approximately 15 kilograms.

== RIAB capabilities ==
RIAB systems differ in sizes. Some RIAB systems measure as small as 55 cm X 50 cm or as large as a twenty-foot shipping container. Once delivered to a designated site, RIAB systems may be operational within one hour. RIAB systems can be transported easily on airplanes or helicopters to reach remote areas or disaster areas to provide information to people on the ground. RIABs have a variety of transmitters that range in power from 30 watts to 1000 watts. RIAB systems may be static or mounted in a vehicle for mobile operations. Asia-Pacific Broadcasting Union (ABU) built a 30-watt radio-in-a-box system for approximately US$5000. The approximate annual cost of establishing and maintaining a RIAB in Afghanistan is $27,000.

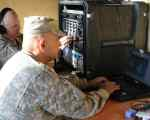
Army National Guardsmen operating a RIAB

== Civilian application ==
Radio-in-a-box systems have been employed in disaster areas where broadcasting infrastructure has been destroyed in order to provide those affected with much needed information. Radio Netherlands Worldwide (RNW) delivered one RIAB system to Padang, Indonesia following the September 30, 2009 earthquake, one RIAB system to Haiti following the January 12, 2010 earthquake and two RIAB systems to Chile following the February 27, 2010 earthquake. Additional radio-in-a-box systems have been delivered to eight countries in Africa, Bhutan, India, Jamaica, and Tonga.

== United States military employment in Afghanistan ==
Radio is the dominant information tool to reach wide audiences in isolated, mountainous regions. The US military has deployed RIABs throughout Afghanistan in order to communicate with the residents. Due to a 70 percent illiteracy rate and lack of education in Afghanistan radio is a vital communications tool used to broadcast information where radio ownership exceeds 80 percent. The United States military operates approximately 100 RIABs and hire local Afghan DJs in Afghanistan to broadcast information and host call-in shows. The United States Army employed RIAB systems to broadcast anti-Taliban and anti-Al Qaeda messages and countered Taliban propaganda by pushing onto Taliban frequencies in Paktia Province. One advantage of employing RIAB systems is the ability to broadcast vital information immediately to a large audience in the event of a crisis. One Afghan DJ has 50,000 listeners. Nawa District Governor Abdul Manaf uses the local RIAB station to conduct weekly call-in shows and believes the RIAB system is one of his best communication tools to inform a large audience. In Afghanistan's Paktika province, which has a literacy rate of two percent, an estimated 92 percent of the residents listen to the radio every day. Radio programs transmitted using RIAB systems provide beneficial information to Afghan farmers in remote areas. In the isolated, mountainous Wazi Kwah district of Paktika Province, a RIAB system supplies the only source of outside news. Afghan National Army commanders use the RIAB to communicate to villagers and elders and provide thoughts to the community. Afghans trust messages from the United States military that explain important information such as what to do when a military convoy approaches and agriculture programs. For general news, Afghans prefer other outlets of information such as the BBC or VOA because RIAB systems are controlled by the US military. Special Operations first employed RIAB systems in Afghanistan in 2005 which improved their ability to supply information to and communicate with the local population in their areas of operation.

== See also ==
- Voice of America
- Asia-Pacific Broadcasting Union
- Radio Netherlands Worldwide
