= Mykola Melnychenko =

Ukrainian bodyguard

- Микола Мельниченко
- Born: October 18, 1966 (age 58); Zapadynka, Vasylkiv, Ukrainian SSR, Soviet Union (now Ukraine)
- Occupation: Bodyguard

Mykola Ivanovych Melnychenko (Note: Ukrainian: Микола Іванович Мельниченко, romanized: Mykola Ivanovych Melnychenko) (born October 18, 1966) was a bodyguard of Ukrainian former president Leonid Kuchma. He is also an officer of the State Security Administration of Ukraine.

Between 1998 and 2000, Melnychenko allegedly recorded multiple conversations that took place in Kuchma's office before fleeing abroad with the secretly taped recordings. The publication of these recordings in 2000 caused a major scandal in Ukraine (known as the Cassette Scandal), which dramatically affected the country's domestic and foreign policy. Melnychenko's principal accusations against Kuchma (supposedly confirmed by the recordings) are the ordering of the kidnapping and murder of journalist Georgiy Gongadze. The United States government became involved after one of the records revealed the alleged transfer of an advanced Ukrainian radar system Kolchuha to Saddam Hussein's Iraq. Hundreds of other allegations are based on the recordings.

== Biography ==
Mykola Melnychenko was born in the village of Zapadynka, Kyiv Oblast (now outskirt of Vasylkiv) to a family of coal miners moved from Horlivka, eastern Ukraine. He graduated from the Kyiv Military Institute of Control and Signals in Kyiv and became a KGB communications protection expert. In 1992, soon after the collapse of the Soviet Union, Melnychenko started his career in Ukraine's State Security Administration (formerly the 9th Directorate of the Committee for State Security (KGB)). Later, he joined President Leonid Kuchma's team of bodyguards and at the time of the scandal, Melnychenko held the rank of Major. His main duty was to protect the President's office against possible eavesdropping.

Melnychenko is divorced with one daughter.

== The 'Cassette Scandal' ==
On November 28, 2000, Ukrainian politician Oleksandr Moroz publicly accused President Kuchma of involvement in the murder of Gongadze, naming Melnychenko as the source of information and playing selected recordings to journalists, starting the 'Cassette Scandal'. Days earlier Melnychenko had fled Ukraine to Ostrava in the Czech Republic, where he left several bags containing dozens of CDs storing thousands of digital recordings. Melnychenko left Ukraine covertly with his family, breaking an official prohibition on leaving the country.

Melnychenko claimed that he acted alone when recording the President's conversations and then publishing them abroad. According to Melnychenko, he put an amateur digital dictaphone under a sofa in Kuchma's office and was changing it every time he inspected the room. As the Major states, he was motivated purely by his disillusionment with what he perceived as the extremely corrupt nature of Kuchma's regime and "decided to document evidences of crimes" committed by the President. After the disappearance of Georgiy Gongadze, he supposedly decided to publish the recordings and protect his life. Then Melnychenko turned to his political sympathizer Oleksander Moroz for help, and received it.

Later, Melnychenko moved to the United States and received political asylum there. His tapes were eventually made available to the United States intelligence services and examined to determine their authenticity and content. The authenticity of the whole file of tapes remains officially unconfirmed. However, U.S. forensic experts have officially analyzed the section of tapes concerning Iraq issues and found it authentic.

The Ukrainian authorities have issued an international search warrant for Melnychenko, claiming that he is an 'important witness' and possible traitor of state secrets. However, no evidence of forced return or assassination efforts against Melnychenko were made public.

Many experts and journalists find Melnychenko's story highly questionable. In particular, they argue that:

- It is not clear why or how exactly Melnychenko started the operation. Being a career tech agent, he has never been involved in any kind of intelligence, analysis or criminal investigation. Thus, he was unlikely to have information on the President's committing judicially proven crimes.
- The means of recording described by Melnychenko seems odd, both in technical and operative terms. Indeed, it is impossible to record about 500 hours of conversations by simply changing amateur dictaphone once a day. Melnychenko's former commanding officers argue that even a very small device would be easily discovered during routine searches of the room conducted by several agents.
- The original device(s) used for recording, as well as the full file of recordings, have never been presented to journalists or Ukrainian prosecutors. Besides, Melnychenko should have known that a recording copied from digital recorder will not be found authentic, making the whole idea of "documenting evidences" a nonsense.

Nevertheless, experts and politicians analyzing the recordings agree that at least some of them are real, judging by known voices, speaking manners and confidential details mentioned. A few politicians, including Kuchma himself, have officially claimed they recognize their own voices on the tapes. However, the President and his supporters have always denied the authenticity of the body of conversations recorded, calling them a "montage". On the other hand, in 2002 Bruce Koenig, of the US forensic firm Bek Tek, a former worker in the FBI's forensic laboratory, examined the recordings and concluded that there were no signs of them having been doctored.

== Events following the scandal ==
After he received asylum, Melnychenko started to become actively involved in Ukraine's politics and foreign relations, making comments for media and writing books based on his records.

In 2004, Volodymyr Tsvil, a Ukrainian businessman and former KGB officer who supposedly assisted Melnychenko in his escape and further accommodation in the West, publicly accused him of not revealing certain details of the case.

On March 1, 2005 the criminal case against Melnychenko for "the disclosure of state secrets, abuse of office and using counterfeit documents" was closed.

Melnychenko tried to run in the 2010 Ukrainian presidential election but was not registered as a candidate because he did not pay the mandatory election deposit of 2.5 million hryvnya.

On December 6, 2009 Melnychenko accused Volodymyr Lytvyn of ordering the murder of journalist Georgiy Gongadze in 2000. A spokesperson for Lytvyn dismissed the claims as part of the 2010 Ukrainian presidential election campaign.

On July 29, 2011 the criminal case against Melnychenko originally closed on March 1, 2005 was reopened. In October 2011 an arrest warrant against him was issued for "evading investigation and preventing the establishment of truth". According to Ukrainian press Melnychenko was living in the United States at the time, while he claimed he was in Israel; he said he lived there because "there was a plan to physically exterminate me". In late March 2010 the investigation into Melnychenko was suspended because his location had not been established (Melnychenko himself claimed he was living in the United States).

In October 2012, Melnychenko was briefly detained and then released by the law enforcement services of Ukraine.

== See also ==
- Cassette Scandal
