= David S. Alberts =

American Director of Research (born 1942)

David Stephen Alberts (born 1942) is a former American Director of Research for the Office of the Assistant Secretary of Defense for Networks and Information Integration (NII).

== Biography ==
David S. Alberts did his undergraduate work was at City College of New York where he received a bachelor's of arts degree in statistics in 1964. He received a master's degree in 1966 and a doctorate in operations research in 1968 from the University of Pennsylvania.

Alberts' academic career has included serving as first director of the Computer Science Program at New York University and has held professional rank posts at the NYU Graduate School of Business, the City University of New York, and most recently as a research professor at George Mason University.

He was the director of Advanced Concepts, Technologies, and Information Strategies; deputy director of the Institute for National Strategic Studies, and the executive agent for Department of Defense Command and Control Research Program. This included responsibility for the Center for Advanced Concepts and Technology and the School of Information Warfare and Strategy at the National Defense University.

Dr. Alberts has chaired numerous international and national conferences and symposia and has authored or co-authored many publications, some of which are included in tutorials given by the IEEE and other professional societies. He has served as an officer in a number of professional societies and has contributed to AIAA, MORS, TIMS, AFCEA, and ORSA. At the local level, Alberts has served as Assistant to the Commissioner of the New York City Police Department.

Honors have included the Secretary of Defense's Outstanding Public Service Award, Aviation Week and Space Technology's Government/Military Laurel, and the inaugural Network Centric Warfare Award for Best Contribution to the Theory of NCW presented by the Institute for Defense and Government Advancement.

He is currently the president of the International Command and Control Institute (IC2I), a non-profit dedicated to ensuring that the body of literature created and inspired by the Department of Defense Command and Control Research Program remains accessible to researchers. He is also a senior fellow at the Institute for Defense Analyses, a federally funded research and development center. His current research focuses on the relationships and inter-dependencies between and among approaches to C2 and Governance, composite network characteristics and performance, automation and autonomy, and cyber.

== Work ==
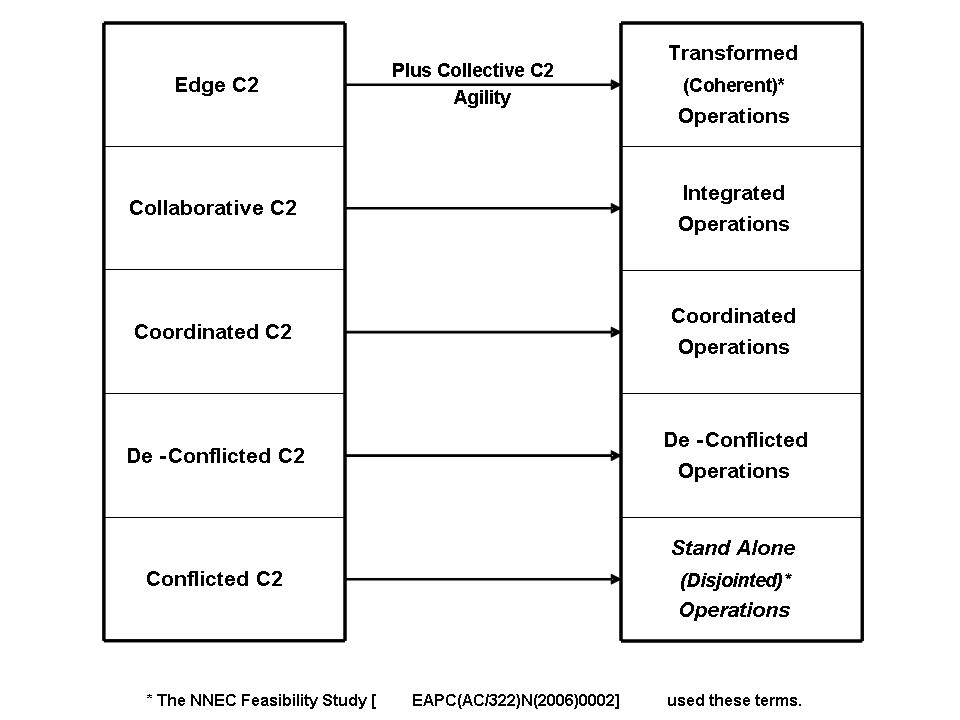
NEC C2 Maturity Model under development by SAS-065

In his book entitled The Agility Advantage, he proposes "agility" as the measure of choice for organizations, collections of organizations, processes, systems, and individuals engaged in complex endeavors (e.g. civil-military, cyber-security, economic development). A NATO research group, chaired by Dr. Alberts was formed to explore the ideas put forth in The Agility Advantage. In 2013, this group (SAS-085) completed its final report which received the 2014 NATO Scientific Achievement Award. In C2 Re-Envisioned: The Future of the Enterprise (2015), a collaboration with co-authors Marius Vassiliou and John R. Agre identifies and discusses four interrelated megatrends that are shaping the current practice of C2 and the challenges enterprises are and will continue to face in the 21st century. This book includes an analysis of historical examples and experimental evidence to identify the ways that C2 can go wrong. It presents a set of conclusions regarding the ways to get C2 right. The book was published in Chinese in 2017.

He co-authored an article with Mark E. Nissen, which was published in the International C2 Journal, entitled Toward Harmonizing Command and Control with Organization and Management Theory. Another recent article Agility, Focus and Convergence: The Future of Command and Control challenges not only long-held command and control beliefs but the very language of command and control itself.

In early 2010, he developed a comprehensive educational campaign to remedy the lack of awareness and understanding of the nature of 21st century missions, Networked Enabled Capability (NEC), and the implications for Command and Control (C2) and intelligence. The overall objective is to develop the widespread awareness and in-depth understanding necessary to accelerate a “network-centric” transformation of existing C2I organizations, processes, and systems to make them more effective and efficient. This campaign involves the development of curricula, courses, educational materials, and experimental environments that provide students with “hands-on” opportunities to experience a variety of network-enabled capabilities and network-enabled C2 (NEC2) under different mission-related scenarios and circumstances is the first such offering. The C2-related educational materials he created, the Network Enabled Command and Control (NEC2) Short Course, consists of 8 course modules. Each can be accessed and downloaded from the CCRP website (NEC2 Short Modules).

== Leadership of NATO Research Groups ==
Alberts has chaired a number of NATO research groups, the latest of which is SAS-143 that is developing a conceptual framework for Multi-Domain C2 and using this framework to explore the C2 implication of 1) operating in contested cyber environments and 2) incorporating increasingly sophisticated non-human intelligent collaborators into organizations and teams. A previous NATO Research Group, completed in 2013, focused on validating C2 Agility using case studies and experiments ( NATO-TR-SAS-085) This group received the prestigious 2014 NATO Scientific Achievement Award. The group's findings have important implications for the future of military organizations and the operations they undertake. Their final report is posted on the DoD CCRP website. Previous NATO groups he has chaired have produced a series of seminal C2-related works, including: the NATO NEC C2 Maturity Model the NATO Code of Best Practice for C2 Assessment,] and the NATO Code of Best Practice: Experimentation.

== Publications ==
Alberts is credited with helping to provide the intellectual foundation for an Information Age transformation of military institutions. His works include:

- 1995. Command Arrangements for Peace Operations. With Richard E. Hayes. Washington, DC: National Defense University Press Publications.
- 1996. Defensive Information Warfare. Washington, DC: National Defense University Press Publications.
- 1996. The Unintended Consequences of Information Age Technologies. Washington, DC: National Defense University Press Publications.
- 1997. Complexity, Global Politics, and National Security. With Thomas J. Czerwinski, eds. Washington, DC: National Defense University Press.
- 1999. Network Centric Warfare Developing and Leveraging Information Superiority (second edition). With John J. Garstka and Frederick P. Stein. Washington, DC: CCRP Publication Series.
- 2001. Understanding Information Age Warfare. Washington, DC: CCRP Publication Series.
- 2003. Power to the Edge. With Richard E. Hayes; with a foreword by John P. Stenbit. Washington, DC: CCRP Publication Series.
- 2003. Information Age Transformation. Washington, DC: CCRP Publication Series.
- 2005. Campaigns of Experimentation : Pathways to Innovation and Transformation. With Richard E. Hayes. Washington, DC : CCRP Publication Series.
- 2006. Understanding Command and Control. With Richard E. Hayes. Washington, DC: CCRP Publication Series.
- 2007. Planning: Complex Endeavors. With Richard E. Hayes. Washington, DC: CCRP Publication Series.
- 2010. The NATO NEC C2 Maturity Model. With SAS-065 Research Task Group. The full membership of SAS-065, along with their national affiliations and organizational homes, can be found in the Acknowledgments section.
- 2011. The Agility Advantage: A Survival Guide For Complex Enterprises and Endeavors
- 2012. Megatrends in C2. With Marius Vassiliou.
- 2015. C2 Re-Envisioned: The Future of the Enterprise with Marius Vassiliou and Jonathan Agre. Chinese edition published 2017.

In 1999,Command Arrangements for Peace Operations and Complexity, Global Politics, and National Security were suggested for The Airpower Professional's Book Club Top Ten List.

== See also ==
- Network-centric warfare
