= Net-Centric Enterprise Services =

Department of Defense program

Net-Centric Enterprise Services (NCES) is a Department of Defense program, managed by the Defense Information Systems Agency, to develop information technology infrastructure services for future systems used by the United States military.

Technically, the program is based on the concept of 'enterprise integration' from the sub discipline enterprise engineering of systems engineering, which enables the transmission of right information at the right place and at the right time and thereby enable communication between people, machines and computers and their efficient co-operation and co-ordination.

There are nine core enterprise services defined in the Network Centric Operations and Warfare - Reference Model (NCOW-RM):

1. storage
2. mediation
3. user assist
4. IA (Information Assurance)
5. ESM (Enterprise Service Management)
6. messaging
7. discovery & delivery
8. application
9. collaboration

NCES maps these nine services to four product areas:

1. Enterprise service-oriented architecture (SOA) foundation
2. Content discovery and delivery
3. Enterprise collaboration
4. Defense on-line portal

== See also ==
- Defense Discovery Metadata Specification
- Service-oriented architecture
- Web Service
- Enterprise integration
- Enterprise engineering
