= Command and Control Research Program =

Program of United States Departement of Defense

The Command and Control Research Program (CCRP) was an active DoD Research Program from 1994 to 2015. It was housed within the Office of the Assistant Secretary of Defense (NII) and it focused upon (1) improving both the state of the art and the state of the practice of command and control (C2) and (2) enhancing DoD's understanding of the national security implications of the Information Age. It provides "Out of the Box" thinking and explores ways to help DoD take full advantage of Information Age opportunities. The CCRP served as a bridge between the operational and technical communities and enhanced the body of knowledge and research infrastructure needed for future progress.

Dr. David S. Alberts, served as both the Director of Research for OASD(C3I), OASD(NII) / DoD CIO and the Director, DoD CCRP throughout the program's existence

In 2015, a non-profit entity, the International Command and Control Institute IC2I) assumed responsibility for the annual International Command and Control Research and Technology Symposium as well as the task of maintaining on-line access to the body of literature created by the CCRP. The IC2I website can be found at: www.internationalc2institute.org

== Purpose ==
The CCRP pursued a broad program of research and analysis in command and control (C2) theory, doctrine, applications, systems, the implications of emerging technology, and C2 experimentation. It also developed new concepts for C2 in joint, combined, and coalition operations in the context of both traditional and non-traditional missions (OOTW). Additionally, the CCRP supported professional military education in the areas of C2, Information Superiority, network-centric operations, and related technologies. To complement its own program of research, the CCRP provided a clearinghouse and archive for other C2 research, published books and monographs, and sponsored workshops and symposia.

The CCRP program served to bridge among the operational, technical, analytical, and educational communities. It focused on emerging requirements and mission areas where new concepts were needed. Combined and coalition operations constituted one of these areas. The evolution of Mission Capability Packages (MCPs) was the CCRP's approach to transforming new and promising concepts into real operational capabilities through the judicious blending of new C2 technologies and the essential elements of all related capabilities needed to field C2 mission capabilities.

== Conferences and Events ==
The CCRP sponsored a number of events each year. These symposia, workshops, and special meetings brought together the brightest and most innovative minds of the military, government, industry, and academia to share ideas, explore new concepts, and understand the implications of emerging technologies. They were designed to encourage the coalescence of a knowledgeable and energized command, control, and transformation community that would be better able to meet the national security challenges of the 21st century. The challenges that were of interest to the DoD CCRP included not only those associated with warfighting but also the challenges of stabilization, homeland defense, peacekeeping, and the full range of disaster relief and humanitarian missions.

The largest CCRP events were the (International) Command and Control Research and Technology Symposia or (I)CCRTS. These events were held in North America, Europe, Australia, and Asia.

At each event, the attendees presented hundreds of technical papers on diverse subjects related to command and control. Recurring subjects included Experimentation, Modeling and Simulation, Cognitive and Social Domain issues, Architectures, Metrics, Information Operations, New Technologies, Networks and Networking, Lessons Learned, Coalition Interoperability, and the Future of C2.

== FACT ==
The CCRP also sponsored the Focus, Agility, and Convergence Team (FACT). FACT was a forum for bringing practitioners, theorists, and analysts together to explore and develop new approaches to achieving the agility, focus and convergence needed to successfully prepare for and participate in complex endeavors across the spectrum of crisis to conflict.

== International C2 Journal ==
International C2 Journal
- Discipline: Command and control
- Language: English
- Edited by: David S. Alberts

Publication details
- History: 2006–2011
- Publisher: International C2 Institute, Command and Control Research Program, U.S. Office of the Assistant Secretary of Defense for Networks and Information Integration (United States)

Standard abbreviations
- ISO 4: Int. C2 J.

Indexing
- ISSN: 1938-6044
- OCLC no.: 137290307

Links
- Journal homepage

The International C2 Journal was an internationally directed and peer reviewed publication that presented articles written by authors from all over the world in many diverse fields of Command and Control such as systems, human factors, experimentation, and operations. The journal featured special issues addressing a single topic or theme. The journal was headed by David S. Alberts, serving as chairman of the editorial board.
