= Communications protection =

Application of communications security measures to telecommunications systems

In telecommunications, communications protection is the application of communications security (COMSEC) measures to telecommunications systems in order to: (a) deny unauthorized access to sensitive unclassified information of value, (b) prevent disruption of telecommunications services, or (c) ensure the authenticity of information handled by telecommunications systems.
