= World War II =

Global conflict from 1939 to 1945

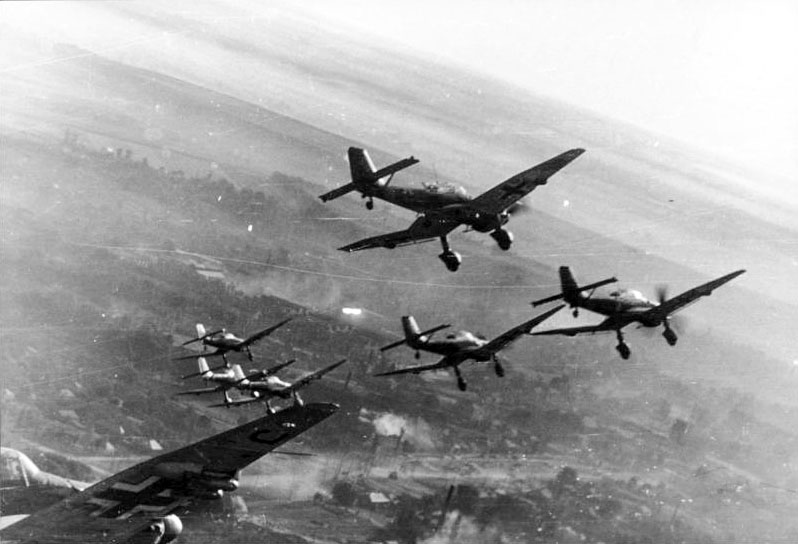
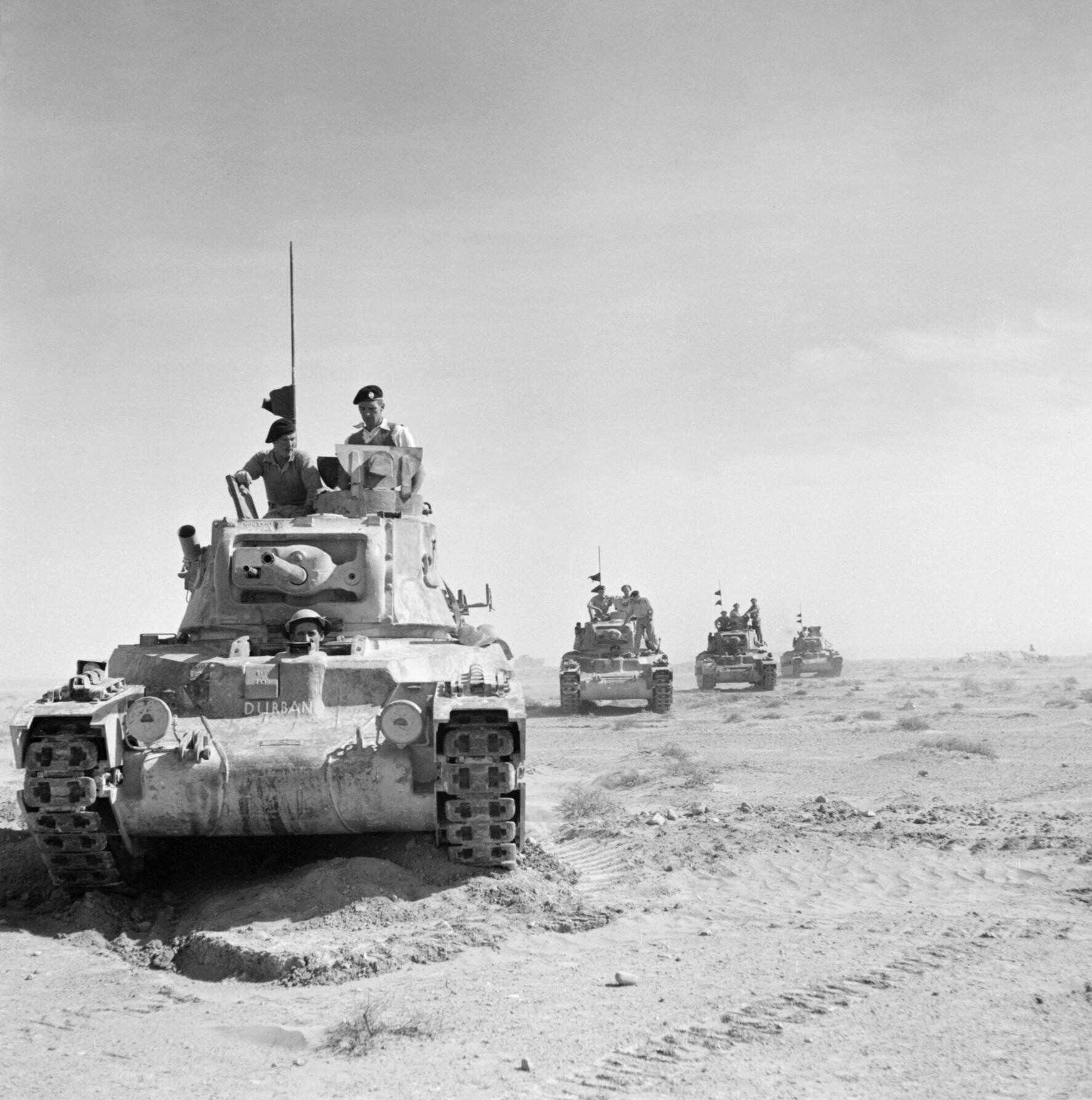
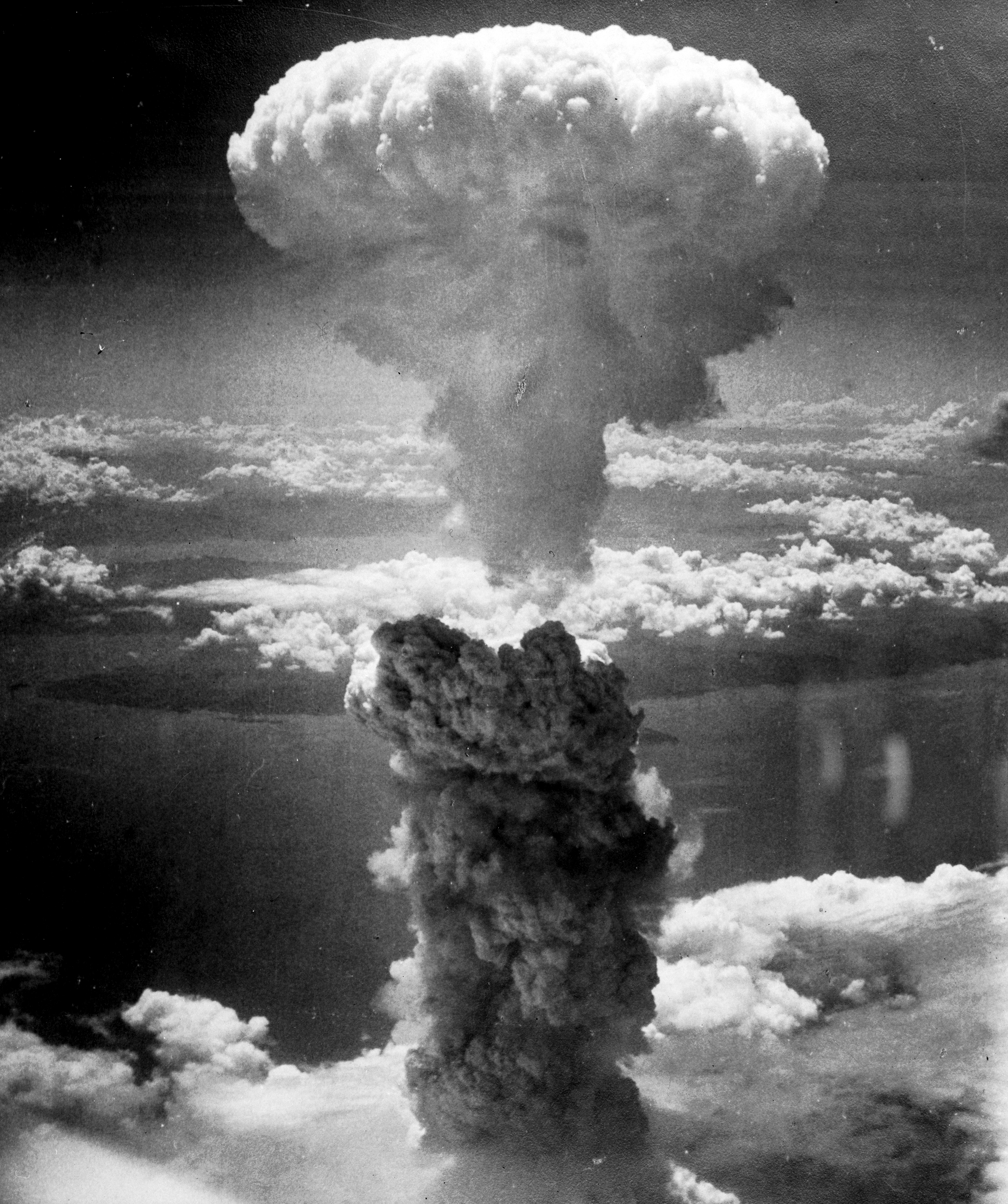
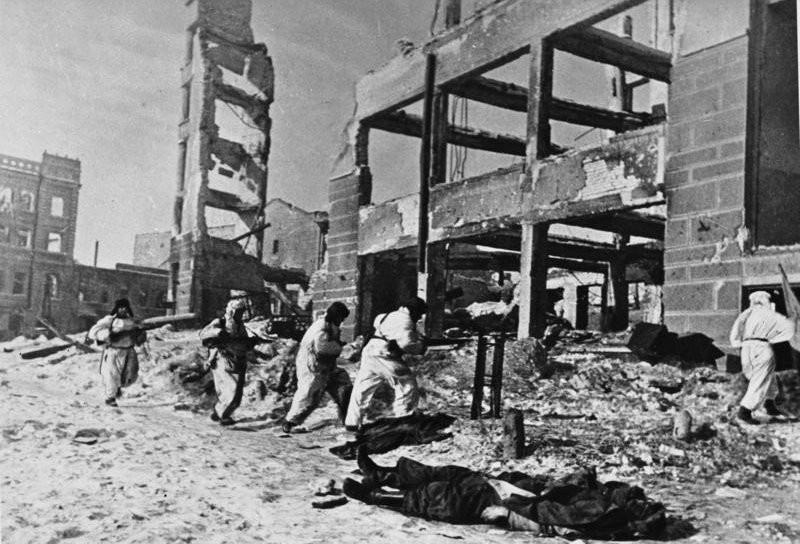
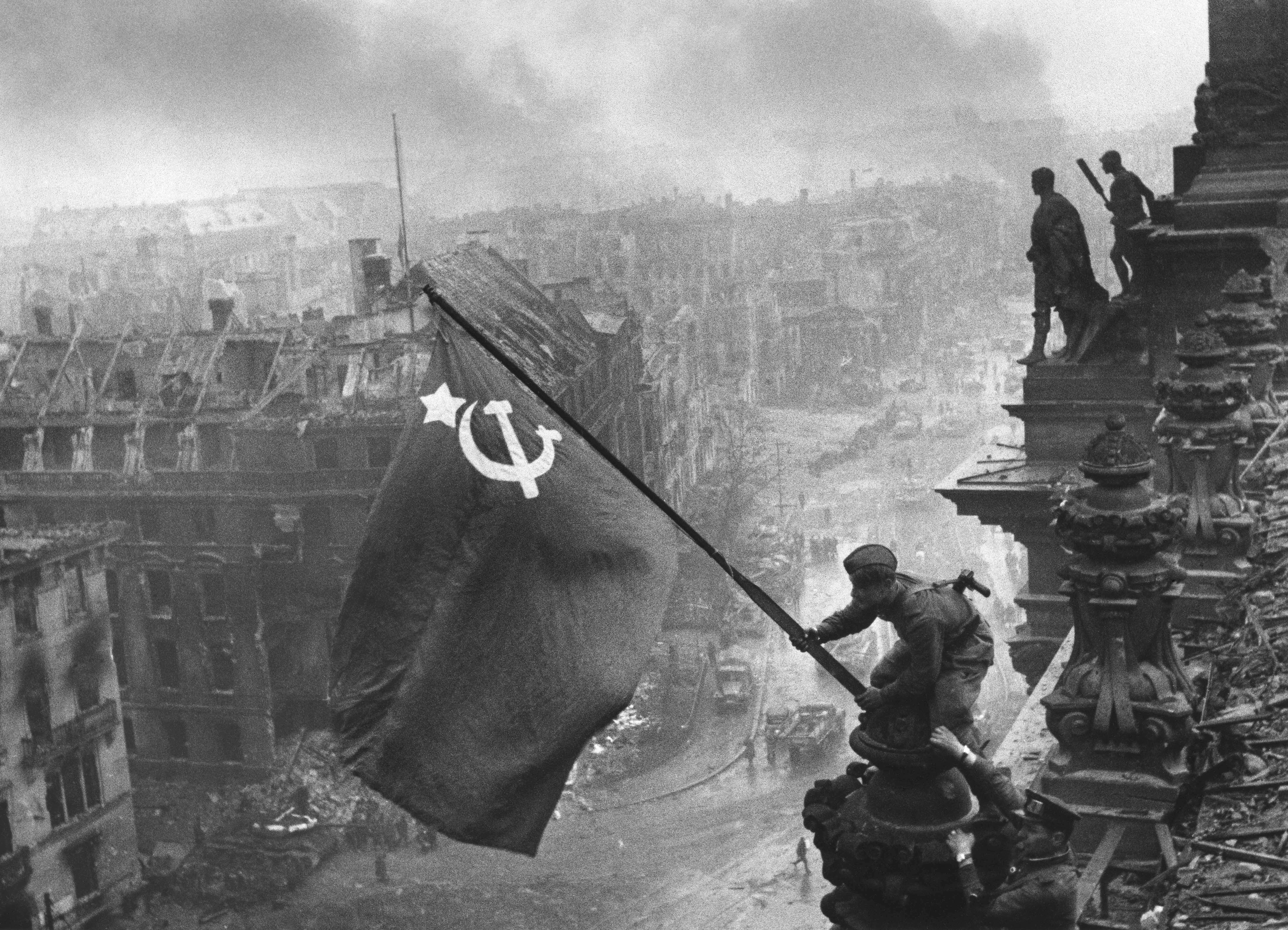
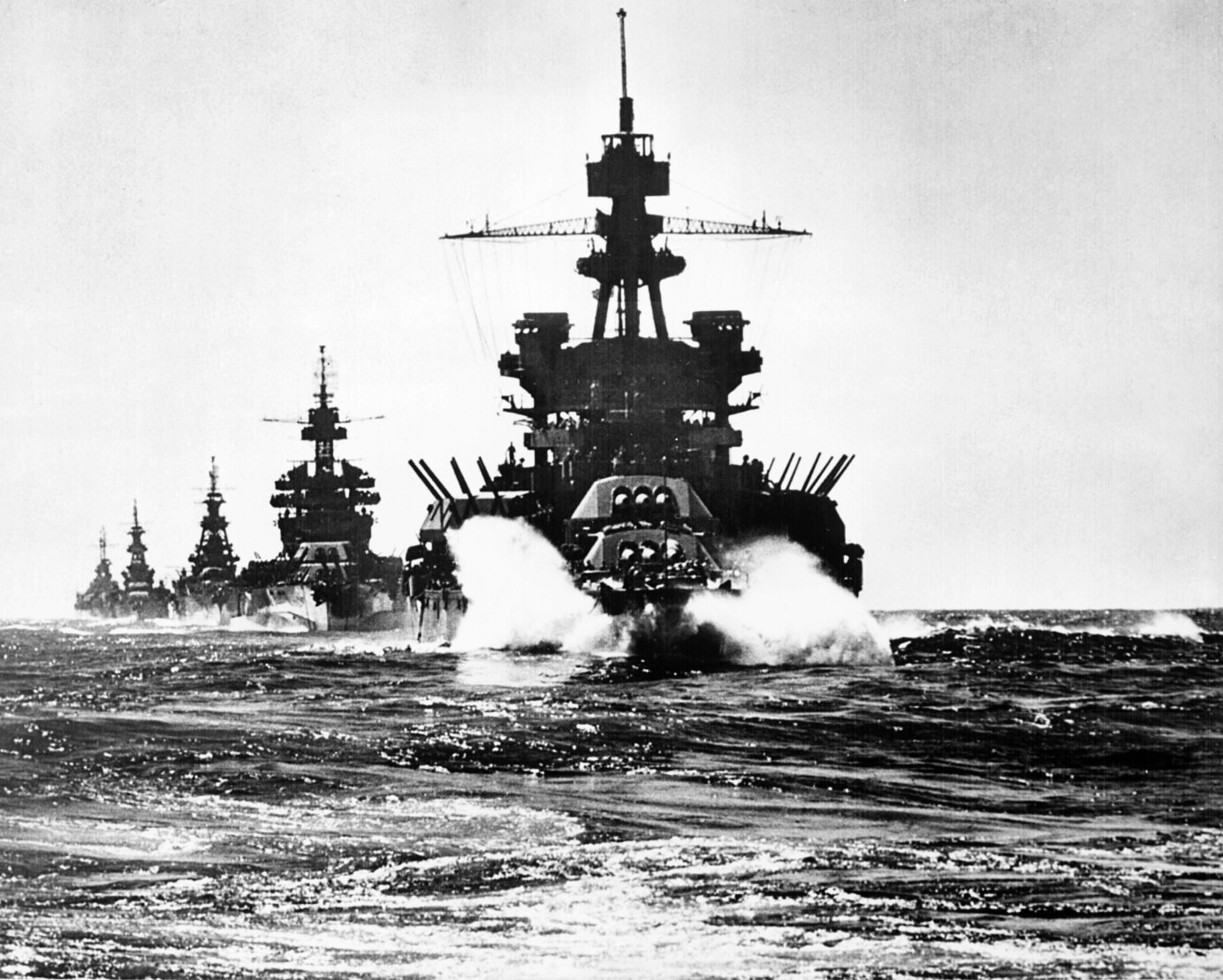
- From top to bottom, left to right: German Stuka dive bombers on the Eastern Front, 1943; British Matilda II tanks during the North African campaign, 1941; US atomic bombing of Nagasaki in Japan, 1945; Soviet troops at the Battle of Stalingrad, 1943; Soviet soldier raising a flag over the Reichstag after the Battle of Berlin, 1945; US warships in Lingayen Gulf in the Philippines, 1945
Date	1 September 1939 – 2 September 1945 (Note: While various other dates have been proposed as the date on which World War II began or ended, this is the period most frequently cited.) (6 years, 1 day)
Location	Global
Result	Allied victory; (see Aftermath of World War II)

Belligerents
Allies	Axis

Commanders and leaders
Main Allied leaders: (Soviet Union) Joseph Stalin; (United States) Franklin D. Roosevelt; (United Kingdom) Winston Churchill; (Republic of China (1912–1949)) Chiang Kai-shek	Main Axis leaders: (Nazi Germany) Adolf Hitler; (Empire of Japan) Hirohito; (Kingdom of Italy) Benito Mussolini

Casualties and losses
- 60–75 million deaths (military and civilian) (see World War II casualties)

World War II, (Note: Often abbreviated as WWII or WW2) or the Second World War (1 September 1939 – 2 September 1945), was a global conflict between two coalitions: the Allies and the Axis powers. Nearly all of the world's countries were involved, with many engaging in total war on an unprecedented scale. World War II was the deadliest conflict in history, causing the deaths of 60 to 75 million people, a majority of whom were civilians. Millions died as a result of massacres, starvation, disease and genocides. After the Allied victory, Germany, Austria, Japan and Korea were occupied, and German and Japanese leaders were tried for war crimes.

The causes of World War II included unresolved tensions in the aftermath of World War I and the rise of fascism in Europe and militarism in Japan. Key events preceding the war included Japan's invasion of Manchuria in 1931, the Spanish Civil War, the outbreak of the Second Sino-Japanese War in 1937, and Germany's annexations of Austria and the Sudetenland.

World War II began on 1 September 1939, when Nazi Germany, under Adolf Hitler, invaded Poland, after which the United Kingdom and France declared war on Germany. Poland was also invaded by the Soviet Union in mid-September, and was partitioned between the two states under the Molotov–Ribbentrop Pact. In 1940, the Soviet Union annexed the Baltic states and parts of Finland and Romania, while Germany conquered Norway, Denmark, Belgium, Luxembourg and the Netherlands. After the fall of France in June 1940, the war continued to be fought primarily by Germany, now assisted by Fascist Italy, against the British Empire and British Commonwealth, with fighting in the Balkans, Mediterranean, Middle East, East Africa, the aerial Battle of Britain, the Blitz and the naval Battle of the Atlantic. By mid-1941, Yugoslavia and Greece had also been defeated by Axis countries. In June 1941, Germany invaded the Soviet Union, opening the Eastern Front.

In December 1941, Japan attacked American and British territories in Asia and the Pacific, including Pearl Harbor in Hawaii, leading the United States to enter the war against the Axis. Japan conquered much of coastal China and Southeast Asia, but its advances in the Pacific were halted in June 1942 at the Battle of Midway. In early 1943, Axis forces were defeated in North Africa and at Stalingrad in the Soviet Union. An Allied invasion of Italy in July resulted in the fall of its fascist regime and Allied offensives in the Pacific and the Soviet Union forced the Axis to retreat on all fronts. In 1944, the Western Allies invaded France at Normandy, opening a new front, and the Soviet Union advanced into Central Europe. Japan also suffered major setbacks, including the crippling of its navy by the United States, the loss of key Western Pacific islands and defeats in Burma. The war in Europe concluded with the liberation of German-occupied territories and an invasion of Germany itself, which culminated in the fall of Berlin and Germany's unconditional surrender on 8 May 1945. On 6 and 9 August, the US dropped atomic bombs on Hiroshima and Nagasaki, followed by a Soviet invasion of Japanese-occupied Manchuria. Japan announced its unconditional surrender on 15 August and signed a surrender document on 2 September 1945.

World War II transformed the political, economic and social structures of the world and established the foundation of international relations for the rest of the 20th century and into the 21st century. The United Nations was created to foster international cooperation and prevent future conflicts, with the victorious great powers—China, France, the Soviet Union, the United Kingdom and the United States—becoming the permanent members of its Security Council. The Soviet Union and the United States emerged as rival superpowers, setting the stage for the Cold War. In the wake of Europe's devastation, the influence of its great powers waned, triggering the decolonisation of Africa and of Asia. Many countries whose industries had been damaged moved towards economic recovery and expansion.

== Start and end dates ==
Most historians agree that World War II began with the German invasion of Poland on 1 September 1939 and the British and French declarations of war on Germany two days later. Dates for the beginning of the Pacific War include the start of the Second Sino-Japanese War on 7 July 1937, or the earlier Japanese invasion of Manchuria on 18 September 1931. Other proposed starting dates include the Italian invasion of Abyssinia on 3 October 1935. The British historian Antony Beevor views the beginning of World War II as the Battles of Khalkhin Gol fought between Japan and the forces of Mongolia and the Soviet Union from May to September 1939. Others view the Spanish Civil War as the start of or prelude to World War II.

The date of the war's end is also not universally agreed upon. It was generally accepted at the time that the war ended with the armistice of 15 August 1945 (V-J Day), rather than with the formal surrender of Japan on 2 September 1945, which officially ended the war in Asia. A peace treaty between Japan and the Allies was signed in 1951. A 1990 treaty regarding Germany's future allowed the reunification of East and West Germany to take place. No formal peace treaty between Japan and the Soviet Union was ever signed, although the state of war between the two countries was terminated by the Soviet–Japanese Joint Declaration of 1956, which also restored full diplomatic relations between them.

== Background ==
=== Aftermath of World War I ===
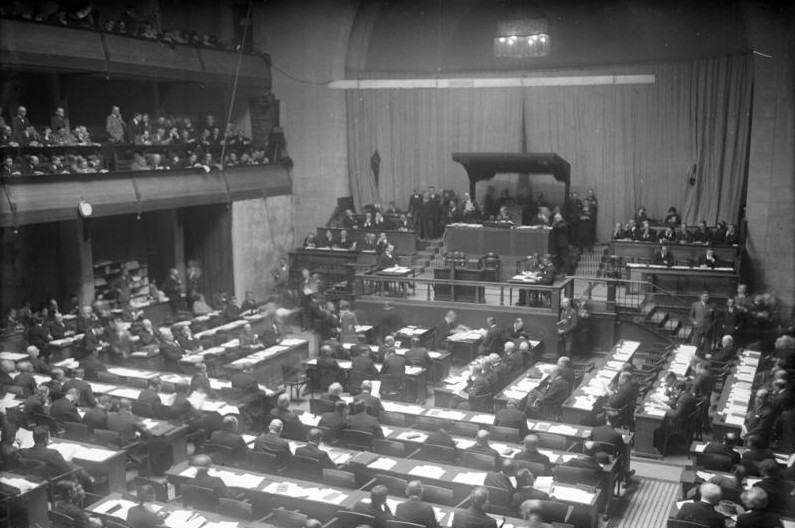
The League of Nations assembly, held in Geneva, Switzerland (1930)

World War I radically altered the European political map. The Central Powers each lost territory in their respective peace treaties at the conclusion of the conflict. New nation-states were created out of the dissolution of the Austro-Hungarian, Ottoman, and Russian Empires.

To prevent a future world war, the League of Nations was established in 1920 by the Paris Peace Conference. The organisation's primary function was to prevent armed conflict through collective security, military, and naval disarmament, as well as settling international disputes through peaceful negotiations and arbitration.

Despite strong pacifist sentiment after World War I, irredentist and revanchist nationalism had emerged in several European states. These sentiments were especially pronounced in Germany due to the significant territorial, colonial, and financial losses imposed by the Treaty of Versailles. Under the treaty, Germany lost around 13 per cent of its home territory and all its overseas possessions, while German annexation of other states was prohibited, reparations were imposed, and limits were placed on the size and capability of the country's armed forces.

=== Germany and Italy ===
The German Empire dissolved in the German revolution of 1918–1919, and a democratic government, later known as the Weimar Republic, was created. The interwar period saw strife between supporters of the new republic and hardline opponents on both the political right and left. Italy, as an entente ally, had made some territorial gains; however, Italian nationalists were angered that the promises made by the United Kingdom and France to secure Italian entrance into the war were not fulfilled in the peace settlement. From 1922 to 1925, the fascist movement led by Benito Mussolini seized power in Italy with a nationalist, totalitarian, and class collaborationist agenda that abolished representative democracy, repressed socialist, left-wing, and liberal forces and pursued an aggressive expansionist foreign policy aimed at making Italy a world power, promising the creation of a "New Roman Empire".

Adolf Hitler, leader of the Nazi Party, became the chancellor of Germany in 1933. The Nazis soon abolished parliamentary democracy, espousing a radical, racist revision of the world order, and began a rearmament campaign. Following the death of President Paul von Hindenburg in 1934, Hitler proclaimed himself Führer of Germany, becoming supreme commander of the armed forces whose members were bound to him by an oath of loyalty.

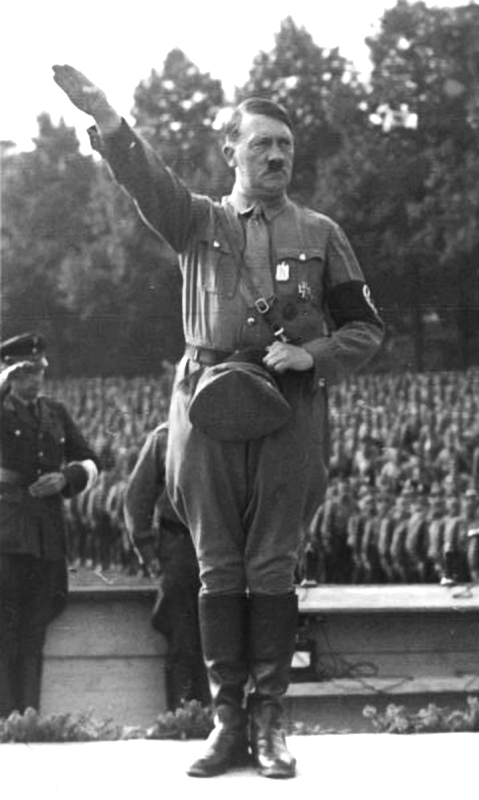
Adolf Hitler at a German Nazi political rally in Nuremberg, August 1933

=== European treaties ===
The United Kingdom, France and Italy formed the Stresa Front in April 1935, pledging to guarantee Germany's western borders and the independence of Austria. That June, the United Kingdom and Germany agreed that the German naval fleet could expand to 35% of Britain's fleet. The Soviet Union and France signed a treaty of mutual assistance but its military terms were vague. The United States, retreating into isolationism, passed the Neutrality Act in August of the same year.

Hitler defied the Versailles and Locarno Treaties by remilitarising the Rhineland in March 1936, encountering little opposition due to the policy of appeasement. In October 1936, Germany and Italy formed the Rome–Berlin Axis. A month later, Germany and Japan signed the Anti-Comintern Pact, which Italy joined the following year.

=== Asia ===
The Kuomintang party in China launched a unification campaign against regional warlords and nominally unified China in the mid-1920s, but was soon embroiled in a civil war against its former Chinese Communist Party (CCP) allies and new regional warlords. In 1931, an increasingly militaristic Empire of Japan, which had long sought influence in China as the first step of what its government saw as the country's right to rule Asia, staged the Mukden incident as a pretext to invade Manchuria and establish the puppet state of Manchukuo.

China appealed to the League of Nations to stop the Japanese invasion of Manchuria. Japan withdrew from the League of Nations after being condemned for its incursion into Manchuria. The two nations then fought several battles, in Shanghai, Rehe, and Hebei, until the Tanggu Truce was signed in 1933. Thereafter, Chinese volunteer forces continued the resistance to Japanese aggression in Manchuria, and Chahar and Suiyuan. After the 1936 Xi'an Incident, the Kuomintang and CCP forces agreed on a ceasefire to present a united front to oppose Japan.

== Pre-war events ==
=== Italian invasion of Ethiopia (1935) ===
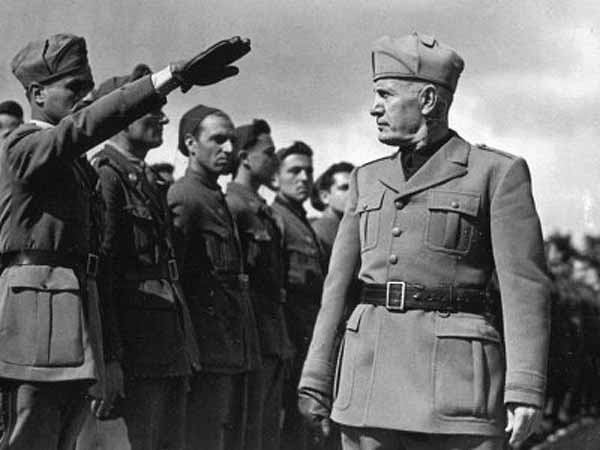
Benito Mussolini inspecting troops during the Italo-Ethiopian War, 1935

In 1935, Ethiopia stood alone as the last remaining African country that had successfully resisted European colonisation. The Second Italo-Ethiopian War was a colonial war that began in October 1935 and ended in May 1936. The war began with the invasion of the Ethiopian Empire (also known as Abyssinia) by the armed forces of the Kingdom of Italy (Regno d'Italia), which was launched from Italian Somaliland and Eritrea. It resulted in the military occupation of Ethiopia and its annexation into the newly created colony of Italian East Africa (Africa Orientale Italiana); in addition it exposed the weakness of the League of Nations as a force to preserve peace. Both Italy and Ethiopia were member nations, but the League did little when the former clearly violated Article X of the League's Covenant. The United Kingdom and France supported imposing sanctions on Italy, but the sanctions were not fully enforced and failed to end the invasion. Italy subsequently dropped its objections to Germany's goal of absorbing Austria.

=== Spanish Civil War (1936–1939) ===
When civil war broke out in Spain, Hitler and Mussolini lent military support to the Nationalist rebels, led by General Francisco Franco. Italy supported the Nationalists to a greater extent than the Nazis: Mussolini sent more than 70,000 ground troops, 6,000 aviation personnel, and 720 aircraft to Spain. The Soviet Union supported the existing government of the Spanish Republic. More than 30,000 foreign volunteers, known as the International Brigades, also fought against the Nationalists. Both Germany and the Soviet Union used this proxy war as an opportunity to test in combat their most advanced weapons and tactics. The Nationalists won the civil war in April 1939; Franco, now dictator, remained officially neutral during World War II but generally favoured the Axis. His largest collaboration with Germany was the sending of volunteers to fight on the Eastern Front.

=== Japanese invasion of China (1937) ===
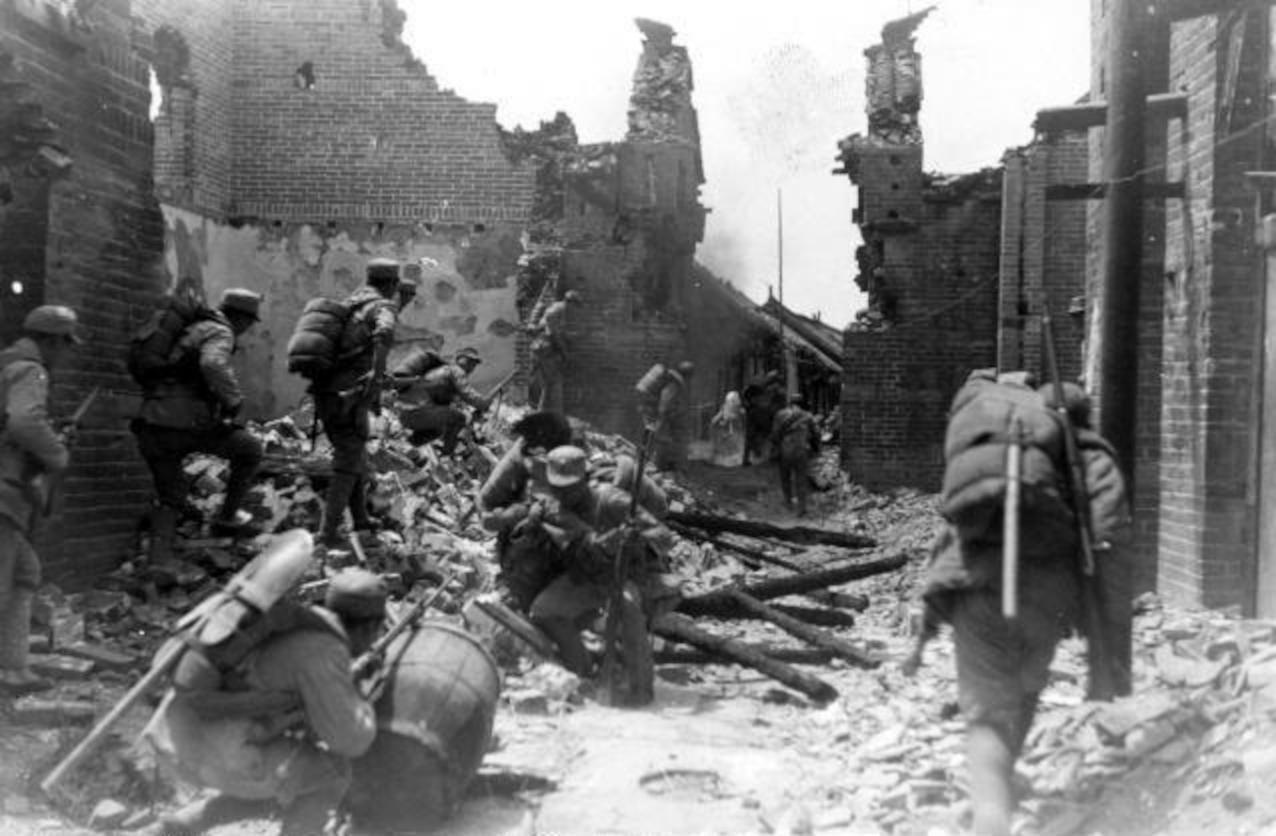
Chinese soldiers battle the Imperial Japanese Army in Taierzhuang, 1938

In July 1937, Japan captured the former Chinese imperial capital of Peking after instigating the Marco Polo Bridge incident, which culminated in the Japanese campaign to invade all of China following years of tension and low-level conflicts. The Soviets quickly signed a non-aggression pact with China to lend materiel support, effectively ending China's prior cooperation with Germany.

From September to November, the Japanese attacked Taiyuan, engaged the Kuomintang Army around Xinkou, fought communist forces in Pingxingguan and wrestled control over China's northern railway network. Nationalist Generalissimo Chiang Kai-shek deployed his best army to defend Shanghai, but after three months of heavy fighting, Shanghai fell. The Japanese continued to push Chinese forces back, capturing the capital Nanking in December 1937.

In March 1938, Nationalist Chinese forces won their first major victory at Taierzhuang, but ultimately lost control of the city of Xuzhou in May. In June 1938, Chinese forces stalled the Japanese advance by flooding the Yellow River; buying time for the Chinese to prepare their defences at Wuhan at heavy cost to the local civilian population, but the city was taken by October after heavy fighting along the Yangtze River.

Japanese military victories did not destroy Chinese resistance; instead, the Chinese government relocated inland to Chongqing and continued the war. Aiming to break Chinese morale, Japanese aircraft began striking cities in the Sichuan basin in a bombing campaign, killing tens of thousands of civilians.

=== Soviet–Japanese border conflicts ===
In the mid-to-late 1930s, Japanese forces in Manchukuo had sporadic border clashes with the Soviet Union and Mongolia. The Japanese doctrine of Hokushin-ron, which emphasised Japan's expansion northward, was favoured by the Imperial Army during this time. This policy would prove difficult to maintain in light of the Japanese defeat at Khalkin Gol in 1939, the ongoing Second Sino-Japanese War and ally Nazi Germany pursuing neutrality with the Soviets. Japan and the Soviet Union eventually signed a Neutrality Pact in April 1941, and Japan adopted the doctrine of Nanshin-ron, promoted by the Navy, which took its focus southward and eventually led to war with the United States and the Western Allies.

=== European occupations and agreements ===
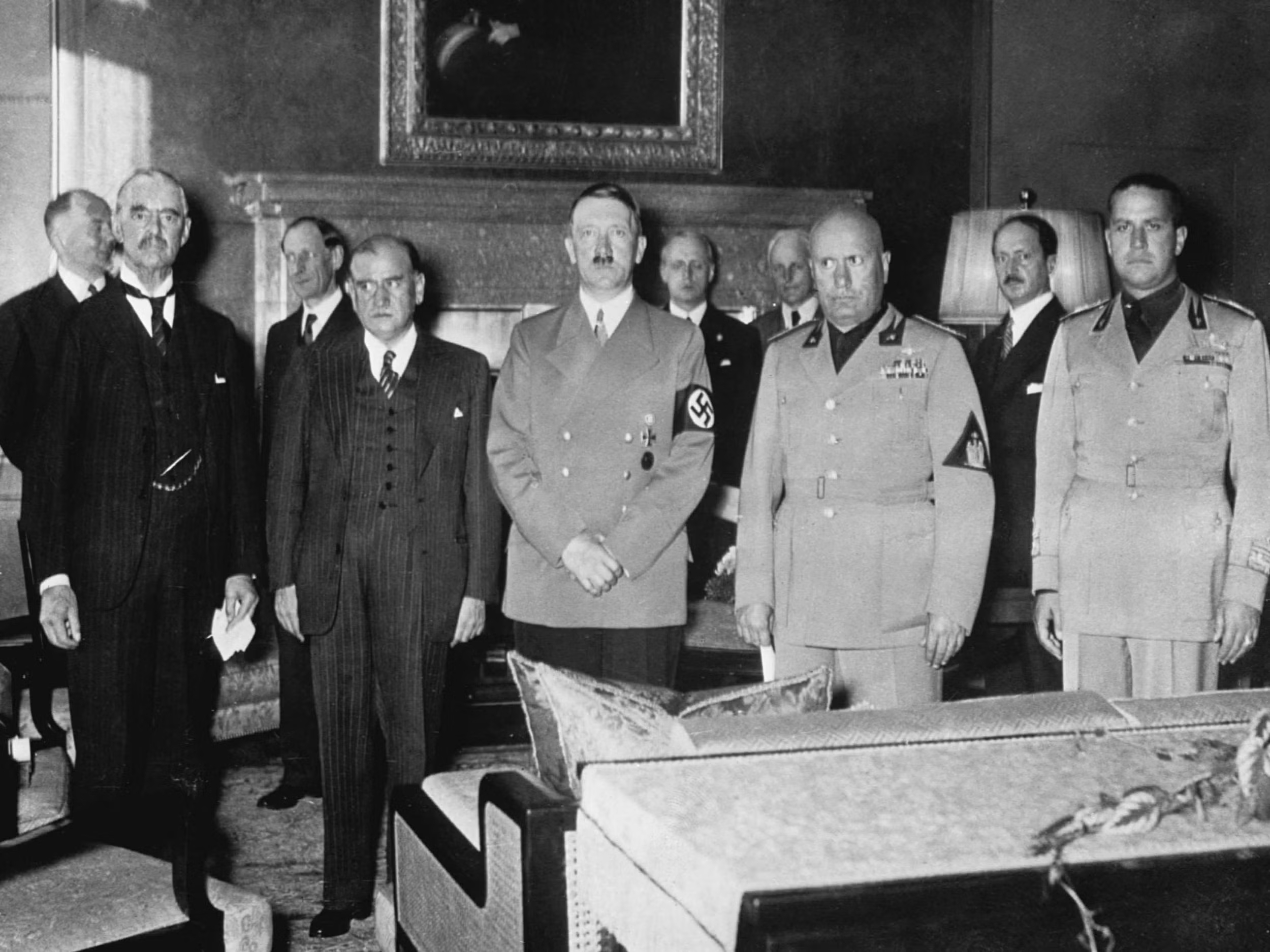
From left to right: Chamberlain, Daladier, Hitler, Mussolini, and Ciano pictured just before signing the Munich Agreement, 29 September 1938

In Europe, Germany and Italy were becoming more aggressive. In March 1938, Germany annexed Austria, again provoking little response from other European powers. Encouraged, Hitler began pressing German claims on the Sudetenland, an area of Czechoslovakia with a predominantly ethnic German population. Soon the United Kingdom and France followed the appeasement policy of British Prime Minister Neville Chamberlain and conceded this territory to Germany in the Munich Agreement, which was made against the wishes of the Czechoslovak government, in exchange for a promise of no further territorial demands. Soon afterwards, Germany and Italy forced Czechoslovakia to cede additional territory to Hungary, and Poland annexed the Trans-Olza region of Czechoslovakia.

Although all of Germany's stated demands had been satisfied by the agreement, privately Hitler was furious that British interference had prevented him from seizing all of Czechoslovakia in one operation. In subsequent speeches Hitler attacked British and Jewish "war-mongers" and in January 1939 secretly ordered a major build-up of the German navy to challenge British naval supremacy. In March 1939, Germany invaded the remainder of Czechoslovakia and subsequently split it into the German Protectorate of Bohemia and Moravia and a pro-German client state, the Slovak Republic. Hitler also delivered an ultimatum to Lithuania on 20 March 1939, forcing the concession of the Klaipėda Region, formerly the German Memelland.

Following further demands from Hitler regarding the Free City of Danzig and the Polish corridor, the United Kingdom and France guaranteed their support for Polish independence. When Italy conquered Albania in April 1939, the same guarantee was extended to the Kingdoms of Romania and Greece. Shortly after the Franco-British pledge to Poland, Germany and Italy formalised their own alliance with the Pact of Steel. Hitler accused the United Kingdom and Poland of trying to encircle Germany and renounced the Anglo-German Naval Agreement and the German–Polish declaration of non-aggression.

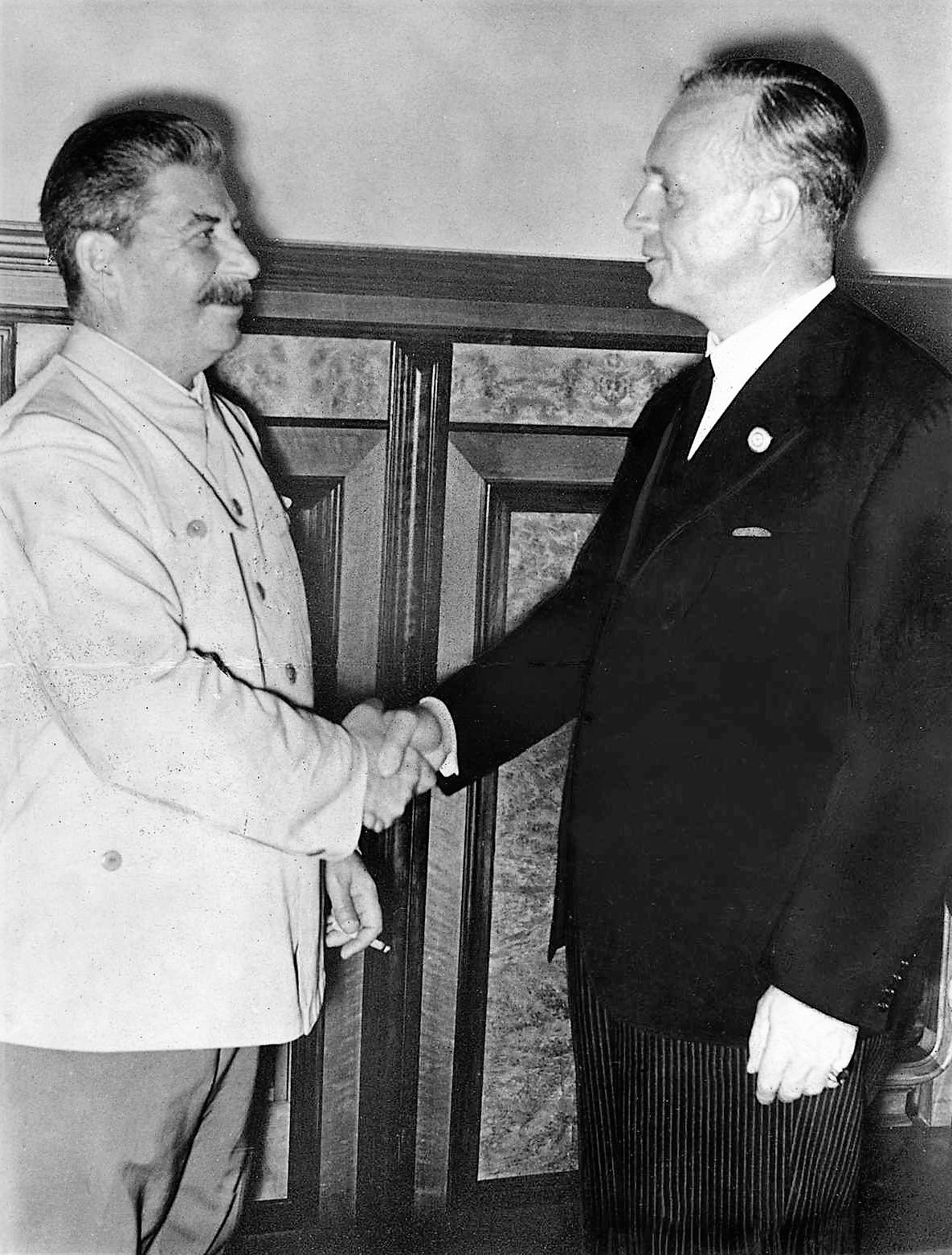
German Foreign Minister Joachim von Ribbentrop (right) and the Soviet leader Joseph Stalin after signing the Molotov–Ribbentrop Pact, 23 August 1939

The situation became a crisis in late August as Germany concentrated its forces near the Polish border. On 23 August, the Soviet Union signed a non-aggression pact with Germany, after tripartite negotiations for a military alliance between France, the United Kingdom, and Soviet Union had stalled. This pact had a secret protocol that defined German and Soviet spheres of influence: Lithuania for Germany; Finland, Estonia, Latvia, and Bessarabia for the Soviet Union; and Poland to be partitioned between the two powers. The pact ensured that Germany would not face a war with the Soviet Union when it invaded Poland. Immediately afterwards, Hitler ordered the attack to proceed on 26 August, but upon hearing that the United Kingdom had concluded a formal mutual assistance pact with Poland and that Italy would maintain neutrality, he decided to delay it.

== Course of the war ==
=== War breaks out in Europe (1939–1940) ===
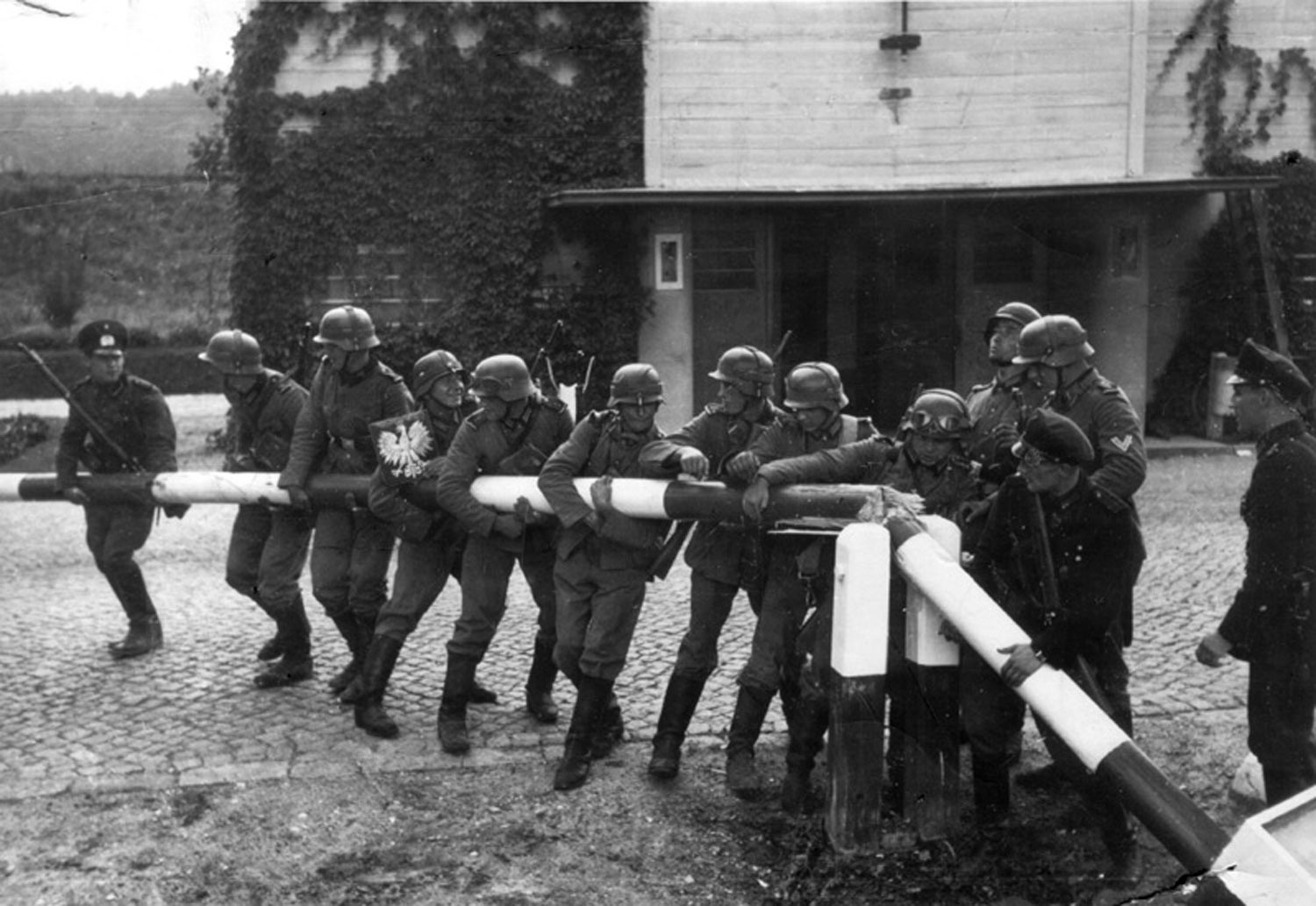
A German propaganda photograph reenacting the removal of the Polish border crossing in Sopot

On 1 September 1939, Germany invaded Poland after having staged several false flag border incidents as a pretext to initiate the invasion. The first German attack of the war came against the Polish defences at Westerplatte. The United Kingdom responded with an ultimatum for Germany to cease military operations, and on 3 September, after the ultimatum was ignored, Britain and France declared war on Germany. (Note: The UK declared war on Germany at 11 am. France followed 6 hours later at 5 pm.) During the Phoney War period, the alliance provided no direct military support to Poland, outside of a cautious French probe into the Saarland. The Western Allies also began a naval blockade of Germany, which aimed to damage the country's economy and war effort. Germany responded by ordering U-boat warfare against Allied merchant and warships, which would later escalate into the Battle of the Atlantic. On 8 September, German troops reached the suburbs of Warsaw. The Polish counter-offensive to the west halted the German advance for several days, but it was outflanked and encircled by the Wehrmacht. Remnants of the Polish army broke through to besieged Warsaw. On 17 September 1939, two days after signing a cease-fire with Japan, the Soviet Union invaded Poland under the supposed pretext that the Polish state had ceased to exist. On 27 September, the Warsaw garrison surrendered to the Germans, and the last large operational unit of the Polish Army surrendered on 6 October. Despite the military defeat, Poland never surrendered; instead, it formed the Polish government-in-exile and a clandestine state apparatus remained in occupied Poland. A significant part of Polish military personnel evacuated to Romania and Latvia; many of them later fought against the Axis in other theatres of the war.

Germany annexed western Poland and occupied central Poland; the Soviet Union annexed eastern Poland. Small shares of Polish territory were transferred to Lithuania and Slovakia. On 6 October, Hitler made a public peace overture to the United Kingdom and France but said that the future of Poland was to be determined exclusively by Germany and the Soviet Union. The proposal was rejected and Hitler ordered an immediate offensive against France, which was postponed until the spring of 1940 due to bad weather.

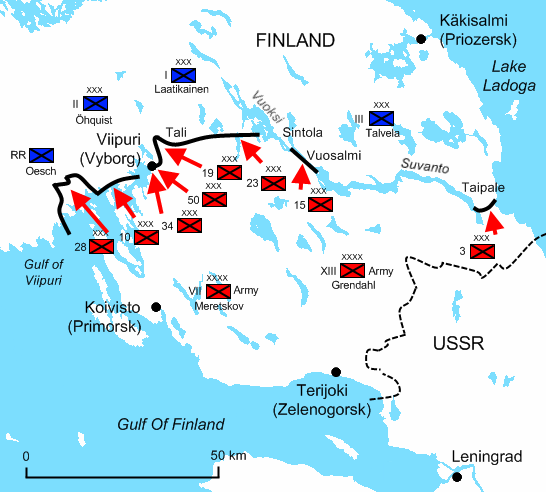
Mannerheim Line and Karelian Isthmus on the last day of the Winter War, 13 March 1940

After the outbreak of war, Stalin threatened Estonia, Latvia and Lithuania with military invasion, forcing the three Baltic countries to sign pacts allowing the creation of Soviet military bases in these countries; in October 1939, significant Soviet military contingents were moved there. Finland refused to sign a similar pact and rejected ceding part of its territory to the Soviet Union. The Soviet Union invaded Finland in November 1939, and was subsequently expelled from the League of Nations for this reason. Despite overwhelming numerical superiority, Soviet military success during the Winter War was modest, and the Finno–Soviet war ended in March 1940 with some Finnish concessions of territory.

In June 1940, the Soviet Union occupied the entire territories of Estonia, Latvia, Lithuania, as well as the Romanian regions of Bessarabia, Northern Bukovina, and the Hertsa region. In August 1940, Hitler imposed the Second Vienna Award on Romania which led to the transfer of Northern Transylvania to Hungary. In September 1940, Bulgaria demanded Southern Dobruja from Romania with German and Italian support, leading to the Treaty of Craiova. The loss of one-third of Romania's 1939 territory caused a coup against King Carol II, turning Romania into a fascist dictatorship under Marshal Ion Antonescu, with a course set towards the Axis in the hopes of a German guarantee. Meanwhile, German–Soviet political relations and economic co-operation gradually stalled, and both states began preparations for war.

=== Western Europe (1940–1941) ===
German advance into Belgium and Northern France, 10 May – 4 June 1940, sweeping past the Maginot Line (shown in dark red)

In April 1940, Germany invaded Denmark and Norway to protect shipments of iron ore from Sweden, which the Allies were attempting to cut off. Denmark capitulated after six hours, and despite Allied support, Norway was conquered within two months. British discontent over the Norwegian campaign led to the resignation of Prime Minister Neville Chamberlain, who was replaced by Winston Churchill on 10 May 1940.

On the same day, Germany launched an offensive against France. To circumvent the strong Maginot Line fortifications on the Franco-German border, Germany directed its attack at the neutral nations of Belgium, the Netherlands and Luxembourg. The Germans carried out a flanking manoeuvre through the Ardennes region, which was mistakenly perceived by the Allies as an impenetrable natural barrier against armoured vehicles. By successfully implementing new Blitzkrieg tactics, the Wehrmacht rapidly advanced to the English Channel, trapping the bulk of the Allied armies in Belgium and north-western France. The United Kingdom evacuated over 340,000 Allied troops from Dunkirk by early June, although they had to abandon almost all their equipment.

On 10 June, Italy invaded France, declaring war on both France and the United Kingdom. The Germans turned south against the weakened French army, and Paris fell to them on 14 June. Eight days later France signed an armistice with Germany; it was divided into German and Italian occupation zones, and an unoccupied rump state under the Vichy Regime, which was officially neutral but generally aligned with Germany. France kept its fleet, which the United Kingdom attacked on 3 July to prevent its seizure by Germany.

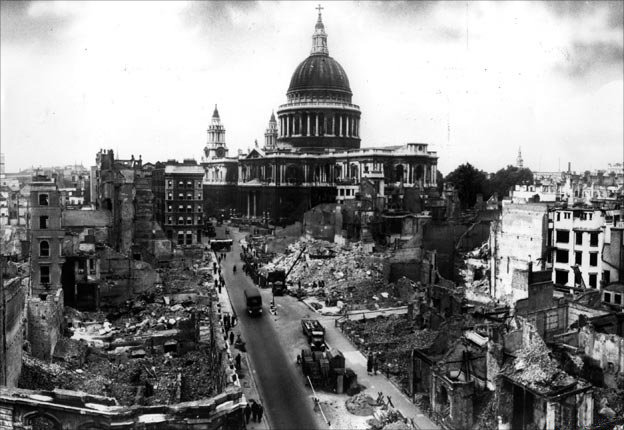
London's St Paul's Cathedral after the German Blitz on 29 December 1940

The air Battle of Britain began in early July with Luftwaffe attacks on shipping and harbours. The German campaign for air superiority started in August but its failure to defeat RAF Fighter Command forced the indefinite postponement of the proposed German invasion of Britain. The German strategic bombing offensive intensified with night attacks on London and other cities in the Blitz, but largely ended in May 1941 after failing to significantly disrupt the British war effort.

Using newly captured French ports, the German Navy enjoyed success against an over-extended Royal Navy, using U-boats against British shipping in the Atlantic. The British Home Fleet scored a significant victory on 27 May 1941 by sinking the German battleship Bismarck.

In November 1939, the United States was assisting China and the Western Allies, and had amended the Neutrality Act to allow "cash and carry" purchases by the Allies. In 1940, following the German capture of Paris, the size of the United States Navy was significantly increased. In September the United States further agreed to a trade of American destroyers for British bases. Still, a large majority of the American public continued to oppose any direct military intervention in the conflict well into 1941. In December 1940, President Franklin D. Roosevelt accused Hitler of planning world conquest and ruled out any negotiations as useless, calling for the United States to become an "arsenal of democracy" and promoting Lend-Lease programmes of military and humanitarian aid to support the British war effort; Lend-Lease was later extended to the other Allies, including the Soviet Union after it was invaded by Germany. The United States started strategic planning to prepare for a full-scale offensive against Germany.

At the end of September 1940, the Tripartite Pact formally united Japan, Italy and Germany as the Axis powers. The Tripartite Pact stipulated that any country—with the exception of the Soviet Union—that attacked any Axis Power would be forced to go to war against all three. The Axis expanded in November 1940 when Hungary, Slovakia and Romania joined. Romania and Hungary later made major contributions to the Axis war against the Soviet Union, in Romania's case partially to recapture territory ceded to the Soviet Union.

=== Mediterranean (1940–1941) ===
In early June 1940, the Italian Regia Aeronautica and Regia Marina laid siege to Malta, a British island that controlled the central Mediterranean. From late summer to early autumn, Italy conquered British Somaliland and made an incursion into British-held Egypt. In October, Italy attacked Greece, but the attack was repulsed with heavy Italian casualties; the campaign ended within months with minor territorial changes. To assist Italy and prevent Britain from gaining a foothold, Germany prepared to invade the Balkans, which would threaten Romanian oil fields and strike against British dominance of the Mediterranean.

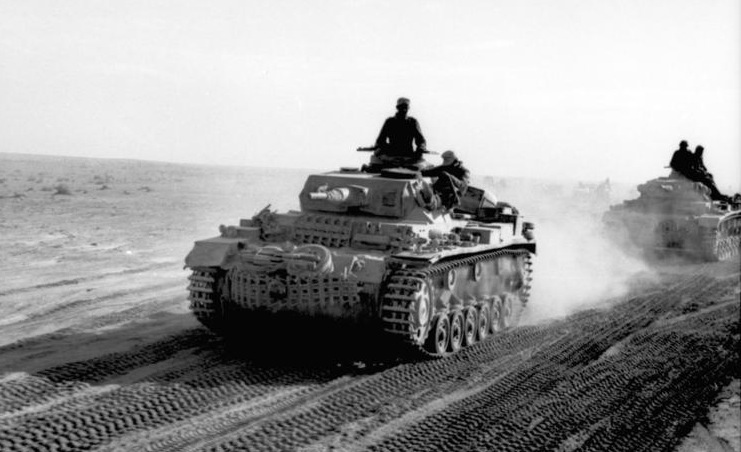
German Panzer III of the Afrika Korps advancing across the North African desert, April 1941

In December 1940, British Empire forces began counter-offensives against Italian forces in Egypt and Italian East Africa. The offensives were successful; by early February 1941, Italy had lost control of eastern Libya, and large numbers of Italian troops had been taken prisoner. The Italian Navy also suffered significant defeats, with the Royal Navy putting three Italian battleships out of commission after a carrier attack at Taranto, and neutralising several more warships at the Battle of Cape Matapan.

Italian defeats prompted Germany to deploy an expeditionary force to North Africa; at the end of March 1941, Erwin Rommel's Afrika Korps launched an offensive which drove back Commonwealth forces. In less than a month, Axis forces advanced to western Egypt and besieged the port of Tobruk. In November, Commonwealth forces launched a counter-offensive in North Africa and reclaimed all the gains the Germans and Italians had made.

By late March 1941, Bulgaria and Yugoslavia signed the Tripartite Pact; however, the Yugoslav government was overthrown two days later by pro-British nationalists. Germany and Italy responded with simultaneous invasions of both Yugoslavia and Greece, commencing on 6 April 1941 with a bombing of Belgrade; both nations were forced to surrender within the month. The airborne invasion of the Greek island of Crete at the end of May completed the German conquest of the Balkans. Armed resistance soon emerged in Yugoslavia and Greece and continued until the end of the war.

In the Middle East in May, Commonwealth forces quashed an uprising in Iraq which had been supported by German aircraft from bases within Vichy-controlled Syria. Between June and July, British-led forces invaded the French possessions of Syria and Lebanon, assisted by the Free French.

=== Axis attack on the Soviet Union (1941) ===
European theatre of World War II animation map, 1939–1945 – Red: Western Allies and the Soviet Union after 1941; Green: Soviet Union before 1941; Blue: Axis powers

On 22 June 1941, Germany, supported by Italy and Romania, invaded the Soviet Union in Operation Barbarossa, with Germany accusing the Soviets of plotting against them; they were joined shortly by Finland and Hungary. The primary targets of this surprise offensive were the Baltic region, Moscow and Ukraine, with the ultimate goal of ending the 1941 campaign near the Arkhangelsk–Astrakhan line—from the Caspian to the White Seas. Hitler's objectives were to eliminate the Soviet Union as a military power, exterminate communism, generate Lebensraum ("living space") by dispossessing the native population, and guarantee access to the strategic resources needed to defeat Germany's remaining rivals.

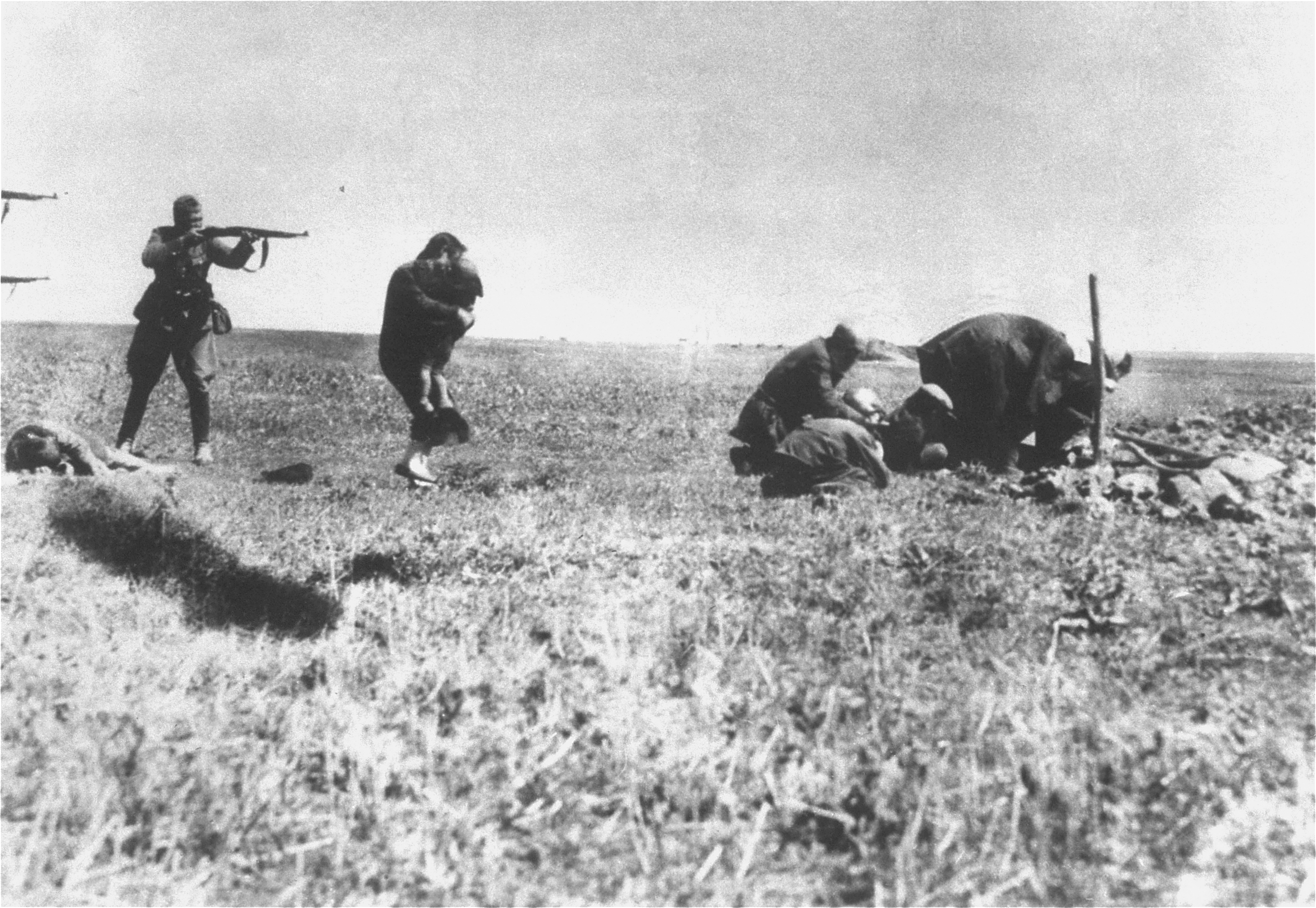
Members of the Einsatzgruppen prepares to shoot a Jewish mother holding her child, Ivangorod, Ukraine

During the summer, the Axis made significant gains into Soviet territory, inflicting immense losses in both personnel and materiel, mainly in massive encirclements around Minsk, Smolensk, and Uman. The Soviets evacuated over 1,500 factories and millions of workers to regions in the east and south, away from the front lines.

Nazi policy entailed that Wehrmacht subject Soviet POWs (Prisoners of war) to murderous treatment, executing all Jewish and Communist POWs immediately per the Commissar Order, and subjecting the remainder to forced marches to open-air concentration camps, where they were to be deliberately starved to death. By the end of the winter of 1941, 2.8 million Soviet POWs had died in German captivity. Some 3.3 million Soviet POWs would die in German captivity by the war's end in total, a nearly 60% mortality rate.

By mid-August, however, the German Army High Command decided to suspend the offensive of a considerably depleted Army Group Centre and to divert the 2nd Panzer Group to reinforce troops advancing towards central Ukraine and Leningrad. The Kiev offensive was overwhelmingly successful, resulting in encirclement and elimination of four Soviet armies, and made possible further advance into Crimea and industrially-developed eastern Ukraine (the First Battle of Kharkov).

The diversion of three-quarters of the Axis troops and the majority of their air forces from France and the central Mediterranean to the Eastern Front prompted the United Kingdom to reconsider its grand strategy. In July, the UK and the Soviet Union formed a military alliance against Germany and in August, the United Kingdom and the United States jointly issued the Atlantic Charter, which outlined British and American goals for the post-war world. In late August the British and Soviets invaded neutral Iran to secure the Persian Corridor, Iran's oil fields, and preempt any Axis advances through Iran toward the Baku oil fields or India.

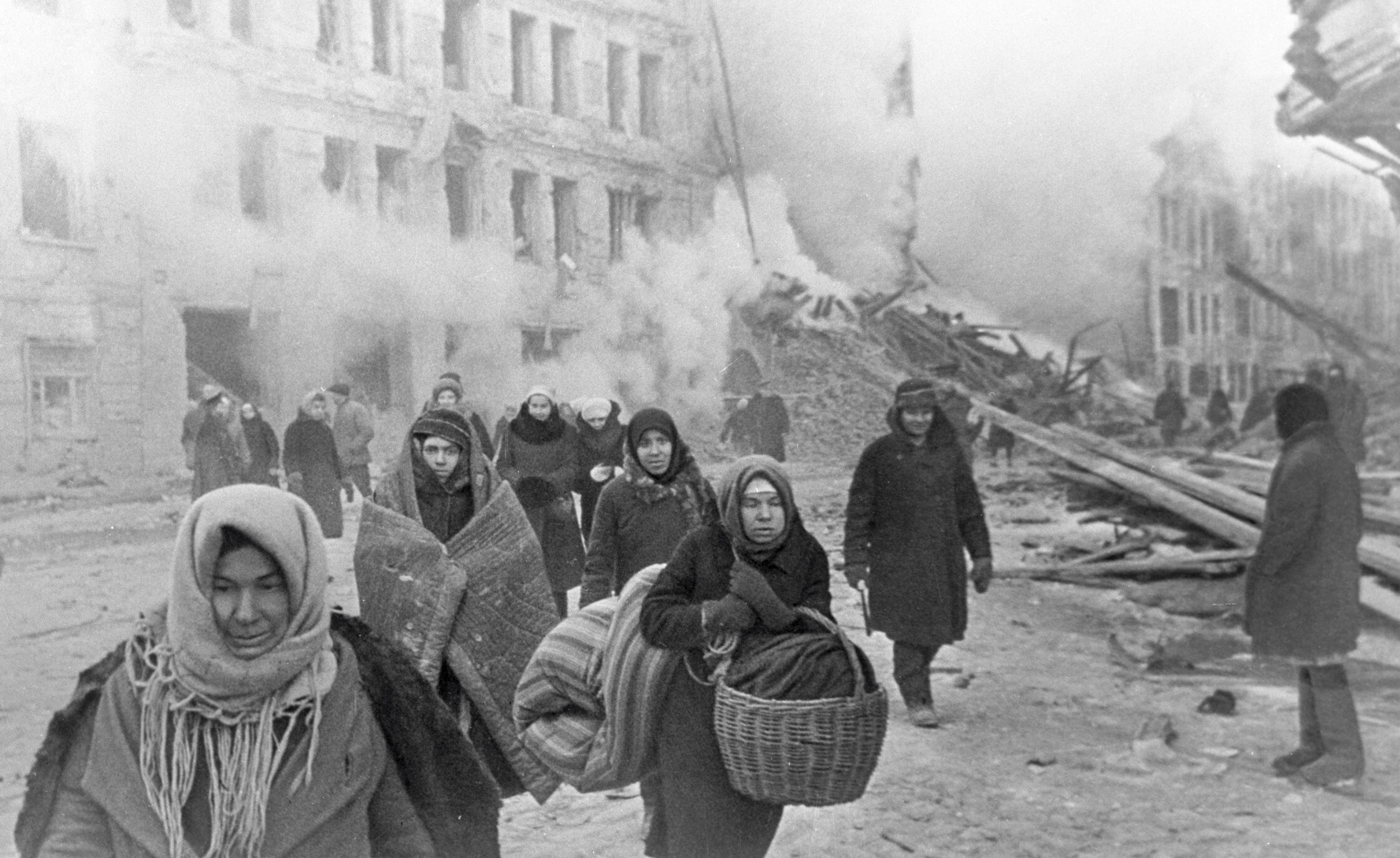
Russian civilians leaving destroyed houses after a German bombardment during the siege of Leningrad (Saint Petersburg), 10 December 1942

By October, Axis powers had achieved operational objectives in Ukraine and the Baltic region, with only the sieges of Leningrad and Sevastopol continuing. A major offensive against Moscow was renewed; after two months of fierce battles in increasingly harsh weather, the German army almost reached the outer suburbs of Moscow, where the exhausted troops were forced to suspend the offensive. Large territorial gains were made by Axis forces, but their campaign had failed to achieve its main objectives: two key cities remained in Soviet hands, the Soviet capability to resist was not broken, and the Soviet Union retained a considerable part of its military potential. The blitzkrieg phase of the war in Europe had ended.

By early December, freshly mobilised reserves allowed the Soviets to achieve numerical parity with Axis troops. This, as well as intelligence data which established that a minimal number of Soviet troops in the East would be sufficient to deter any attack by the Japanese Kwantung Army, allowed the Soviets to begin a counter-offensive that started on 5 December all along the front and pushed German troops 100–250 kilometres (62–155 mi) west.

=== War breaks out in the Pacific (1941) ===
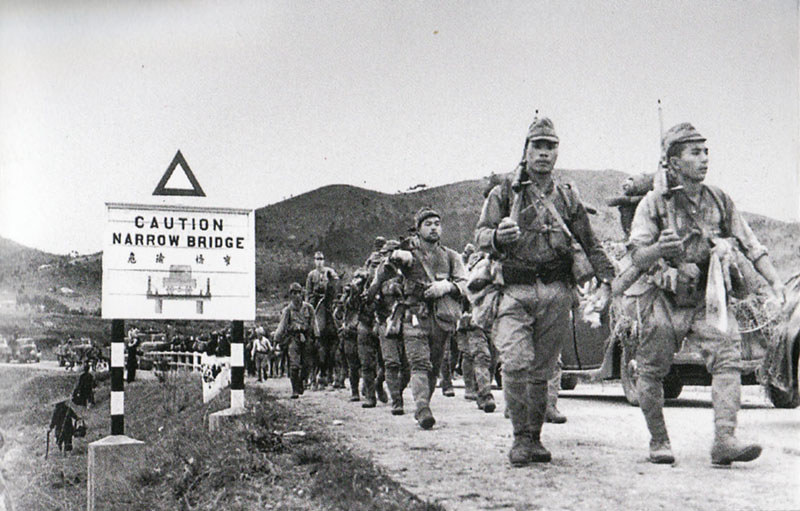
Japanese soldiers entering Hong Kong, 8 December 1941

Following the Japanese false flag Mukden incident in 1931, the Japanese shelling of the American gunboat USS Panay in 1937, and the 1937–1938 Nanjing massacre, Japanese-American relations deteriorated. In 1939, the United States notified Japan that it would not be extending its trade treaty and American public opinion opposing Japanese expansionism led to a series of economic sanctions—the Export Control Acts—which banned US exports of chemicals, minerals and military parts to Japan, and increased economic pressure on the Japanese regime. During 1939 Japan launched its first attack against Changsha, but was repulsed by late September. Despite several offensives by both sides, by 1940 the war between China and Japan was at a stalemate. To increase pressure on China by blocking supply routes, and to better position Japanese forces in the event of a war with the Western powers, Japan invaded and occupied northern Indochina in September 1940.

Chinese nationalist forces launched a large-scale counter-offensive in early 1940. In August, Chinese communists launched an offensive in Central China; in retaliation, Japanese armies in North China implemented the Three Alls policy, a scorched earth initiative to depopulate regions deemed hostile to Japanese occupation. Continued antipathy between Chinese communist and nationalist forces culminated in armed clashes in January 1941, effectively ending their co-operation. In March, the Japanese 11th army attacked the headquarters of the nationalist Chinese 19th army but was repulsed during the Battle of Shanggao. In September, Japan attempted to take the city of Changsha again and clashed with Chinese nationalist forces.

German successes in Europe prompted Japan to increase pressure on European governments in Southeast Asia. The Dutch government agreed to provide Japan with oil supplies from the Dutch East Indies, but negotiations for additional access to their resources ended in failure in June 1941. In July 1941, Japan sent troops to southern Indochina, threatening British and Dutch possessions in the Far East. The United States, the United Kingdom and other Western governments reacted to this move with a freeze on Japanese assets and a total oil embargo. At the same time, Japan was planning an invasion of the Soviet Far East, intending to take advantage of the German invasion in the west, but abandoned the operation after the sanctions.

Since early 1941, the United States and Japan had been engaged in negotiations in an attempt to improve their strained relations and end the war in China. Japan advanced a number of proposals which were dismissed by the Americans as inadequate. At the same time the United States, the United Kingdom, and the Netherlands engaged in secret discussions for the joint defence of their territories, in the event of a Japanese attack against any of them. Roosevelt reinforced the Philippines (an American protectorate scheduled for independence in 1946) and warned Japan that the United States would react to Japanese attacks against any "neighboring countries".

Frustrated at the lack of progress and pressured by American–British–Dutch sanctions, especially in oil, Japan prepared for war. Emperor Hirohito, after initial hesitation about Japan's chances of victory, began to favour Japan's entry into the war. As a result, Prime Minister Fumimaro Konoe resigned. Hirohito refused the recommendation to appoint Prince Naruhiko Higashikuni in his place, choosing War Minister Hideki Tojo instead. On 3 November, Osami Nagano explained in detail the plan of the attack on Pearl Harbor to the Emperor. On 5 November, Hirohito approved in imperial conference the operations plan for the war. On 20 November, the new government presented an interim proposal as its final offer. It called for the end of American aid to China and for lifting the embargo on the supply of oil and other resources to Japan. In exchange, Japan promised not to launch any attacks in Southeast Asia and to withdraw its forces from southern Indochina. The American counter-proposal of 26 November required that Japan evacuate all of China without conditions and conclude non-aggression pacts with all Pacific powers. That meant Japan was essentially forced to choose between abandoning its ambitions in China, or seizing the natural resources it needed in the Dutch East Indies by force; the Japanese military did not consider the former an option, and many officers considered the oil embargo an unspoken declaration of war.

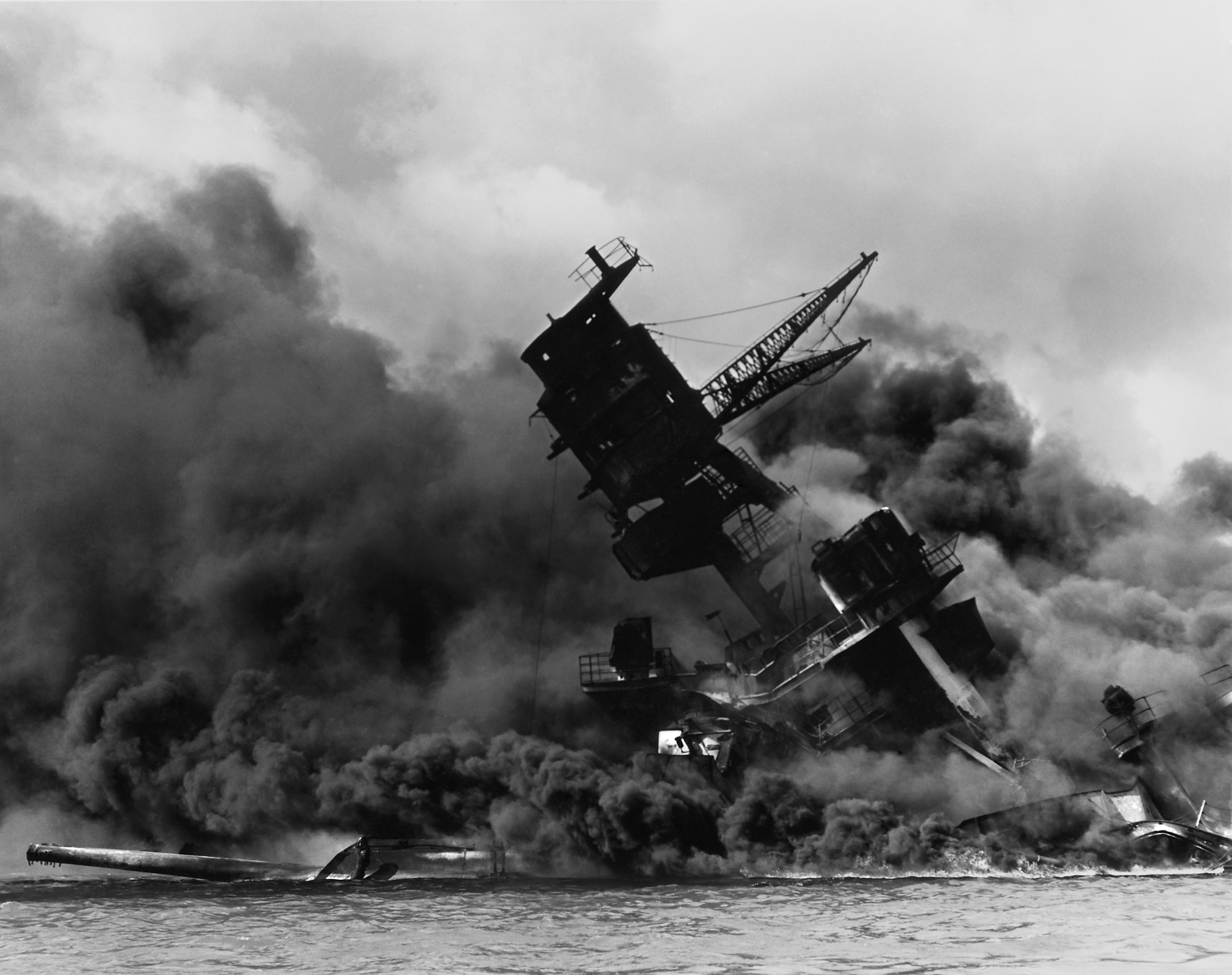
The USS Arizona was a total loss in the Japanese surprise air attack on the United States Pacific Fleet at Pearl Harbor, Sunday 7 December 1941

Japan planned to seize European colonies in Asia to create a large defensive perimeter stretching into the Central Pacific. The Japanese would then be free to exploit the resources of Southeast Asia while exhausting the over-stretched Allies by fighting a defensive war. To prevent American intervention while securing the perimeter, it was further planned to neutralise the United States Pacific Fleet and the American military presence in the Philippines from the outset. On 7 December 1941 (8 December in Asian time zones), Japan attacked British and American holdings with near-simultaneous offensives against Southeast Asia and the Central Pacific. These included an attack on the American fleets at Pearl Harbor and the Philippines, as well as invasions of Guam, Wake Island, Malaya, Thailand, and Hong Kong.

These attacks led the United States, United Kingdom, China, Australia, and several other states to formally declare war on Japan, whereas the Soviet Union, being heavily involved in large-scale hostilities with European Axis countries, maintained its neutrality agreement with Japan. Germany, followed by the other Axis states, declared war on the United States in solidarity with Japan, citing as justification the American attacks on German war vessels that had been ordered by Roosevelt.

=== Axis advance stalls (1942–1943) ===
On 1 January 1942, the Allied Big Four—the Soviet Union, China, the United Kingdom, and the United States—and 22 smaller or exiled governments issued the Declaration by United Nations, thereby affirming the Atlantic Charter and agreeing not to sign a separate peace with the Axis powers.

During 1942, Allied officials debated on the appropriate grand strategy to pursue. All agreed that defeating Germany was the primary objective. The Americans favoured a straightforward, large-scale attack on Germany through France. The Soviets demanded a second front. The British argued that military operations should target peripheral areas to wear out German strength, leading to increasing demoralisation, and bolstering resistance forces; Germany itself would be subject to a heavy bombing campaign. An offensive against Germany would then be launched primarily by Allied armour, without using large-scale armies. Eventually, the British persuaded the Americans that a landing in France was infeasible in 1942 and they should instead focus on driving the Axis out of North Africa.

At the Casablanca Conference in early 1943, the Allies reiterated the statements issued in the 1942 Declaration and demanded the unconditional surrender of their enemies. The British and Americans agreed to continue to press the initiative in the Mediterranean by invading Sicily to fully secure the Mediterranean supply routes. Although the British argued for further operations in the Balkans to bring Turkey into the war, in May 1943, the Americans extracted a British commitment to limit Allied operations in the Mediterranean to an invasion of the Italian mainland, and to invade France in 1944.

=== Pacific (1942–1943) ===
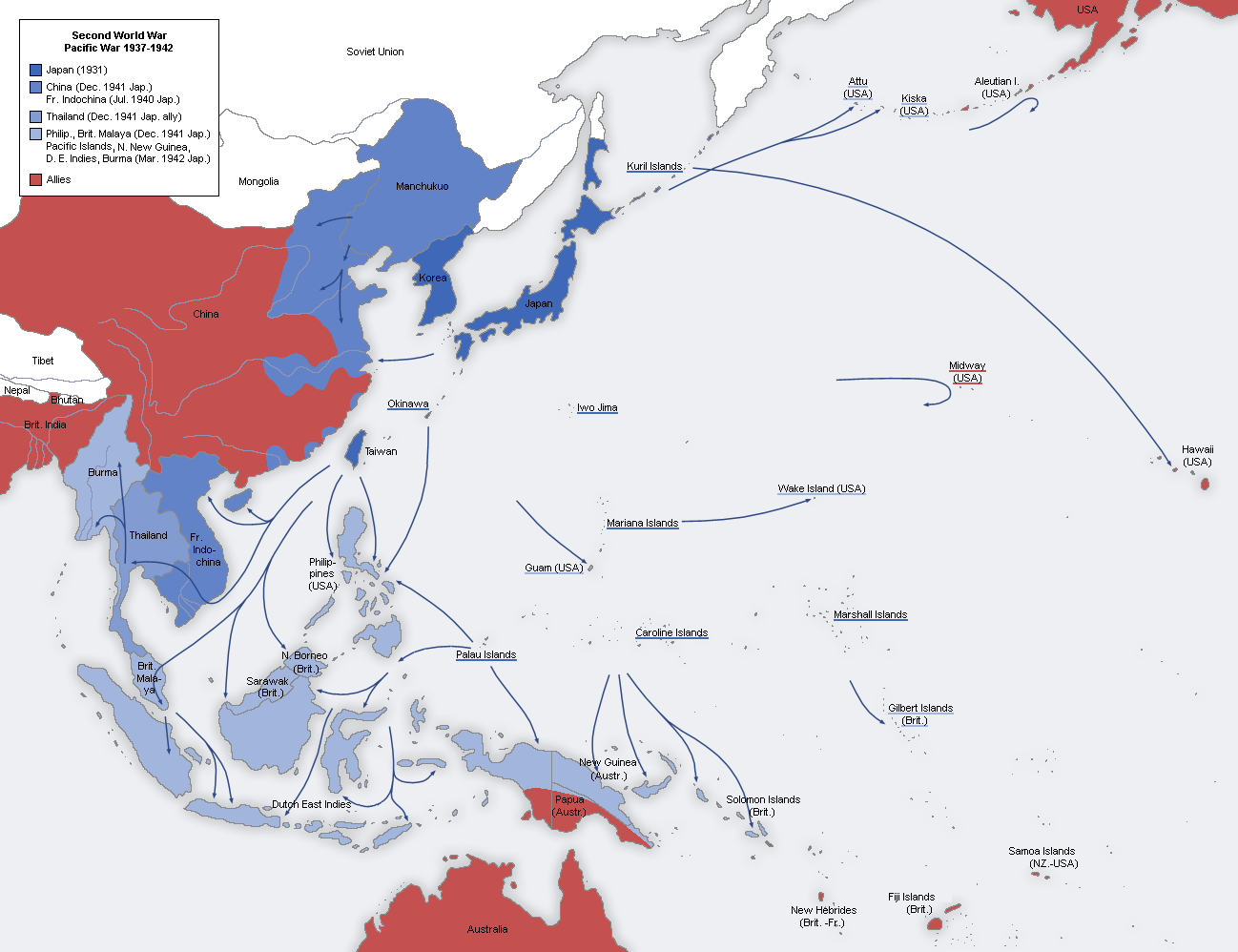
Map of Japanese military advances through mid-1942

Japanese forces achieved naval victories in the South China Sea, Java Sea, and Indian Ocean, and bombed the Allied naval base at Darwin, Australia. On 16 April, 7,000 British soldiers were encircled by the Japanese 33rd Division during the Battle of Yenangyaung in Burma and rescued by the Chinese 38th Division. Despite stubborn resistance by Filipino and US forces, the Philippine Commonwealth was eventually captured in May, forcing its government into exile. Following the capture of Bataan, Japanese armies forced some 75,000 Filipino and American prisoners on a 42km death march, resulting in thousands of deaths.

By the end of April, Japan and its ally Thailand had conquered Malaya, the Dutch East Indies, Singapore, Rabaul, and most of Burma, inflicting severe losses on Allied troops and taking a large number of prisoners. Japanese advances were accompanied by numerous atrocities, including the Sook Ching massacre in Singapore. The only Allied success against Japan was a Chinese victory at Changsha. The Japanese victories left it overconfident and overextended.

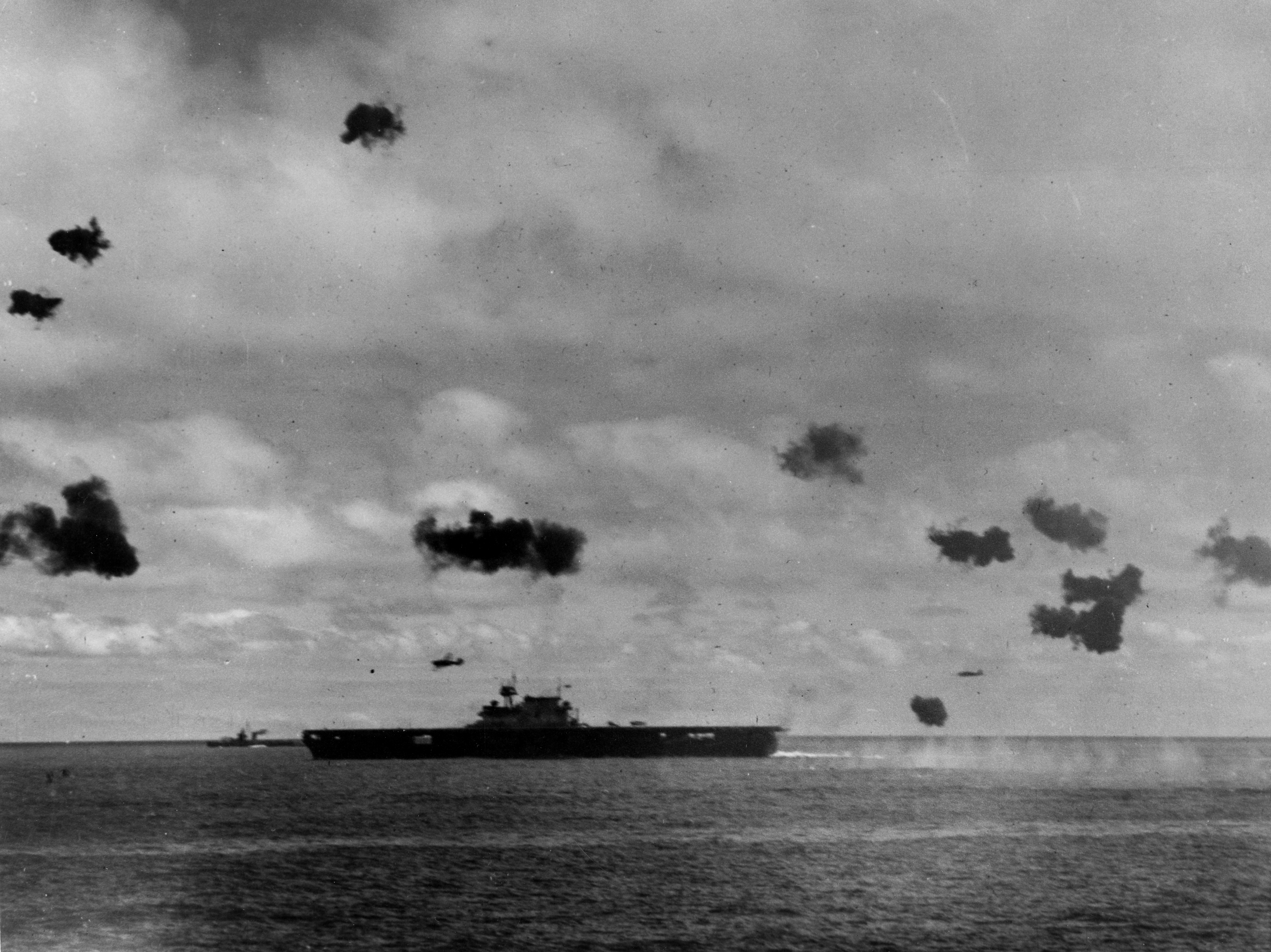
Japanese torpedo bombers fly past the USS Yorktown during the Battle of Midway, 4 June 1942

In early May 1942, Japan initiated operations to capture Port Moresby by amphibious assault and thus sever communications and supply lines between the United States and Australia. The planned invasion was thwarted when an Allied task force, centred on two American fleet carriers, fought Japanese naval forces to a draw in the Battle of the Coral Sea. Japan's next plan, motivated by the earlier Doolittle Raid, was to seize Midway Atoll and lure American carriers into battle to be eliminated; as a diversion, Japan would also send forces to occupy the Aleutian Islands in Alaska. In mid-May, Japan started the Zhejiang-Jiangxi campaign in China, with the goal of inflicting retribution on the Chinese who aided the surviving American airmen in the Doolittle Raid by destroying Chinese air bases and fighting against the Chinese 23rd and 32nd Army Groups. In early June, Japan put its operations into action, but the Americans had broken Japanese naval codes in late May and were fully aware of the plans and order of battle, and used this knowledge to achieve a decisive victory at Midway over the Imperial Japanese Navy.

With its capacity for aggressive action greatly diminished as a result of the Midway battle, Japan attempted to capture Port Moresby by an overland campaign in the Territory of Papua. The Americans planned a counterattack against Japanese positions in the southern Solomon Islands, primarily Guadalcanal, as a first step towards capturing Rabaul, the main Japanese base in the South Pacific.

Both plans started in July, but by mid-September, the Battle for Guadalcanal took priority for the Japanese, and troops in New Guinea were ordered to withdraw from the Port Moresby area to the northern part of the island, where they faced Australian and United States troops in the Battle of Buna–Gona. Guadalcanal soon became a focal point for both sides with heavy commitments of troops and ships in the battle for Guadalcanal, with Japanese forces suffering attrition among their elite pilots. By the start of 1943, the Japanese were defeated on the island and withdrew their troops. In Burma, Commonwealth forces mounted two operations. The first was a disastrous offensive into the Arakan region in late 1942 that forced a retreat back to India by May 1943. The second was the insertion of irregular forces behind Japanese frontlines in February which, by the end of April, had achieved mixed results.

=== Eastern Front (1942–1943) ===
Despite considerable losses, in early 1942 Germany and its allies stopped a major Soviet offensive in central and southern Russia, keeping most territorial gains they had achieved during the previous year. In May, the Germans defeated Soviet offensives in the Kerch Peninsula and at Kharkov. The fortress city of Sevastopol, which the Red Army had held out against Axis siege for nearly 250 days, was finally seized with the use of massive artillery bombardments and toxic smoke.

In June 1942 Germany launched its main summer offensive against southern Russia, to seize the oil fields of the Caucasus and occupy the Kuban steppe, while maintaining positions on the northern and central areas of the front. The Germans split Army Group South into two groups: Army Group A advanced to the lower Don River and struck south-east towards the oil fields, while Army Group B headed towards the Volga River, to protect the strategic flank and to cut Soviet communications. The Soviet Union decided to make its stand at Stalingrad on the Volga.

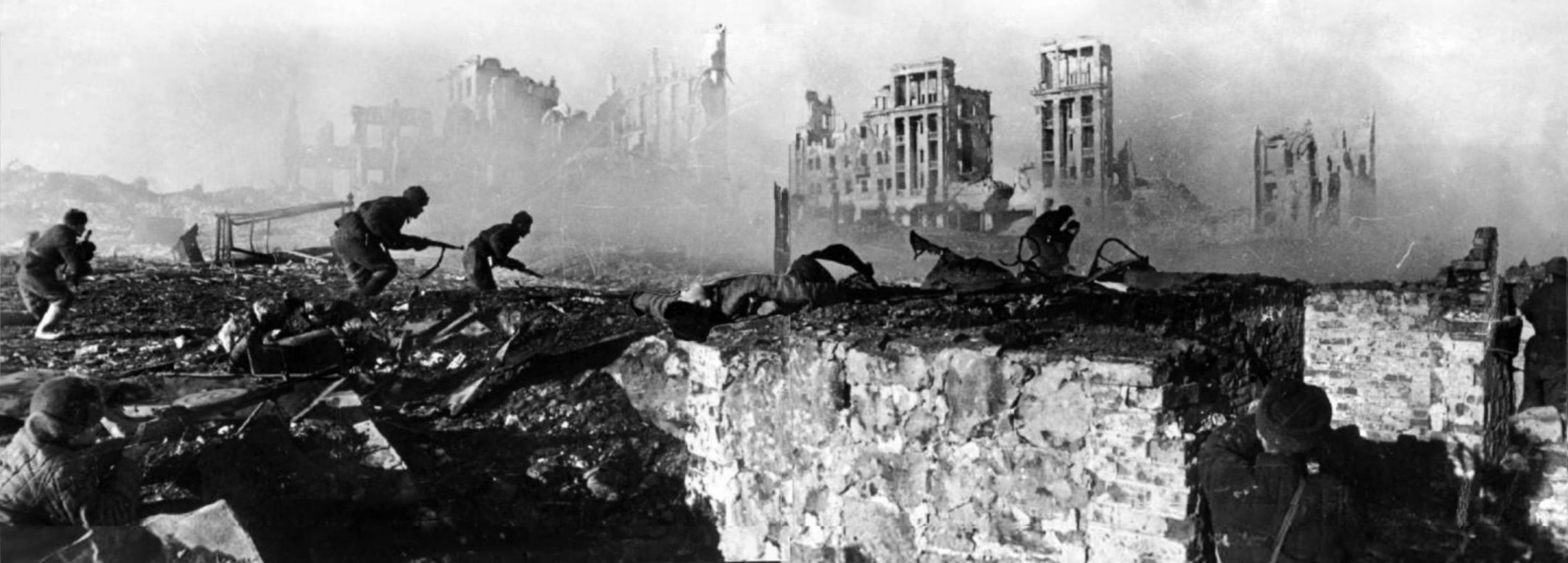
Red Army soldiers on the counterattack during the Battle of Stalingrad, February 1943

By mid-November, the Germans had nearly taken Stalingrad in bitter street fighting. The Soviet Union began its second winter counter-offensive, starting with an encirclement of the German Sixth Army at Stalingrad, and an assault on the Rzhev salient near Moscow, though the latter failed. By early February 1943, the isolated, starving German troops at Stalingrad had been forced to surrender, and the front-line had been pushed back beyond its position before the summer offensive. In mid-February, after the Soviet push had tapered off, the Germans launched another attack on Kharkov, creating a salient in their front line around the Soviet city of Kursk.

=== Western Europe/Atlantic and Mediterranean (1942–1943) ===
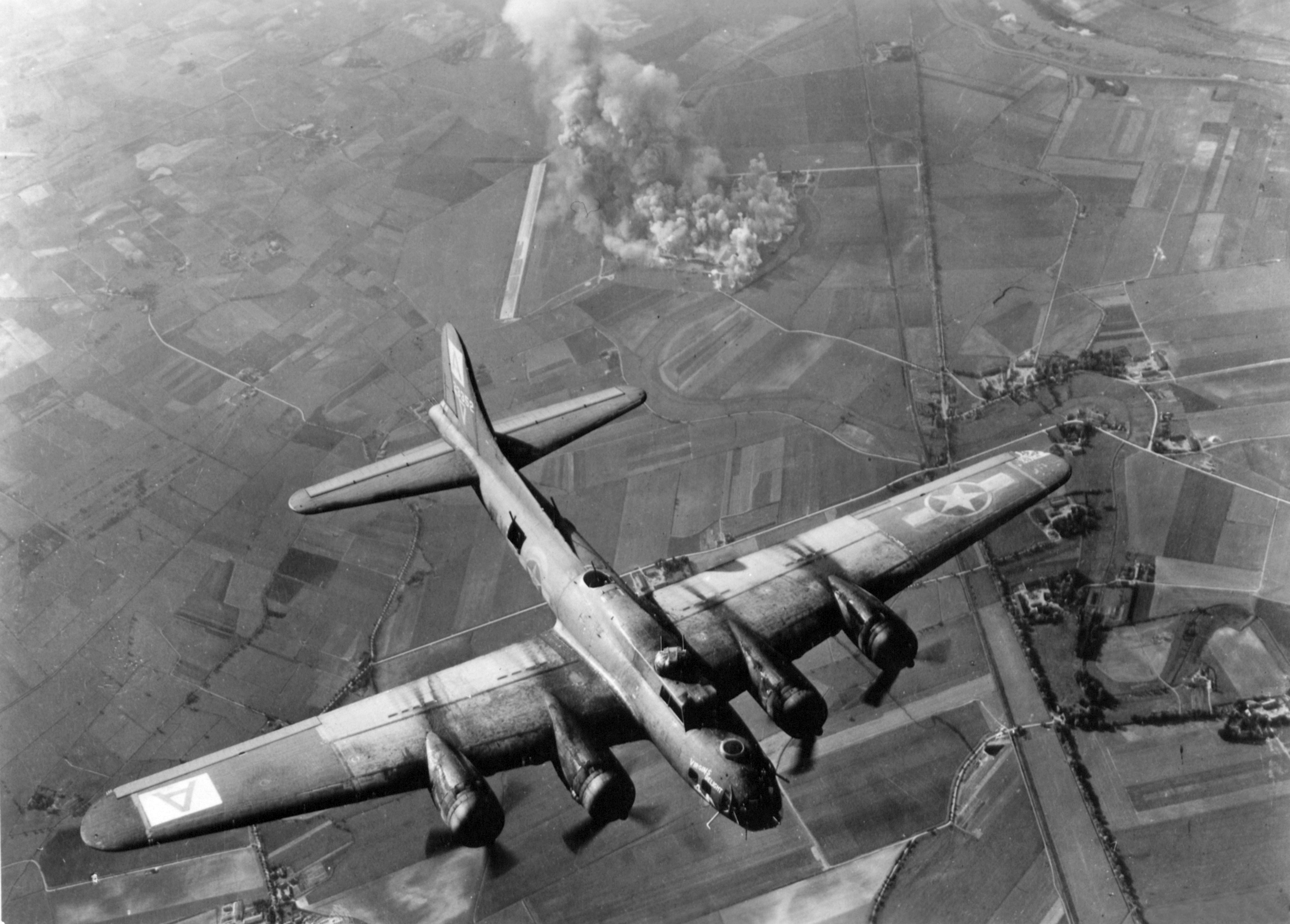
American Eighth Air Force Boeing B-17 Flying Fortress bombing raid on the Focke-Wulf factory in Germany, 9 October 1943

Exploiting poor American naval command decisions, the German navy ravaged Allied shipping off the American Atlantic coast. The Germans launched a North African offensive in January 1942, pushing the British back to positions at the Gazala line by early February, followed by a temporary lull in combat which Germany used to prepare for their upcoming offensives. Concerns that the Japanese might use bases in Vichy-held Madagascar caused the British to invade the island in early May 1942. An Axis offensive in Libya forced an Allied retreat deep inside Egypt until Axis forces were stopped at El Alamein. On the Continent, raids of Allied commandos on strategic targets, culminating in the failed Dieppe Raid, demonstrated the Western Allies' inability to launch an invasion of continental Europe without much better preparation, equipment, and operational security.

In August 1942, the Allies succeeded in repelling a second attack against El Alamein and, at a high cost, managed to deliver desperately needed supplies to the besieged Malta. A few months later, the Allies commenced an attack of their own in Egypt, dislodging the Axis forces and beginning a drive west across Libya. This attack was followed up shortly after by Anglo-American landings in French North Africa, which resulted in the region joining the Allies. Hitler responded to the French colony's defection by ordering the occupation of Vichy France; although Vichy forces did not resist this violation of the armistice, they managed to scuttle their fleet to prevent its capture by German forces. Axis forces in Africa withdrew into Tunisia, which was conquered by the Allies in May 1943. German operations in the Atlantic also suffered. By May 1943, as Allied counter-measures became increasingly effective, the resulting sizeable German submarine losses forced a temporary halt of the German Atlantic naval campaign.

In June 1943, the British and Americans began a strategic bombing campaign against Germany with a goal to disrupt the war economy, reduce morale, and "de-house" the civilian population. The firebombing of Hamburg was among the first attacks in this campaign, inflicting significant casualties and considerable losses on infrastructure of this important industrial centre.

=== Allies gain momentum (1943–1944) ===
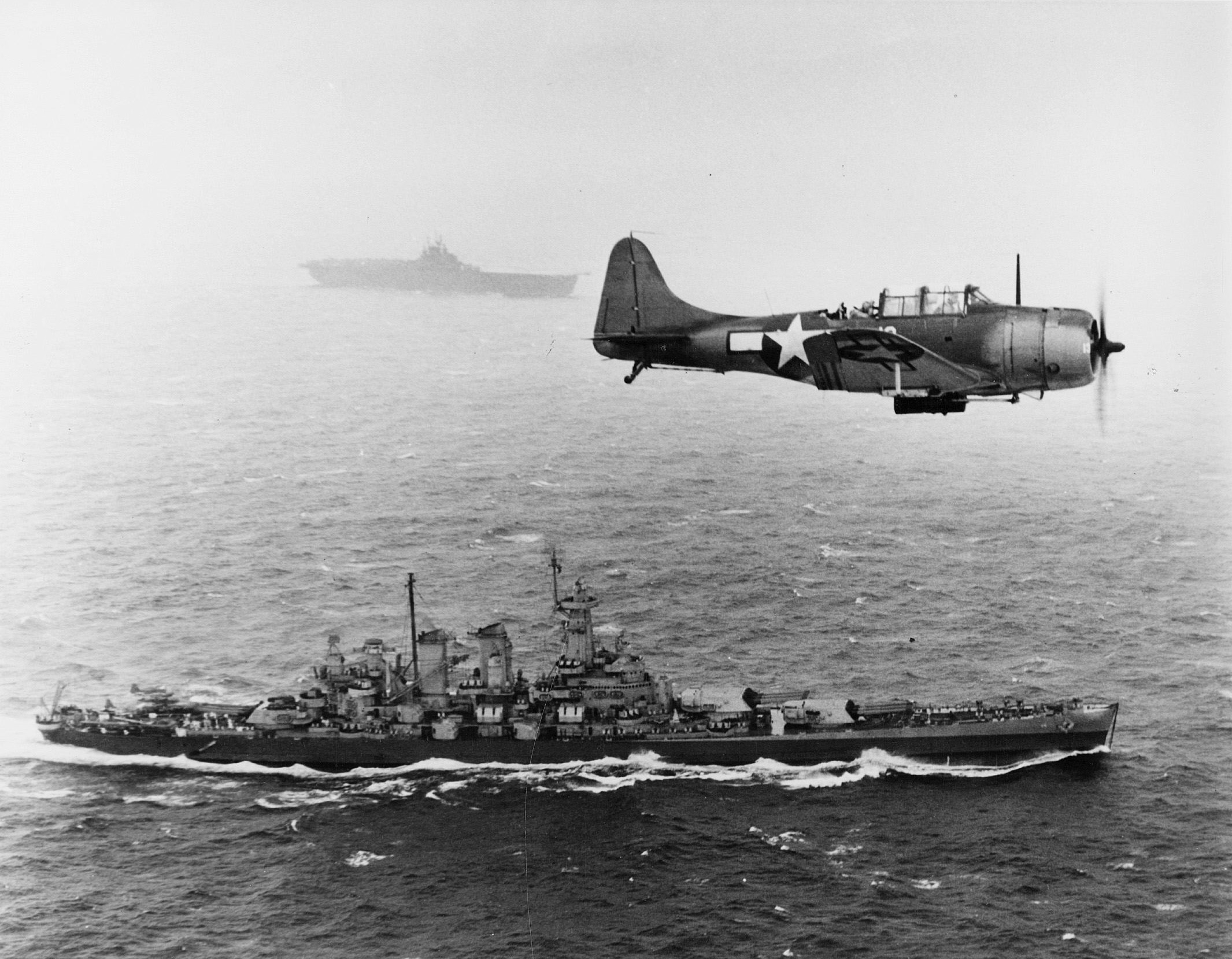
US Navy SBD-5 scout/dive bomber flying patrol over USS Washington and USS Lexington during the Gilbert and Marshall Islands campaign, 1943

After the Guadalcanal campaign, the Allies initiated several operations against Japan in the Pacific. In May 1943, Canadian and US forces were sent to eliminate Japanese forces from the Aleutians. Soon after, the United States, with support from Australia, New Zealand, and Pacific Islander forces, began major ground, sea and air operations to isolate Rabaul by capturing surrounding islands, and breach the Japanese Central Pacific perimeter at the Gilbert and Marshall Islands. By the end of March 1944, the Allies had completed both of these objectives and had also neutralised the major Japanese base at Truk in the Caroline Islands. In April, the Allies launched an operation to retake Western New Guinea.

In the Soviet Union, both the Germans and the Soviets spent the spring and early summer of 1943 preparing for large offensives in central Russia. On 5 July 1943, Germany attacked Soviet forces around the Kursk Bulge. Within a week, German forces had exhausted themselves against the Soviets' well-constructed defences, and for the first time in the war, Hitler cancelled an operation before it had achieved tactical or operational success. This decision was partially affected by the Western Allies' invasion of Sicily launched on 9 July, which, combined with previous Italian failures, resulted in the ousting and arrest of Mussolini later that month. The Soviet victory at Kursk marked the end of German superiority, giving the Soviet Union the initiative on the Eastern Front.

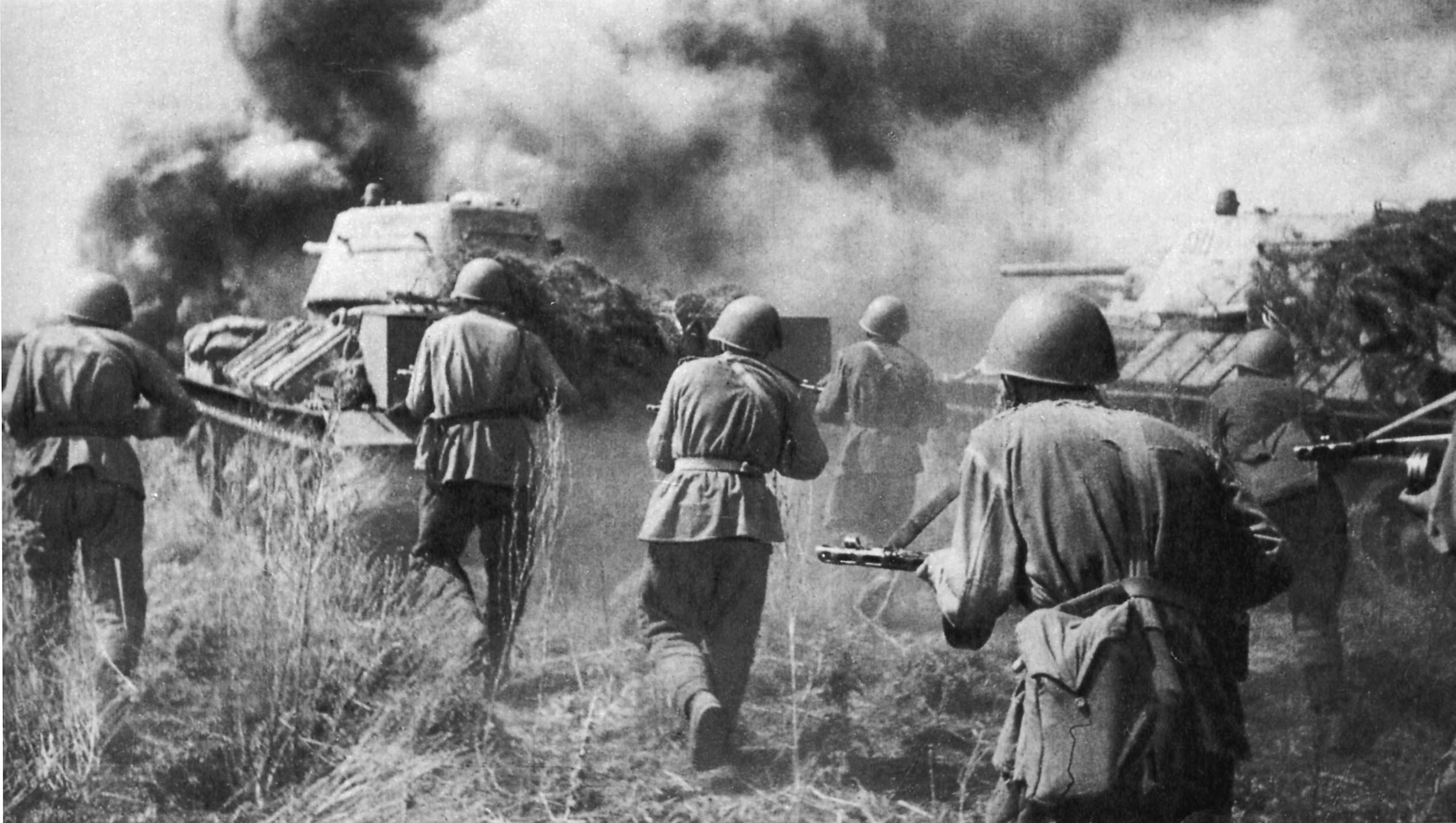
Red Army troops behind T34/76 (1942 variant) in a counter-offensive on German positions at the Battle of Kursk, July 1943

On 12 July 1943, the Soviets launched their own counter-offensives, thereby nearly completely dispelling any chance of German victory or even stalemate in the east. The Germans tried to stabilise their eastern front along the hastily fortified Panther–Wotan line, but the Soviets broke through it at Smolensk and the Lower Dnieper Offensive.

On 3 September 1943, the Western Allies invaded the Italian mainland, following Italy's armistice with the Allies and the ensuing German occupation of Italy. Germany, with the help of local fascists, responded to the armistice by disarming Italian forces that were in many places without superior orders, seizing military control of Italian areas, and creating a series of defensive lines. German special forces then rescued Mussolini, who then soon established a new client state in German-occupied Italy named the Italian Social Republic, causing an Italian civil war. The Western Allies fought through several lines until reaching the main German defensive line in mid-November.

In November 1943, Franklin D. Roosevelt and Winston Churchill met with Chiang Kai-shek in Cairo and then with Joseph Stalin in Tehran. The former conference determined the post-war return of Japanese territory and the military planning for the Burma campaign, while the latter included agreement that the Western Allies would invade Europe in 1944 and that the Soviet Union would declare war on Japan within three months of Germany's defeat.

From November 1943, during the seven-week Battle of Changde, the Chinese awaited Allied relief as they forced Japan to fight a costly war of attrition. In January 1944, the Allies launched a series of attacks in Italy against the line at Monte Cassino and tried to outflank it with landings at Anzio.

On 27 January 1944, Soviet troops launched a major offensive that expelled German forces from the Leningrad region, thereby ending the most lethal siege in history. The following Soviet offensive was halted on the pre-war Estonian border by the German Army Group North aided by Estonians hoping to re-establish national independence. This delay slowed subsequent Soviet operations in the Baltic Sea region. By late May 1944, the Soviets had liberated Crimea, largely expelled Axis forces from Ukraine, and made incursions into Romania, which were repulsed by the Axis troops. The Allied offensives in Italy had succeeded and, at the cost of allowing several German divisions to retreat, Rome was liberated on 4 June.

The Allies had mixed success in mainland Asia. In March 1944, the Japanese launched the first of two invasions, an operation against Allied positions in Assam, India, and soon besieged Commonwealth positions at Imphal and Kohima. In May 1944, British and Indian forces mounted a counter-offensive that drove Japanese troops back to Burma by July, and Chinese forces that had invaded northern Burma in late 1943 besieged Japanese troops in Myitkyina. The second Japanese invasion of China aimed to destroy China's main fighting forces, secure railways between Japanese-held territory and capture Allied airfields. By June, the Japanese had conquered the province of Henan and begun a new attack on Changsha.

=== Allied offensives (1944) ===
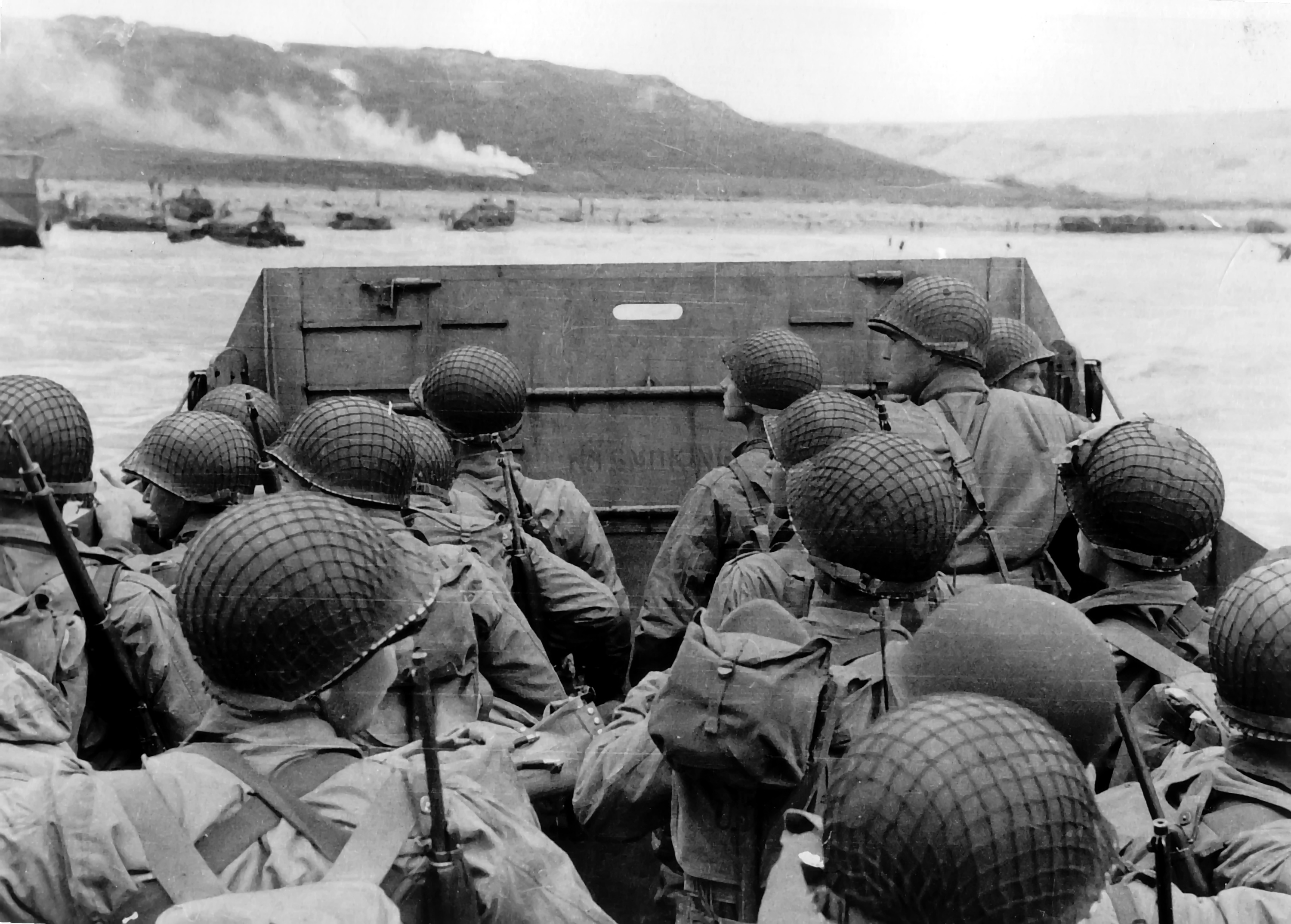
American troops approaching Omaha Beach during the invasion of Normandy on D-Day, 6 June 1944

On 6 June 1944 (commonly known as D-Day), the Allies invaded northern France. After reassigning several Allied divisions from Italy, they also attacked southern France. These landings were successful and led to the defeat of the German Army units in Normandy. The liberation of Paris on 25 August by the local resistance was assisted by the Free French Forces, both led by General Charles de Gaulle, and mobile Allied formations raced across France and Belgium, quickly approaching the Siegfried Line defending Germany. An attempt to advance into northern Germany spearheaded by a major airborne operation in the Netherlands failed. After that, the Western Allies slowly pushed into Germany, but failed to cross the Roer river. In Italy, the Allied advance slowed due to the last major German defensive line.

On 22 June, the Soviets launched a strategic offensive in Belarus that nearly destroyed the German Army Group Centre. Soon after that, another Soviet strategic offensive forced German troops from Western Ukraine and Eastern Poland. The Red Army however halted in the Praga district on the other side of the Vistula as the Germans quelled the Warsaw Uprising initiated by the Home Army (the main faction of the Polish resistance, loyal to the non-communist government-in exile), killing over 150,000 Poles. The national uprising in Slovakia was also quelled by the Germans. The Soviet Red Army's strategic offensive in eastern Romania cut off and destroyed the considerable German troops there and triggered a successful coup d'état in Romania and in Bulgaria, followed by those countries' shift to the Allied side.

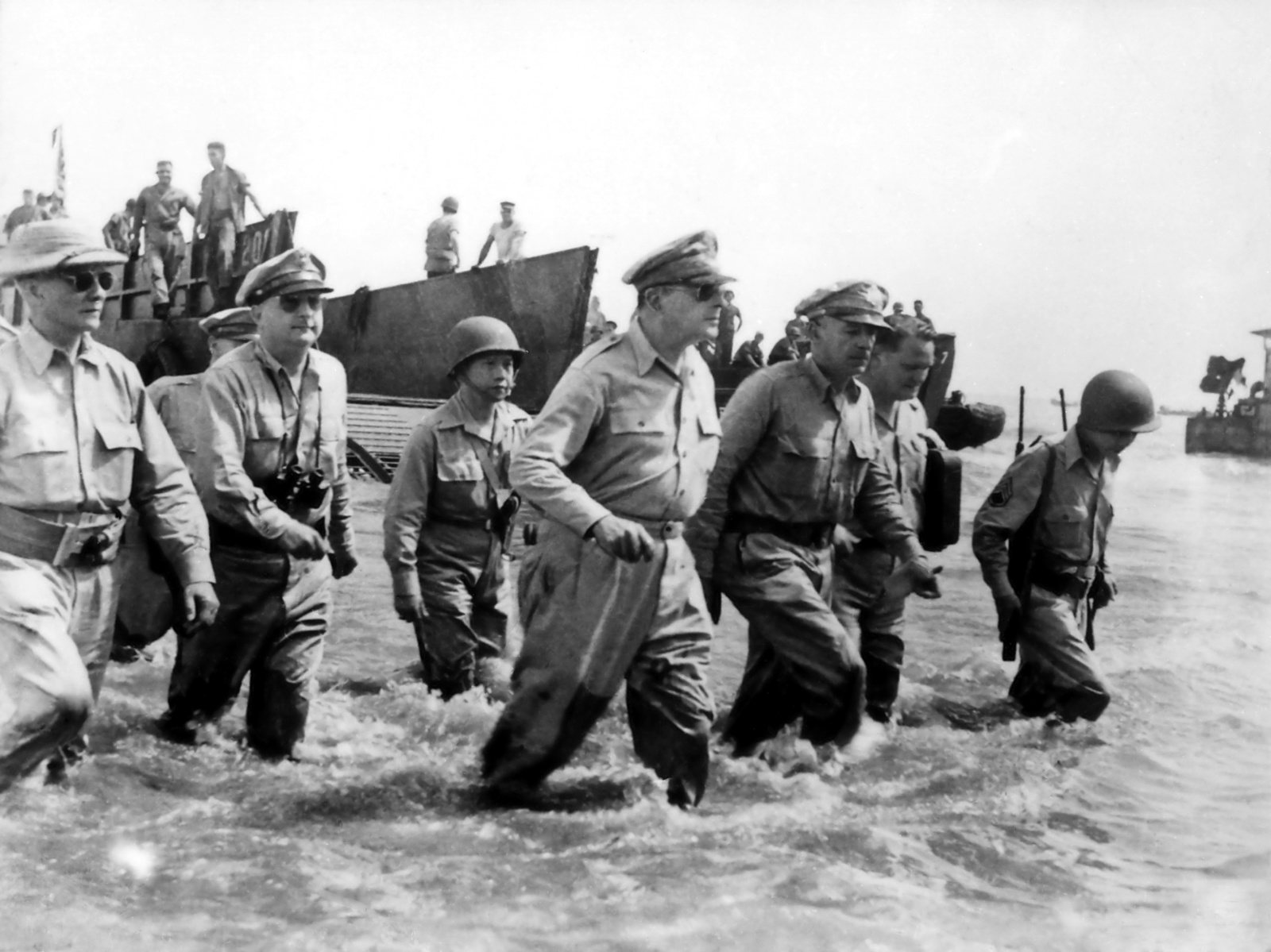
General Douglas MacArthur returns to the Philippines during the Battle of Leyte, 20 October 1944

In September 1944, Soviet troops advanced into Yugoslavia and forced the rapid withdrawal of German Army Groups E and F in Greece, Albania, and Yugoslavia to rescue them from being cut off. By this point, the communist-led Partisans under Marshal Josip Broz Tito, who had led an increasingly successful guerrilla campaign against the occupation since 1941, controlled much of the territory of Yugoslavia and engaged in delaying efforts against German forces further south. In northern Serbia, the Soviet Red Army, with limited support from Bulgarian forces, assisted the Partisans in a joint liberation of the capital city of Belgrade on 20 October. A few days later, the Soviets launched an assault against German-occupied Hungary that lasted until the fall of Budapest in February 1945. Unlike rapid Soviet victories in the Balkans, bitter Finnish resistance to the Soviet offensive in the Karelian Isthmus denied the Soviets occupation of Finland and led to a Soviet-Finnish armistice on relatively mild conditions, although Finland was obligated to fight their German former allies.

By the start of July 1944, Commonwealth forces in Southeast Asia had repelled the Japanese sieges in Assam, pushing the Japanese back to the Chindwin River while the Chinese captured Myitkyina. In September 1944, Chinese forces captured Mount Song and reopened the Burma Road. In China, the Japanese had more successes, having finally captured Changsha in mid-June and the city of Hengyang by early August. Soon after, they invaded the province of Guangxi, winning major engagements against Chinese forces at Guilin and Liuzhou by the end of November and successfully linking up their forces in China and Indochina by mid-December.

In the Pacific, US forces continued to push back the Japanese perimeter. In mid-June 1944, they began their offensive against the Mariana and Palau islands and decisively defeated Japanese forces in the Battle of the Philippine Sea. These defeats led to the resignation of the Japanese Prime Minister, Hideki Tojo, and provided the United States with air bases to launch intensive heavy bomber attacks on the Japanese home islands. In late October, American forces invaded the Filipino island of Leyte; soon after, Allied naval forces scored another large victory in the Battle of Leyte Gulf, one of the largest naval battles in history.

=== Axis collapse and Allied victory (1944–1945) ===
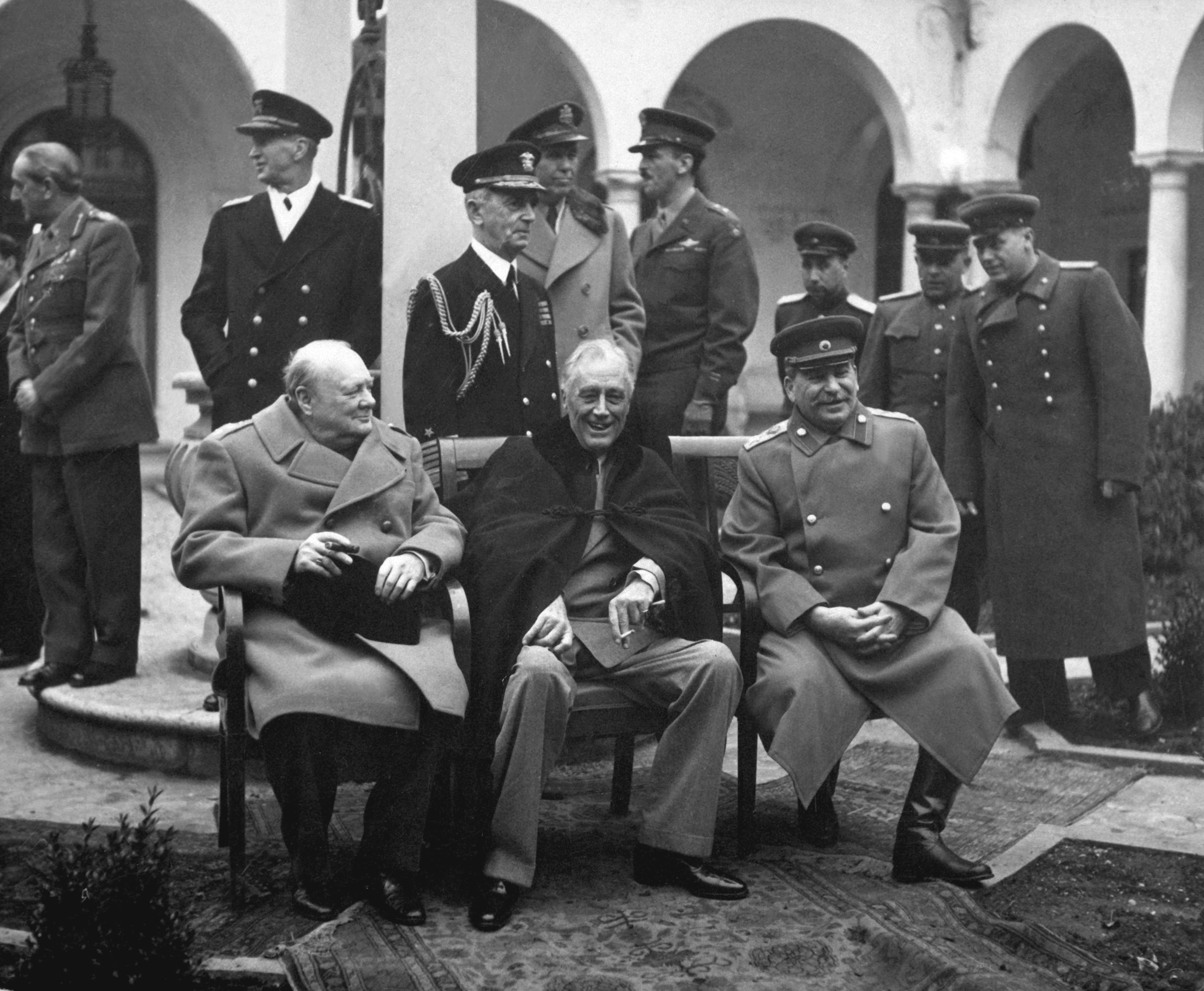
Yalta Conference held in February 1945, with Winston Churchill, Franklin D. Roosevelt, and Joseph Stalin

On 16 December 1944, Germany launched a massive counter-offensive in the Ardennes and along the French-German border, hoping to encircle large numbers of Allied troops and prompt a political settlement after capturing their primary supply port at Antwerp. By 16 January 1945, this offensive had been repulsed with no strategic objectives fulfilled. In Italy, the Western Allies remained stalemated at the German defensive line. In mid-January 1945, the Red Army attacked in Poland, pushing from the Vistula to the Oder river in Germany, and overran East Prussia. On 4 February, Soviet, British, and US leaders met for the Yalta Conference. They agreed on the occupation of post-war Germany, and on when the Soviet Union would join the war against Japan.

In February, the Soviets entered Silesia and Pomerania, while the Western Allies entered western Germany and closed to the Rhine River. By March, the Western Allies crossed the Rhine north and south of the Ruhr, encircling the German Army Group B. In early March, in an attempt to protect its last oil reserves in Hungary and retake Budapest, Germany launched its last major offensive against Soviet troops near Lake Balaton. Within two weeks, the offensive had been repulsed, the Soviets advanced to Vienna, and captured the city. In early April, Soviet troops captured Königsberg, while the Western Allies finally pushed forward in Italy and swept across western Germany capturing Hamburg and Nuremberg. American and Soviet forces met at the Elbe river on 25 April, leaving unoccupied pockets in southern Germany and around Berlin.

Soviet troops then stormed and captured Berlin in late April. In Italy, German forces surrendered on 29 April, while the Italian Social Republic capitulated two days later. On 30 April, the Reichstag was captured, signalling the military defeat of Nazi Germany.

Major changes in leadership occurred on both sides during this period. On 12 April, President Roosevelt died and was succeeded by his vice-president, Harry S. Truman. Benito Mussolini was killed by Italian partisans on 28 April. On 30 April, Hitler committed suicide in his headquarters, and was succeeded by Admiral Karl Dönitz in Flensburg. Total and unconditional surrender in Europe was signed on 7 and 8 May, to be effective by the end of 8 May. German Army Group Centre resisted in Prague until 11 May. On 23 May, all remaining members of the German government were arrested by Allied forces in Flensburg. On 5 June, all German political and military institutions were placed under Allied control through the Berlin Declaration.

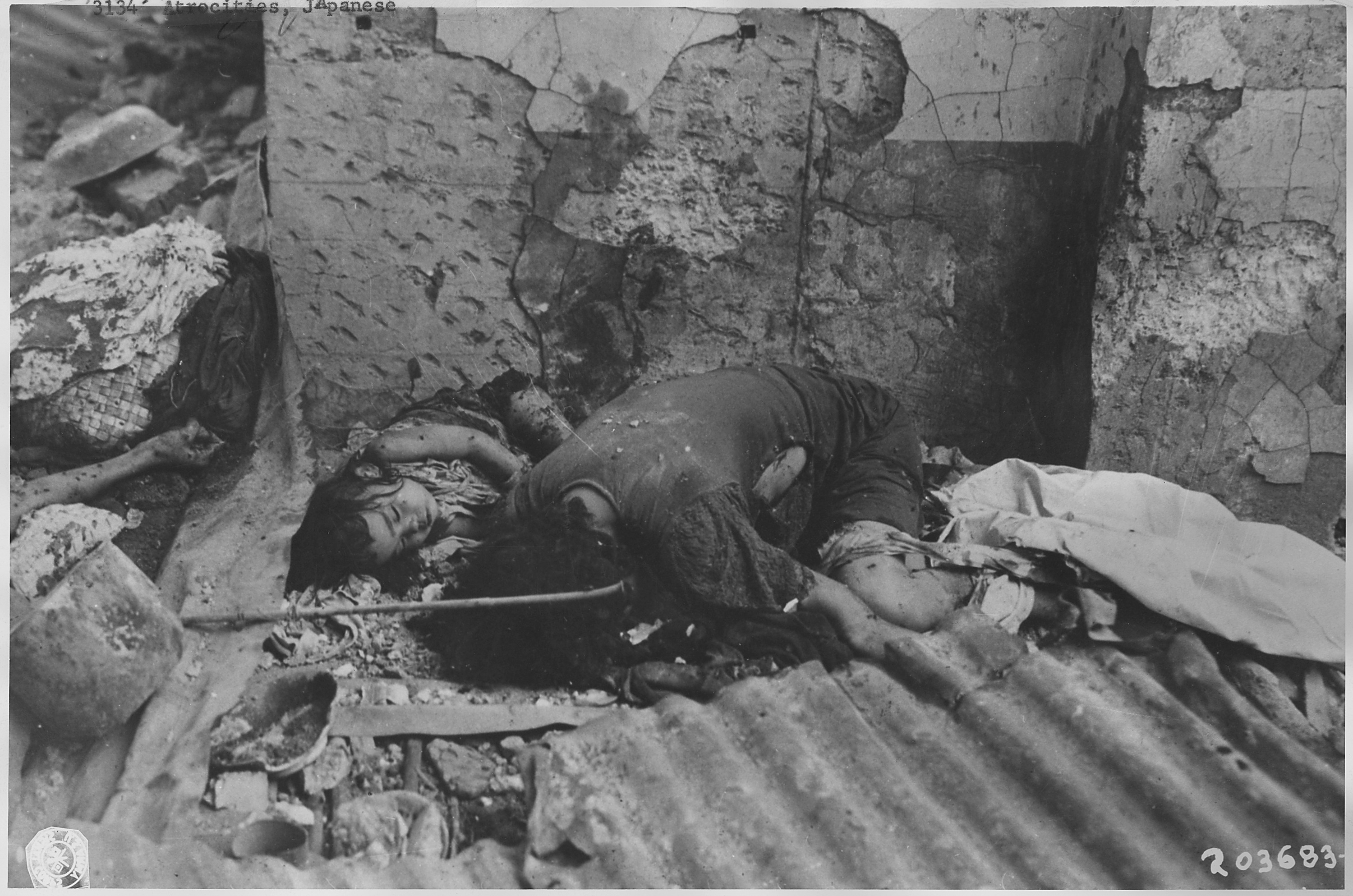
A Filipino woman and child killed by Japanese troops in Manila, 1945

In the Pacific theatre, American forces accompanied by the forces of the Philippine Commonwealth advanced in the Philippines, clearing Leyte by the end of April 1945. They landed on Luzon in January 1945 and recaptured Manila in March, during which Japanese forces killed 100,000 Filipino civilians in the city. Fighting continued on Luzon, Mindanao, and other islands of the Philippines until the end of the war.

Meanwhile, the United States Army Air Forces launched a firebombing campaign of strategic cities in Japan in an effort to destroy Japanese war industry and civilian morale. A devastating bombing raid on Tokyo of 9–10 March was the deadliest conventional bombing raid in history.

In May 1945, Australian troops landed in Borneo, overrunning the oilfields there. British, American, and Chinese forces defeated the Japanese in northern Burma in March, and the British pushed on to reach Rangoon by 3 May. Chinese forces started a counterattack in the Battle of West Hunan that occurred between 6 April and 7 June 1945. American naval and amphibious forces also moved towards Japan, taking Iwo Jima by March, and Okinawa by the end of June. At the same time, a naval blockade by submarines was strangling Japan's economy and drastically reducing its ability to supply overseas forces.

On 11 July, Allied leaders met in Potsdam, Germany. They confirmed earlier agreements about Germany, and the American, British, and Chinese governments reiterated the demand for unconditional surrender of Japan, specifically stating that "the alternative for Japan is prompt and utter destruction". During this conference, the United Kingdom held its general election, and Clement Attlee replaced Churchill as Prime Minister.

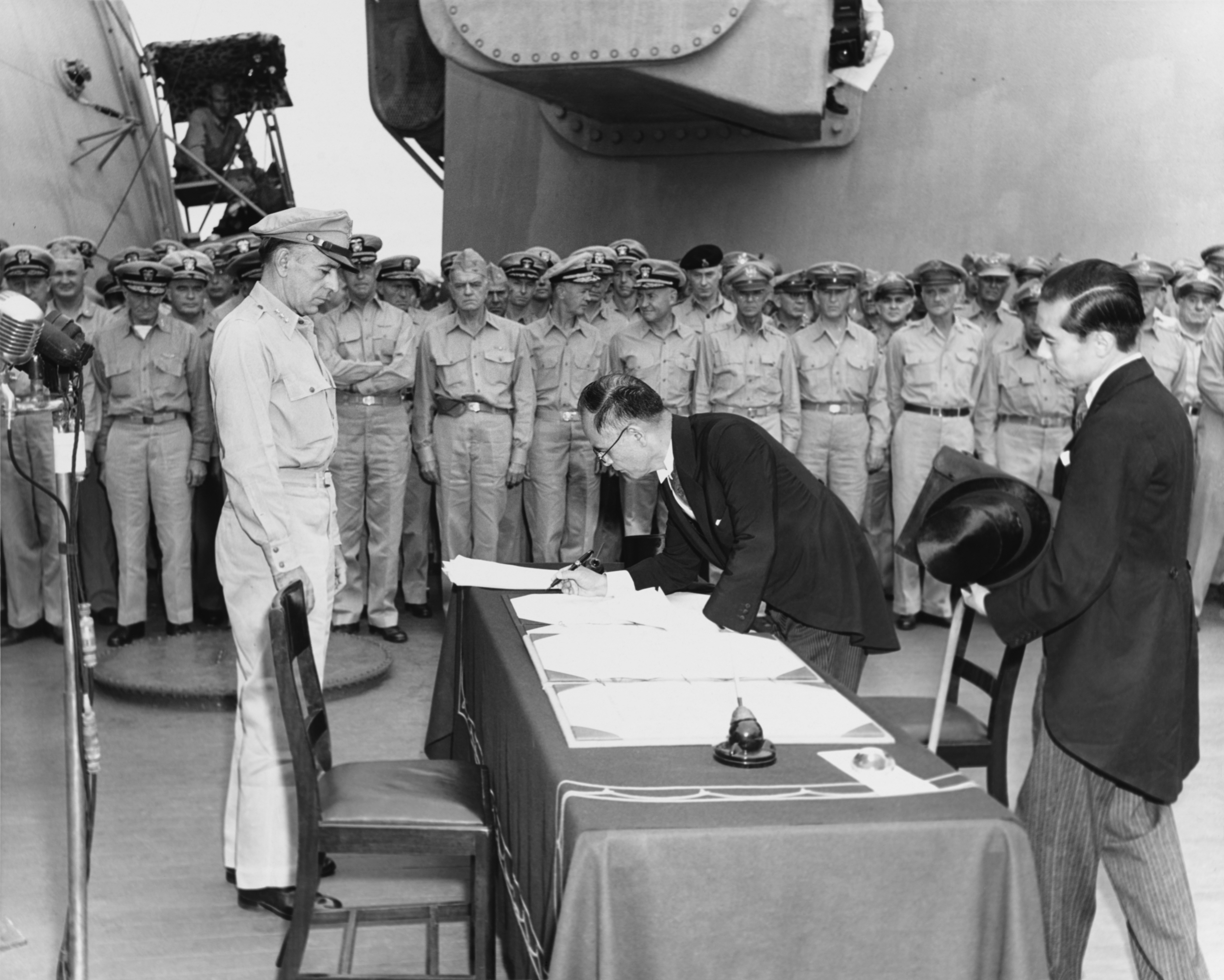
Japanese foreign affairs minister Mamoru Shigemitsu signs the Japanese Instrument of Surrender on board USS Missouri, 2 September 1945

The call for unconditional surrender was rejected by the Japanese government, which believed it would be capable of negotiating for more favourable surrender terms. In early August, the United States dropped atomic bombs on the Japanese cities of Hiroshima and Nagasaki. Between the two bombings, the Soviets, pursuant to the Yalta agreement, declared war on Japan, invaded Japanese-held Manchuria and quickly defeated the Kwantung Army, which was the largest Japanese fighting force. These two events persuaded previously adamant Imperial Army leaders to accept surrender terms. The Red Army also captured the southern part of Sakhalin Island and the Kuril Islands. On the night of 9–10 August 1945, Emperor Hirohito ordered the Japanese cabinet to accept the terms demanded by the Allies in the Potsdam Declaration. On 15 August, the Emperor announced the decision in a recorded radio speech (Gyokuon-hōsō, literally "broadcast in the Emperor's voice"). On 2 September 1945, the surrender documents were signed at Tokyo Bay on the deck of the American battleship USS Missouri.

== Aftermath ==
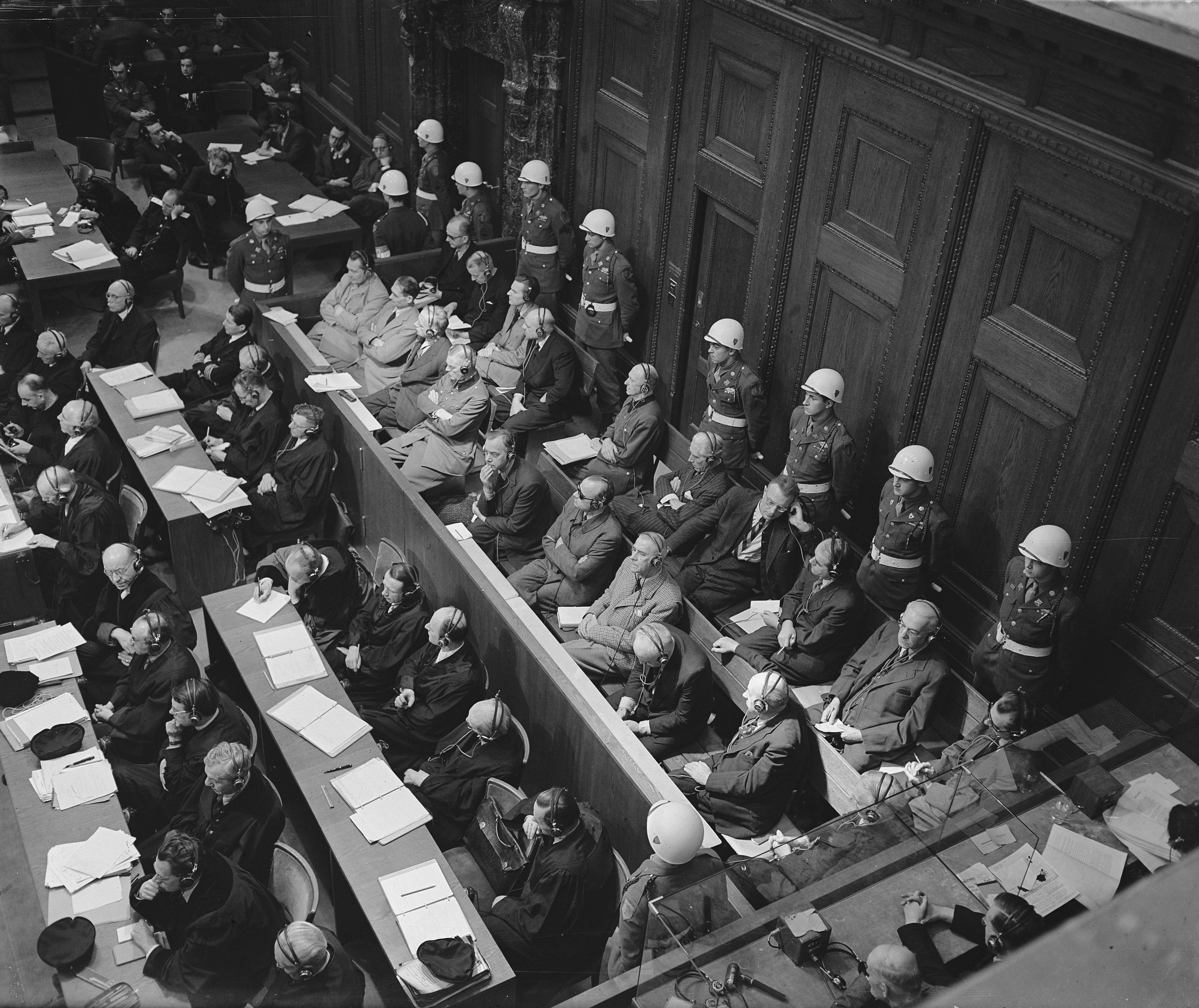
Defendants at the Nuremberg trials, where the Allied forces prosecuted prominent members of the political, military, judicial, and economic leadership of Nazi Germany for crimes against humanity

The Allies established occupation administrations in Austria and Germany, both of which were initially divided between western and eastern occupation zones controlled by the Western Allies and the Soviet Union, respectively. However, their paths soon diverged. In Germany, the western and eastern occupation zones officially ended in 1949, with the respective zones becoming separate countries, West Germany and East Germany. In Austria, however, occupation continued until 1955, when a joint settlement between the Western Allies and the Soviet Union permitted the reunification of Austria as a democratic state officially non-aligned with any political bloc (although in practice having better relations with the Western Allies). A denazification program in Germany led to the prosecution of Nazi war criminals in the Nuremberg trials and the removal of ex-Nazis from power, although this policy moved towards amnesty and re-integration of ex-Nazis into West German society.

Germany lost a quarter of its pre-war (1937) territory. Among the eastern territories, Silesia, Neumark, and most of Pomerania were taken over by Poland, and East Prussia was divided between Poland and the Soviet Union, followed by the expulsion to Germany of the nine million Germans from these provinces, as well as three million Germans from the Sudetenland in Czechoslovakia. By the 1950s, one-fifth of West Germans were refugees from the east. The Soviet Union also took over the Polish provinces east of the Curzon Line, from which two million Poles were expelled. Northeastern Romania, parts of eastern Finland, and the Baltic states were annexed into the Soviet Union. Italy lost its monarchy, colonial empire, and some European territories.

In an effort to maintain world peace, the Allies formed the United Nations, which officially came into existence on 24 October 1945, and adopted the Universal Declaration of Human Rights in 1948 as a common standard for all member nations. The great powers that were the victors of the war—France, China, the United Kingdom, the Soviet Union and the United States—became the permanent members of the UN's Security Council. The five permanent members remain so to the present, although there have been two seat changes, between the Republic of China and the People's Republic of China in 1971, and between the Soviet Union and its successor state, the Russian Federation, following the dissolution of the Soviet Union in 1991. The alliance between the Western Allies and the Soviet Union had begun to deteriorate even before the war was over.

Post-war border changes in Central Europe and creation of the communist Eastern Bloc

Besides Germany, the rest of Europe was also divided into Western and Soviet spheres of influence. Most eastern and central European countries fell into the Soviet sphere, which led to the establishment of communist-led regimes, with full or partial support of the Soviet occupation authorities. As a result, East Germany, Poland, Hungary, Romania, Bulgaria, Czechoslovakia, and Albania became Soviet satellite states. Communist Yugoslavia conducted a fully independent policy, causing tension with the Soviet Union. A communist uprising in Greece was put down with Anglo-American support and the country remained aligned with the West.

Post-war division of the world was formalised by two international military alliances, the United States-led NATO and the Soviet-led Warsaw Pact. The long period of political tensions and military competition between them—the Cold War—would be accompanied by an unprecedented arms race and a number of proxy wars throughout the world.

In Asia, the United States led the occupation of Japan and administered Japan's former islands in the Western Pacific, while the Soviets annexed South Sakhalin and the Kuril Islands. Korea, formerly under Japanese colonial rule, was divided and occupied by the Soviet Union in the North and the United States in the South between 1945 and 1948. Separate republics emerged on both sides of the 38th parallel in 1948, each claiming to be the legitimate government for all of Korea, which led ultimately to the Korean War.

In China, nationalist and communist forces resumed the civil war in June 1946. Communist forces prevailed and established the People's Republic of China on the mainland, while nationalist forces retreated to Taiwan in 1949. In the Middle East, the Arab rejection of the United Nations Partition Plan for Palestine and the creation of Israel marked the escalation of the Arab–Israeli conflict. While European powers attempted to retain some or all of their colonial empires, their losses of prestige and resources during the war rendered this unsuccessful, leading to decolonisation.

The global economy suffered heavily from the war, although participating nations were affected differently. The United States emerged much richer than any other nation, leading to a baby boom, and by 1950 its gross domestic product per person was much greater than that of any of the other powers, and it dominated the world economy. The Allied occupational authorities pursued a policy of industrial disarmament in Western Germany from 1945 to 1948. Due to international trade interdependencies, this policy led to an economic stagnation in Europe and delayed European recovery from the war for several years.

At the Bretton Woods Conference in July 1944, the Allied nations drew up an economic framework for the post-war world. The agreement created the International Monetary Fund (IMF) and the International Bank for Reconstruction and Development (IBRD), which later became part of the World Bank Group. The Bretton Woods system lasted until 1973. Recovery began with the mid-1948 currency reform in West Germany, and was sped up by the liberalisation of European economic policy that the US Marshall Plan economic aid (1948–1951) both directly and indirectly caused. The post-1948 West German recovery has been called the German economic miracle. Italy also experienced an economic boom and the French economy rebounded. By contrast, the United Kingdom was in a state of economic ruin, and although receiving a quarter of the total Marshall Plan assistance, more than any other European country, it continued in relative economic decline for decades. The Soviet Union, despite enormous human and material losses, also experienced rapid increases in production in the immediate post-war era, having seized and transferred most of Germany's industrial plants and exacted war reparations from its satellite states. (Note: Reparations were exacted from East Germany, Hungary, Romania, and Bulgaria using Soviet-dominated joint enterprises. The Soviet Union also instituted trading arrangements deliberately designed to favour the country. Moscow controlled the Communist parties that ruled the satellite states, and they followed orders from the Kremlin. Historian Mark Kramer concludes: "The net outflow of resources from eastern Europe to the Soviet Union was approximately $15 billion to $20 billion in the first decade after World War II, an amount roughly equal to the total aid provided by the United States to western Europe under the Marshall Plan.") Japan recovered much later. China returned to its pre-war industrial production by 1952.

== Impact ==
=== Casualties ===
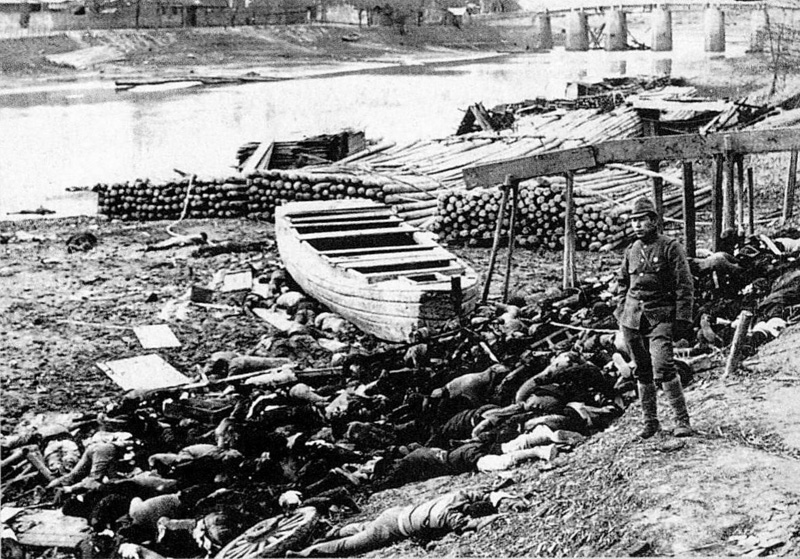
Bodies of Chinese civilians killed by the Imperial Japanese Army during the Nanjing Massacre in December 1937

An estimated 60 million to more than 75 million people died in the war including at least 20 million who died from deprivation, famine and disease. Civilian deaths have been estimated to comprise 67% to 80% of all direct and indirect deaths from the war. The Soviet Union had the highest overall death toll (estimated at 20 million to 28 million), followed by China (at least 15 million), Germany (6 million to 8.7 million) and Poland (5 million to 6.5 million).

The countries which sustained the most military deaths were the Soviet Union (about 8.7 million), Germany (around 5.3 million), China (2 million to 3 million) and Japan (1.7 million to 2.5 million). Of the 20 million to 25 million military deaths in the war, the majority were of German and Soviet soldiers, including prisoners of war (POWs), on the Eastern Front.

The high civilian death toll relative to military deaths was unusual for major wars up to that time. Some 10 million to 15 million people died of starvation and disease in China and the Soviet Union, and 8 million to 10 million in India and under Japanese occupation elsewhere in Asia and the Pacific. Around 15 million civilians died in genocides and other deliberate killings, while millions in total died in concentration camps, aerial bombings and in combat zones.

=== Genocide, war crimes, and crimes against humanity ===
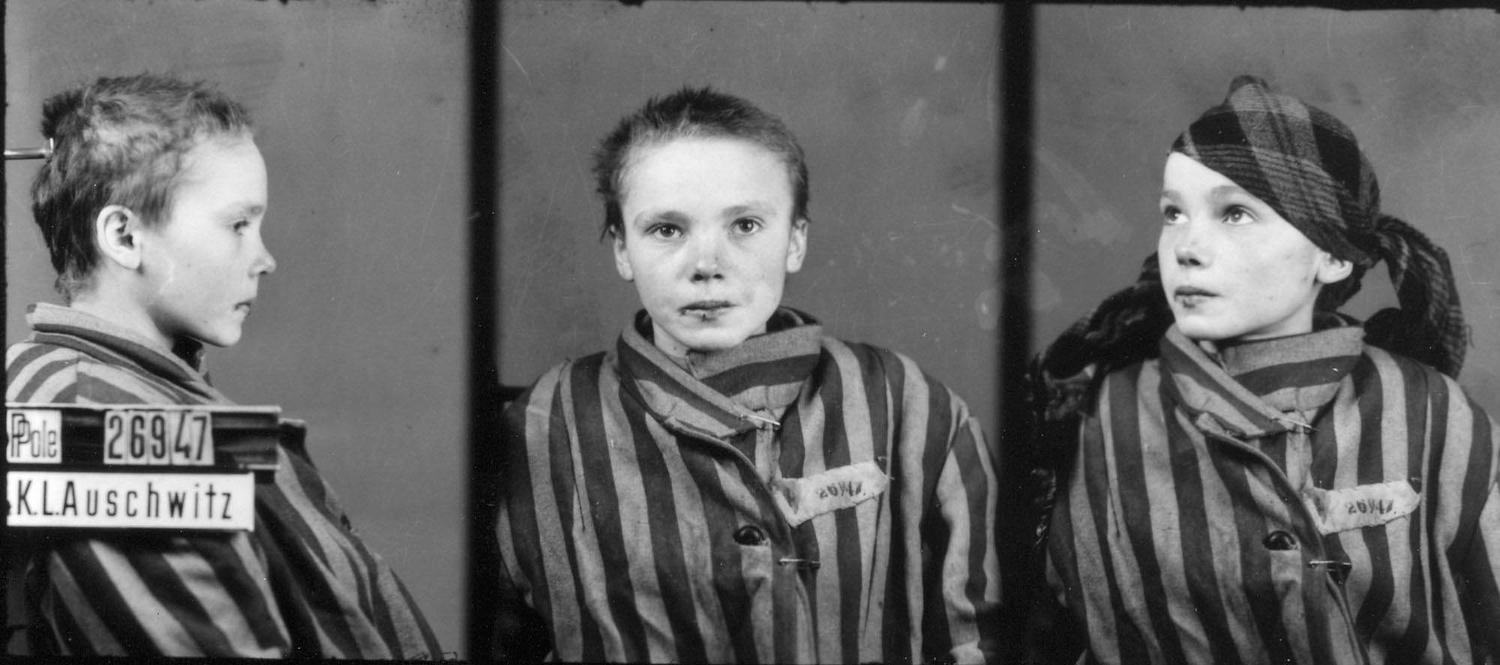
Prisoner identity photograph of a Polish girl taken by the German SS in Auschwitz. Approximately 230,000 children were held prisoner and used in forced labour and Nazi medical experiments.

In trials following the war, representatives of the Axis powers and their accomplices were convicted of numerous war crimes, crimes against humanity, and complicity in genocides. The Nazis killed about 6 million Jews in a racially motivated genocide known as the Holocaust. They also killed millions of Slavs, over 130,000 Romani, and members of other groups that they considered racially inferior. Almost 300,000 people with mental and physical disabilities were also systematically killed in Germany and its occupied territories.

The killing of civilians and POWs through massacres and deliberate starvation was especially common in the Eastern European and Asia-Pacific theatres. German forces on the Eastern Front destroyed or confiscated available food, massacred civilians in reprisals and routinely shot prisoners. The Japanese killed millions of civilians in occupied areas through massacres and scorched earth strategies; for example, in their "kill all, burn all, loot all" policy in China. In the Nanjing Massacre, between 40,000 and 200,000 Chinese civilians and POWs were killed. Japan also used biological weapons in China and in early conflicts against the Soviets. The Soviet Union was responsible for imprisoning, deporting and often executing hundreds of thousands of civilians and POWs from occupied or annexed territories. This included the Katyn massacre of 22,000 Polish officers and intellectuals.

War crimes were also committed in civil wars and conflicts between resistance groups in occupied territories. In Yugoslavia, numerous war crimes, including the massacre of civilians and prisoners, were committed by Axis forces and the Axis-aligned Croatian Ustaše. The main resistance groups, the Serbian-Nationalist Chetniks and the Communist-led partisans, also committed massacres and persecutions of their enemies. In Poland, about 100,000 Poles were killed by the Ukrainian Insurgent Army in the Volhynia massacres between 1943 and 1945. About 10,000 Ukrainians were killed by Poles in reprisal attacks. In Greece, Axis forces were mainly responsible for civilian deaths through deliberate starvation and reprisal massacres, although the major resistance forces, ELAS and EDES, also committed war crimes.

The Soviet Union, Japan and Germany inflicted high death rates on POWs through executions, starvation, forced labour and other mistreatment. The Soviet Union and Japan had not ratified the Geneva Convention on Prisoners of War, and Germany regarded itself as exempt from the convention on the Eastern Front. About a third of those taken prisoner by the Japanese died, as did almost 60 per cent of Soviet prisoners of the Germans. About a third of Germans taken prisoner by the Soviet Union died in captivity. The mortality rate of German and Japanese prisoners of the Western allies was 1 to 2 per cent.

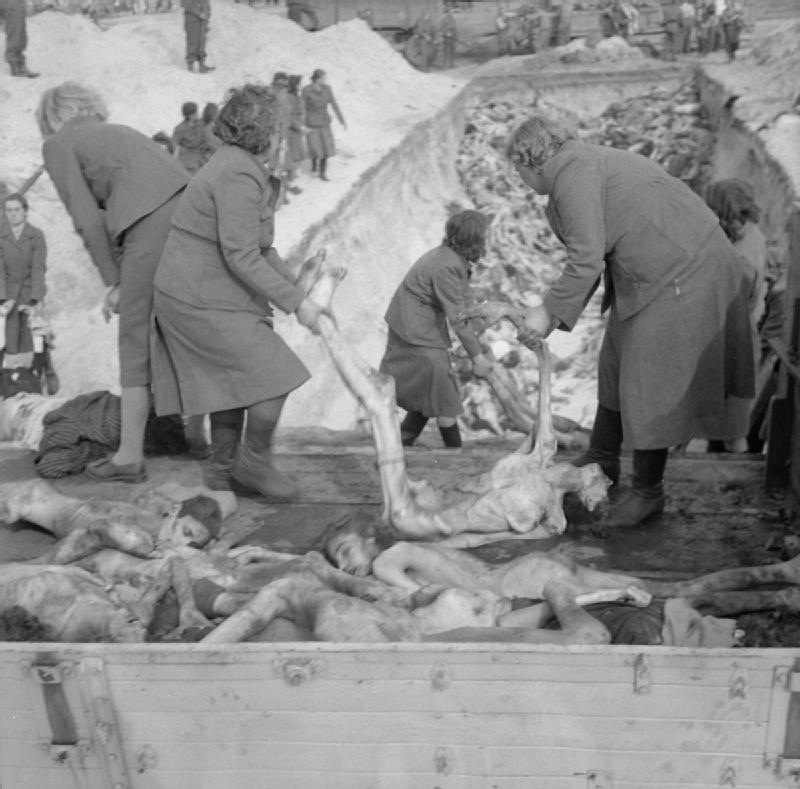
Schutzstaffel (SS) women camp guards removing prisoners' bodies from lorries and carrying them to a mass grave, inside the German Bergen-Belsen concentration camp, 1945

Germany, Japan and the Soviet Union made extensive use of forced labour of foreign civilians and POWs. In greater Germany, there were 7.6 million foreign workers (including POWs undertaking forced labour) and about 500,000 slave labourers in concentration camps by late 1944. Those civilians and POWs from Soviet-occupied territories who were deported to the Soviet Union were usually imprisoned in the Soviet forced labour camps, known as the gulag. Between 200,000 and one million Soviet POWs and civilians repatriated from German camps were also sent to the gulag as alleged Axis collaborators where many died from malnutrition, the harsh climate and overwork. The Japanese conscripted millions of foreign civilians and POWs to undertake forced labour in Japan and its occupied territories where they suffered harsh treatment and high death rates. Up to 200,000 Korean and Chinese women were forced into sex slavery.

While troops of all the major belligerents committed rapes, the rape of civilians was particularly widespread among the German, Japanese and Soviet military. The post-war international military tribunals found the evidence of rape by German forces "overwhelming". Twenty-nine Japanese defendants, mostly generals, were convicted of complicity in mass rape. Soviet soldiers also committed mass rapes in occupied territories, especially Germany.

War crimes were committed by the Western Allied powers, but not on the same scale as those of the Axis powers and the Soviet Union. The Western Allies prosecuted a number of war crimes committed by their own forces, but Allied war crimes were not prosecuted by the post-war international military tribunals. There has been continued debate over whether the area bombing of cities in Germany and Japan, and the atomic bombing of Hiroshima and Nagasaki, were war crimes.

=== Occupation ===
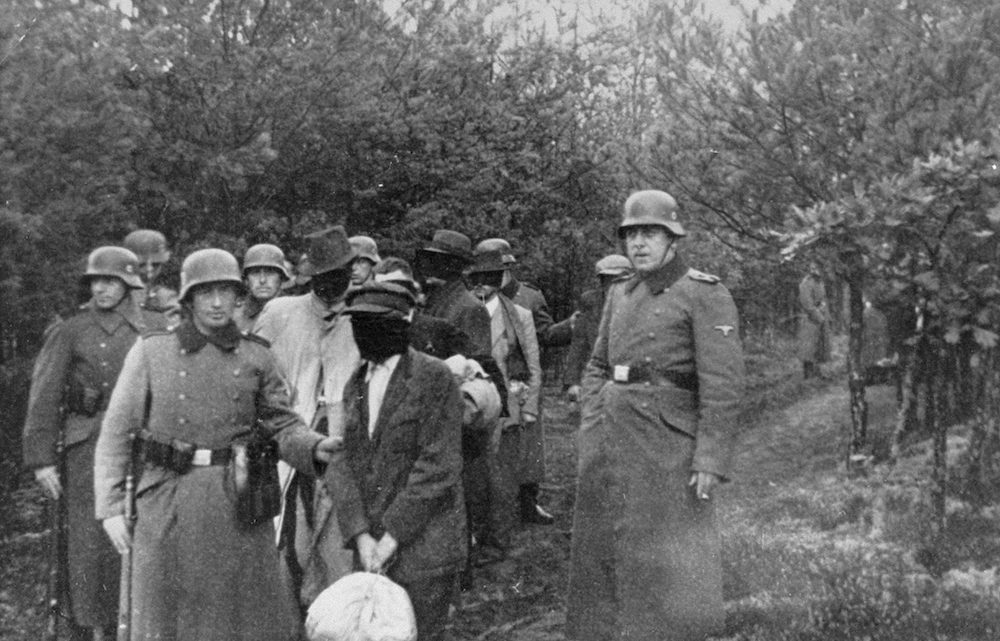
Polish civilians wearing blindfolds photographed just before being massacred by German soldiers in Palmiry forest, 1940

In Europe, occupation came in two forms. In Western, Northern, and Central Europe (France, Norway, Denmark, the Low Countries, and the annexed portions of Czechoslovakia) Germany established economic policies through which it collected roughly 69.5 billion reichsmarks (27.8 billion US dollars) by the end of the war; this figure does not include the plunder of industrial products, military equipment, raw materials and other goods. Thus, the income from occupied nations was over 40 per cent of the income Germany collected from taxation, a figure which increased to nearly 40 per cent of total German income as the war went on.

In the East, the intended gains of Lebensraum were never attained as fluctuating front-lines and Soviet scorched earth policies denied resources to the German invaders. Unlike in the West, the Nazi racial policy encouraged extreme brutality against what it considered to be the "inferior people" of Slavic descent; most German advances were thus followed by mass atrocities and war crimes. The Nazis killed an estimated 2.8 million ethnic Poles in addition to Polish-Jewish victims of the Holocaust. Although by 1942 resistance groups formed in most occupied territories, the assessments of the effectiveness of Soviet partisans and French Resistance suggests that they did not significantly hamper German operations until late 1943.

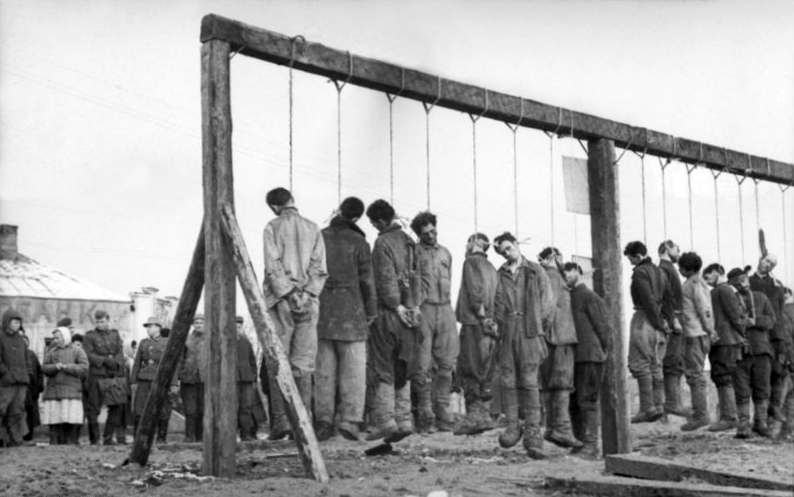
Soviet partisans hanged by the German army. The Russian Academy of Sciences reported in 1995 that civilian victims in the Soviet Union at German hands totalled 13.7 million dead, twenty per cent of the 68 million people in the occupied Soviet Union.

In Asia, Japan termed nations under its occupation as being part of the Greater East Asia Co-Prosperity Sphere, essentially a Japanese hegemony which it claimed was for purposes of liberating colonised peoples. Although Japanese forces were sometimes welcomed as liberators from European domination, Japanese war crimes frequently turned local public opinion against them. During Japan's initial conquest, it captured 4,000,000 barrels (640,000 m^{3}) of oil (~550,000 tonnes) left behind by retreating Allied forces; and by 1943, was able to get production in the Dutch East Indies up to 50 million barrels (7,900,000 m^{3}) of oil (~6.8 million tonnes), 76 per cent of its 1940 output rate.

=== Home fronts and production ===
Allies to Axis GDP ratio throughout the war

In the 1930s, Britain and the United States together controlled almost 75% of world mineral output—essential for projecting military power.

In Europe, before the outbreak of the war, the Allies had significant advantages in both population and economics. In 1938, the Western Allies (United Kingdom, France, Poland and the British Dominions) had a 30 per cent larger population and a 30 per cent higher gross domestic product than the European Axis powers (Germany and Italy); including colonies, the Allies had more than a 5:1 advantage in population and a nearly 2:1 advantage in GDP. In Asia at the same time, China had roughly six times the population of Japan but only an 89 per cent higher GDP; this reduces to three times the population and only a 38 per cent higher GDP if Japanese colonies are included.

The United States produced about two-thirds of all munitions used by the Allies in World War II, including warships, transports, warplanes, artillery, tanks, trucks, and ammunition. Although the Allies' economic and population advantages were largely mitigated during the initial rapid blitzkrieg attacks of Germany and Japan, they became the decisive factor by 1942, after the United States and Soviet Union joined the Allies and the war evolved into one of attrition. While the Allies' ability to out-produce the Axis was partly due to more access to natural resources, other factors, such as Germany and Japan's reluctance to employ women in the labour force, Allied strategic bombing, and Germany's late shift to a war economy contributed significantly. Additionally, neither Germany nor Japan planned to fight a protracted war, and had not equipped themselves to do so. Germany, Japan and the Soviet Union used millions of slave labourers in war-related industries.

=== Advances in technology and its application ===
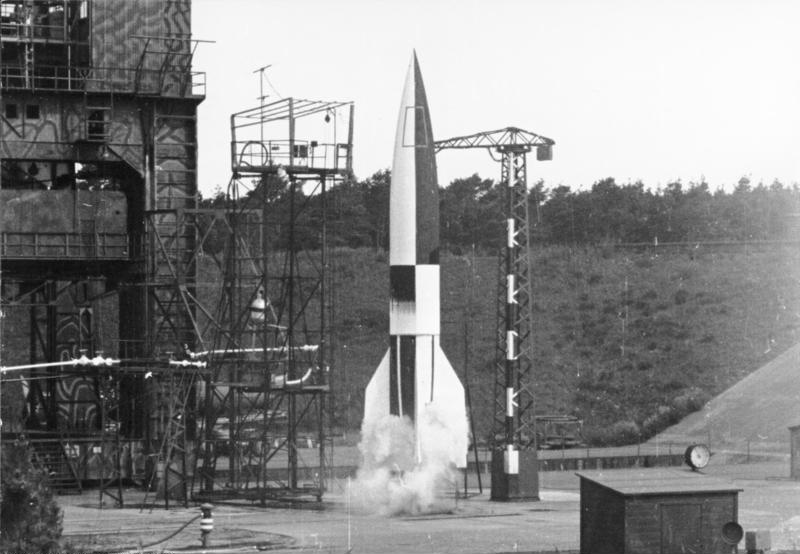
A V-2 rocket launched from a fixed site in Peenemünde, 21 June 1943

Aircraft were used for reconnaissance, as fighters, bombers, and ground-support, and each role developed considerably. Innovations included airlift (the capability to quickly move limited high-priority supplies, equipment, and personnel); and strategic bombing (the bombing of enemy industrial and population centres to destroy the enemy's ability to wage war). Anti-aircraft weaponry also advanced, including defences such as radar and surface-to-air artillery, in particular the introduction of the proximity fuze. The use of the jet aircraft was pioneered and led to jets becoming standard in air forces worldwide.

Advances were made in nearly every aspect of naval warfare, most notably with aircraft carriers and submarines. Although aeronautical warfare had relatively little success at the start of the war, actions at Taranto, Pearl Harbor, and the Coral Sea established the carrier as the dominant capital ship (in place of the battleship). In the Atlantic, escort carriers became a vital part of Allied convoys, increasing the effective protection radius and helping to close the Mid-Atlantic gap. Carriers were also more economical than battleships due to the relatively low cost of aircraft and because they are not required to be as heavily armoured. Submarines, which had proved to be an effective weapon during World War I, were expected by all combatants to be important in the second. The British focused development on anti-submarine weaponry and tactics, such as sonar and convoys, while Germany focused on improving its offensive capability, with designs such as the Type VII submarine and wolfpack tactics. Gradually, improving Allied technologies such as the Leigh Light, Hedgehog, Squid, and homing torpedoes proved effective against German submarines.

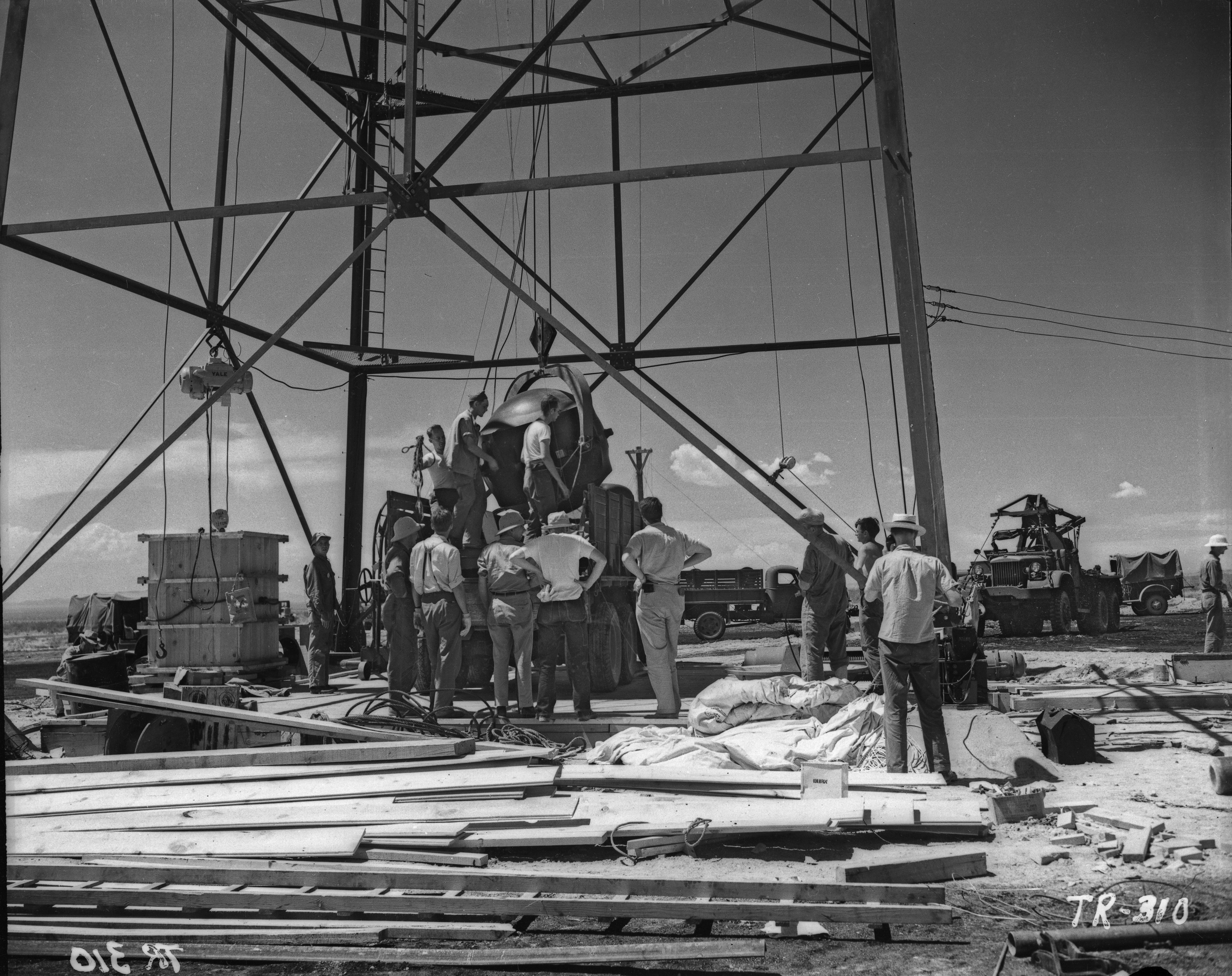
Nuclear Gadget being raised to the top of the detonation "shot tower", at Alamogordo Bombing Range; Trinity nuclear test, New Mexico, July 1945

Land warfare changed from the static frontlines of trench warfare of World War I, which had relied on improved artillery that outmatched the speed of both infantry and cavalry, to increased mobility and combined arms. The tank, which had been used predominantly for infantry support in the First World War, had evolved into the primary weapon. In the late 1930s, tank design had evolved considerably since World War I, and advances continued throughout the war with increases in speed, armour and firepower. At the start of the war, most commanders thought enemy tanks should be met by tanks with superior specifications. This idea was challenged by the poor performance of the relatively light early tank guns against armour, and German doctrine of avoiding tank-versus-tank combat. This, along with Germany's use of combined arms, were among the key elements of their highly successful blitzkrieg tactics across Poland and France. Many means of destroying tanks, including indirect artillery, anti-tank guns (both towed and self-propelled), mines, short-ranged infantry antitank weapons, and other tanks were used. Even with large-scale mechanisation, infantry remained the backbone of all forces, and throughout the war, most infantry were equipped similarly to World War I. The portable machine gun spread, a notable example being the German MG 34, and various submachine guns which were suited to close combat in urban and jungle settings. The assault rifle, a late war development incorporating many features of the rifle and submachine gun, became the standard post-war infantry weapon for most armed forces.

Most major belligerents attempted to solve the problems of complexity and security involved in using large codebooks for cryptography by designing ciphering machines, the most well-known being the German Enigma machine. Development of SIGINT (signals intelligence) and cryptanalysis enabled the countering process of decryption. Notable examples were the Allied decryption of Japanese naval codes and British Ultra, a pioneering method for decoding Enigma that benefited from information given to the United Kingdom by the Polish Cipher Bureau, which had been decoding early versions of Enigma before the war. Another component of military intelligence was deception, which the Allies used to great effect in operations such as Mincemeat and Bodyguard.

Other technological and engineering feats achieved during, or as a result of, the war include the world's first programmable computers (Z3, Colossus, and ENIAC), guided missiles and modern rockets, the Manhattan Project's development of nuclear weapons, operations research, the development of artificial harbours, and oil pipelines under the English Channel. Although penicillin was discovered before the war, the development of industrial production technology as well as the mass production and use began during the war.

== See also ==
- Lists of World War II topics
- World War III – Hypothetical future global conflict
