= Military capability =

Term for the ability for military action

Military capability is defined by the Australian Defence Force as "the ability to achieve a desired effect in a specific operating environment". It is defined by three interdependent factors: combat readiness, sustainable capability and force structure.

In terms of technologies, weapons and equipment use, it represents assets, that exist to perform specific functions in relation to requirements of the statement about present or future military operations as derived from the national defence policy (strategic). A national Capabilities Development Plan seeks to provide a global understanding of capability needs, capability trends and potential capability shortfalls.

Military capability is often referred to in terms of low, medium and high, although this usually refers to the type, quantity and sophistication of technology being used in combat operations, and the severity of threat to security of the state.

Maintaining military capability requires modernisation of military technology, particularly prevalent in Europe since the Middle Ages due to the arms race that commenced with the introduction of artillery and later firearms into warfare.

In the European Union, capability development is approached by the Capability Directorate focusing on three primary areas:

- IAP: Information Acquisition & Processing – Knowledge
- GEM: Guidance, Energy & Materials – Engagement
- ESM: Environment, Systems & Modelling – Manoeuver

Existing military capability in armed forces will be employed, and only minor enhancements are possible in a short conflict. The context within which the military capabilities are used such as the geography of the area of operations, the culture and demography of the enemy, and the preparedness of the opposing forces, generally can not be altered at the start of the conflict.

It is a major part of military science to find methods of defeating the enemy with available capabilities using existing and new concepts. Successful use of military capability by employing these concepts and methods is reflected in the effects on the enemy ability to continue to resist, subject to Rules of Engagement (ROE) range of political, legal and ethical factors. Military capability is often tested in peacetime by using the scenario methodology to analyse performance, often as a war game. It is:

The military's strategic role is to advise civilian leadership on the capability of military forces to execute specific missions.

Future military capability is developed based on the analysis of experimentation and testing of existing capability performance, and future capability decisions are made based on the armed forces being able to meet the challenges of a range of possible future scenarios. This is arguably a difficult task to accomplish due to the lack of predictability about future threats, changes in defence policy, and the range of response options and their effects that a government may want as a matter of future national defence policy.

The difference between expected and deliverable military capabilities is called the military capability gap, although the same term is also sometimes used to compare capabilities of potential future belligerents.

The vast majority of international relations studies and defense analyses assume that military power is a direct product of material resources, often measured in terms of the size of a state's defense budget, military forces, or gross domestic product (GDP). A growing body of research, however, claims that certain non-material factors significantly affect the ability of states to translate their resources into fighting power.

== See also ==
- Military budget
- Military
