= Australian Defence Force =

National military force of Australia

- The Australian Defence Force Ensign
- Founded: 1 March 1901 (as the Australian Army and Commonwealth Naval Forces)
- Current form: 9 February 1976 (as the unified Australian Defence Force)
- Service branches: Royal Australian Navy; Australian Army; Royal Australian Air Force
- Headquarters: Russell Offices and Campbell Park, Canberra, ACT

Leadership
- Prime Minister: Anthony Albanese
- Minister for Defence: Richard Marles
- Chief of the Defence Force: Admiral Mark Hammond

Personnel
- Military age: 16.5 years (for selection); 17 years (to serve); 18 years (to deploy); 19 years (for special forces deployment)
- Conscription: Wartime only
- Active personnel: 58,909 (30 June 2025)
- Reserve personnel: 33,269 (30 June 2025)

Expenditure
- Budget: A$55.7 billion (2024–25) (~US$36.8 billion) (ranked 13th)
- Percent of GDP: 2.02% (2024/25)

Industry
- Domestic suppliers: Defence industry of Australia
- Annual exports: Around A$2 billion (2018)

Related articles
- History: Military history of Australia
- Ranks: Australian Defence Force ranks and insignia

The Australian Defence Force (ADF) is the military organisation responsible for the defence of Australia and its national interests. It consists of three services: the Royal Australian Navy (RAN), the Australian Army and the Royal Australian Air Force (RAAF). The ADF has a strength of just over 90,000 personnel and is supported by the Department of Defence and other civilian entities that altogether constitute the Australian Defence Organisation.

During the first decades of the 20th century, the Australian Government established the armed services as separate organisations, with each service having an independent chain of command. In 1976, the government made a strategic change and established the ADF to place the services under a single headquarters. Over time, the degree of integration has increased, and tri-service headquarters, logistics, and training institutions have supplanted many single-service establishments. The ADF has been deployed around the world in combat, peacekeeping and disaster-relief missions.

The ADF is technologically sophisticated but relatively small for its landmass. The ADF has 58,909 full-time active-duty personnel and 33,269 active reservists. The ADF has the largest military in Oceania, although it is smaller than most Asian military forces. The ADF is supported by a significant budget by worldwide standards and is well equipped and trained, with defence spending at 2.02% of GDP.

== History ==
=== Formation ===
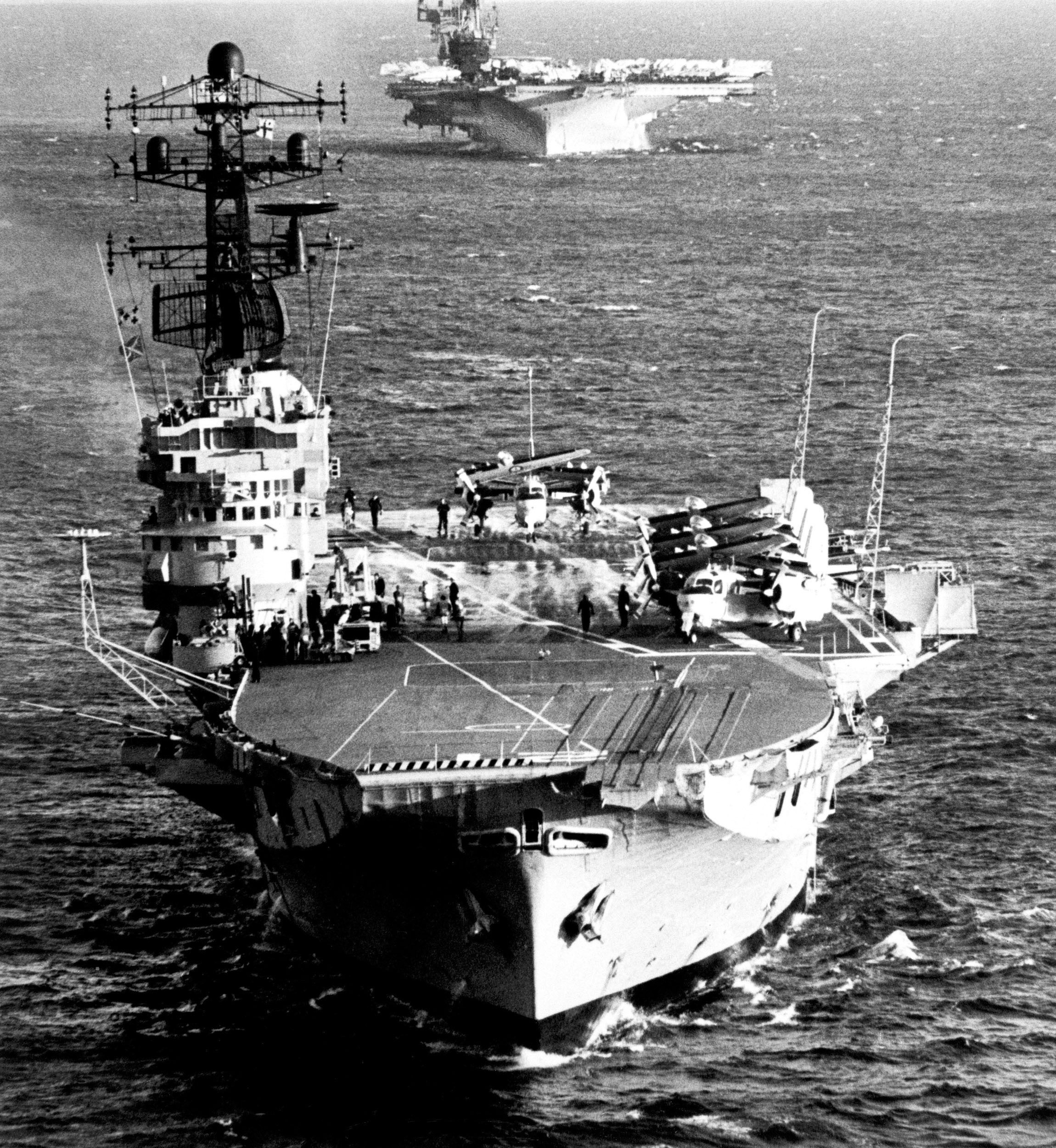
The retirement of the aircraft carrier HMAS Melbourne without replacement in 1982 marked a shift away from the policy of "forward defence".

By 1870, each of the then Australian colonies maintained their own military forces. On 1 January 1901, the colonies federated into a new nation and on 1 March 1901, these colonial forces were amalgamated to establish the Australian Army and Commonwealth Naval Forces. In 1911, the government established the Royal Australian Navy, which absorbed the Commonwealth Naval Force. The Army established the Australian Flying Corps in 1912 which was separated to form the Royal Australian Air Force in 1921. The services were not linked by a single chain of command, as they each reported to their own separate Minister and had separate administrative arrangements. The three services saw action around the world during World War I and World War II, and took part in conflicts in Asia during the Cold War.

The importance of joint warfare was made clear to the Australian military during World War II when Australian naval, ground and air units frequently served as part of single commands. Following the war, several senior officers lobbied for the appointment of a commander-in-chief of the three services. The government rejected this proposal and the three services remained fully independent. The absence of a central authority resulted in poor coordination between the services, with each service organising and operating under different military doctrine.

The need for an integrated command structure received more emphasis due to inefficient arrangements during the Vietnam War which at times hindered the military's efforts. In 1973, the Secretary of the Department of Defence, Arthur Tange, submitted a report to the Government that recommended the unification of the separate departments supporting each service under a single Department of Defence, and the creation of the position of Chief of the Defence Force Staff. The government accepted these recommendations, and the Australian Defence Force was established on 9 February 1976.

=== Defence of Australia era ===
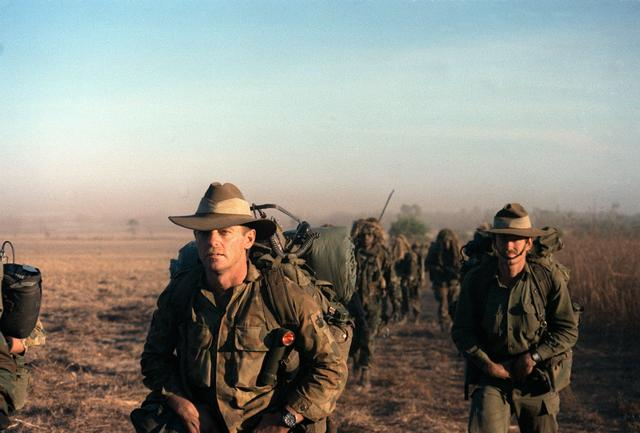
Australian soldiers lead a column of American troops during Exercise Kangaroo '89, which was held in northern Australia.

Until the 1970s, Australia's military strategy centred on the concept of "forward defence", in which the role of the Australian military was to co-operate with allied forces to counter threats in Australia's region. In 1969, when the United States began the Guam Doctrine and the British withdrew east of Suez, Australia developed a defence policy which emphasised self-reliance and the defence of continental Australia. This was known as the Defence of Australia Policy. Under this policy, the focus of Australian defence planning was to protect Australia's northern maritime approaches (the Air-Sea Gap) against enemy attack. In line with this goal, the ADF was restructured to increase its ability to strike at enemy forces from Australian bases and to counter raids on continental Australia. The ADF achieved this by increasing the capabilities of the RAN and RAAF and relocating regular Army units to northern Australia.

At this time, the ADF had no military units on operational deployment outside Australia. In 1987, the ADF made its first operational deployment as part of Operation Morris Dance, in which several warships and a rifle company deployed to the waters off Fiji in response to the 1987 Fijian coups d'état. While broadly successful, this deployment highlighted the need for the ADF to improve its capability to rapidly respond to unforeseen events.

Since the late 1980s, the Government has increasingly called upon the ADF to contribute forces to peacekeeping missions around the world. While most of these deployments involved only small numbers of specialists, several led to the deployment of hundreds of personnel. Large peacekeeping deployments were made to Namibia in early 1989, Cambodia between 1992 and 1993, Somalia in 1993, Rwanda between 1994 and 1995 and Bougainville in 1994 and from 1997 onwards.

The Australian contribution to the 1991 Gulf War was the first time Australian personnel were deployed to an active war zone since the establishment of the ADF. Although the warships and clearance diving team deployed to the Persian Gulf did not see combat, the deployment tested the ADF's capabilities and command structure. Following the war the Navy regularly deployed a frigate to the Persian Gulf or Red Sea to enforce the trade sanctions imposed on Iraq.

=== East Timor deployment ===
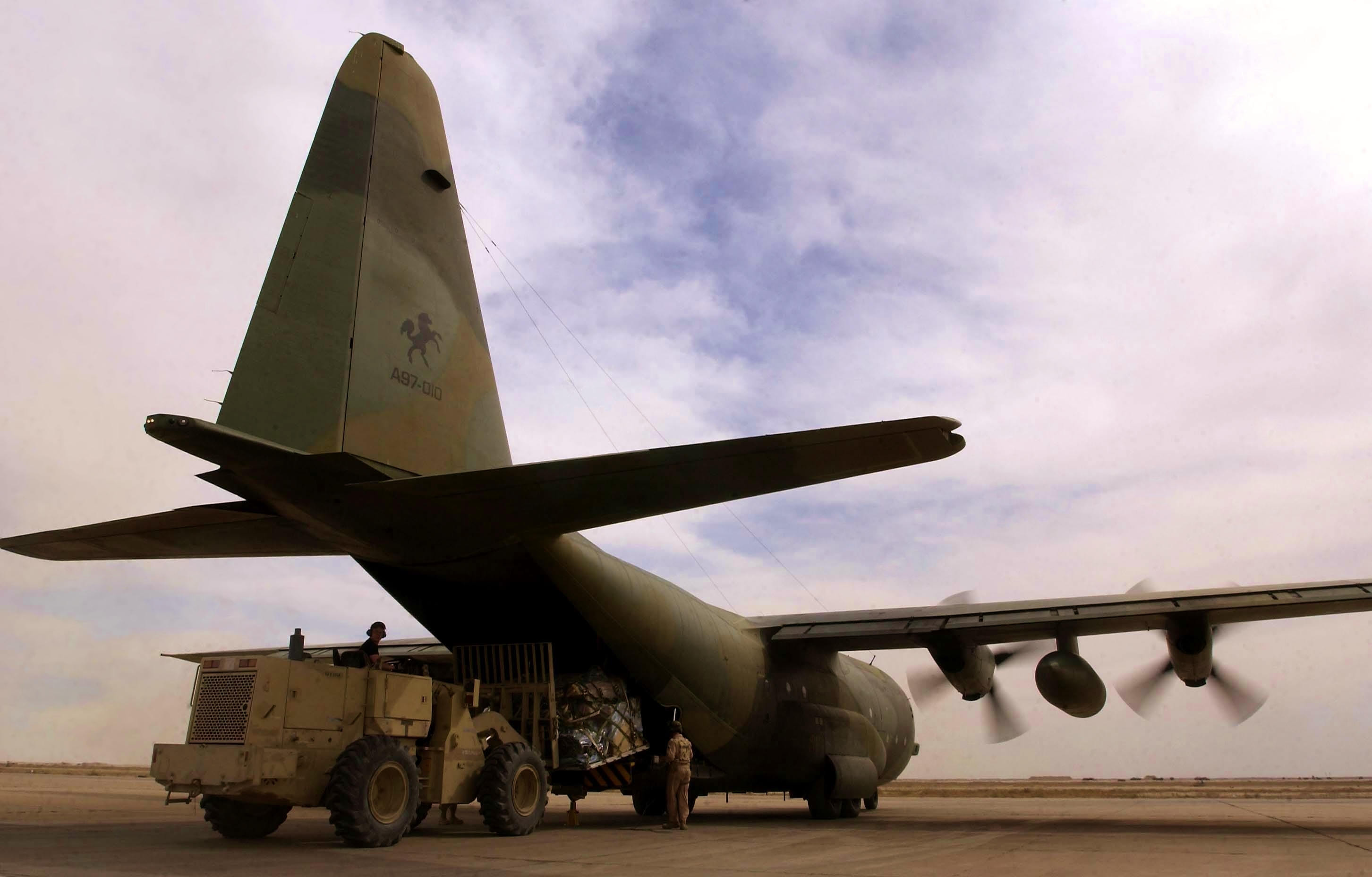
A RAAF C-130 Hercules being unloaded at Tallil Air Base, Iraq, during April 2003

In 1996, John Howard led the Liberal Party's election campaign and became prime minister. Subsequently, there were significant reforms to the ADF's force structure and role. The new government's defence strategy placed less emphasis on defending Australia from direct attack and greater emphasis on working in co-operation with regional states and Australia's allies to manage potential security threats. From 1997 the Government also implemented a series of changes to the ADF's force structure to increase the proportion of combat units to support units and improve the ADF's combat effectiveness.

The ADF's experiences during the deployment to East Timor in 1999 led to significant changes in Australia's defence policies and, an enhancement of the ADF's ability to conduct operations outside Australia. This successful deployment was the first time a large ADF force had operated outside of Australia since the Vietnam War and revealed shortcomings in its ability to mount and sustain such operations.

In 2000, the Government released a new Defence White Paper, Defence 2000 – Our Future Defence Force, that placed a greater emphasis on preparing the ADF for overseas deployments. The Government committed to improve the ADF's capabilities by improving the readiness and equipment of ADF units, expanding the ADF and increasing real Defence expenditure by 3% per year; in the event, expenditure increased by 2.3% per annum in real terms in the period to 2012–13. In 2003 and 2005, the Defence Updates emphasised this focus on expeditionary operations and led to an expansion and modernisation of the ADF.

=== Iraq and Afghanistan ===
Since 2000, the ADF's expanded force structure and deployment capabilities have been put to the test on several occasions. Following the 11 September 2001 terrorist attacks on the United States, Australia committed a special forces task group and an air-to-air refuelling aircraft to operations in Afghanistan, and naval warships to the Persian Gulf as Operation Slipper. In 2003, approximately 2,000 ADF personnel, including a special forces task group, three warships and 14 F/A-18 Hornet aircraft, took part in the invasion of Iraq.

The ADF was subsequently involved in the reconstruction of Iraq. From 2003 until 2005 this was mainly limited to a Security Detachment which protected the Australian embassy, the attachment of officers to multi-national headquarters, small numbers of transport and maritime patrol aircraft, and teams of air traffic controllers and medical personnel. From 2005 until 2008 a battalion-sized Australian Army battle group (initially designated the Al Muthanna Task Group, and later Overwatch Battle Group (West)) was stationed in southern Iraq. In addition, teams of ADF personnel were deployed to train Iraqi military units. In line with a 2007 election commitment, the Rudd government withdrew combat-related forces from Iraq in mid-2008, and most of the remaining Australian units left the country the next year.

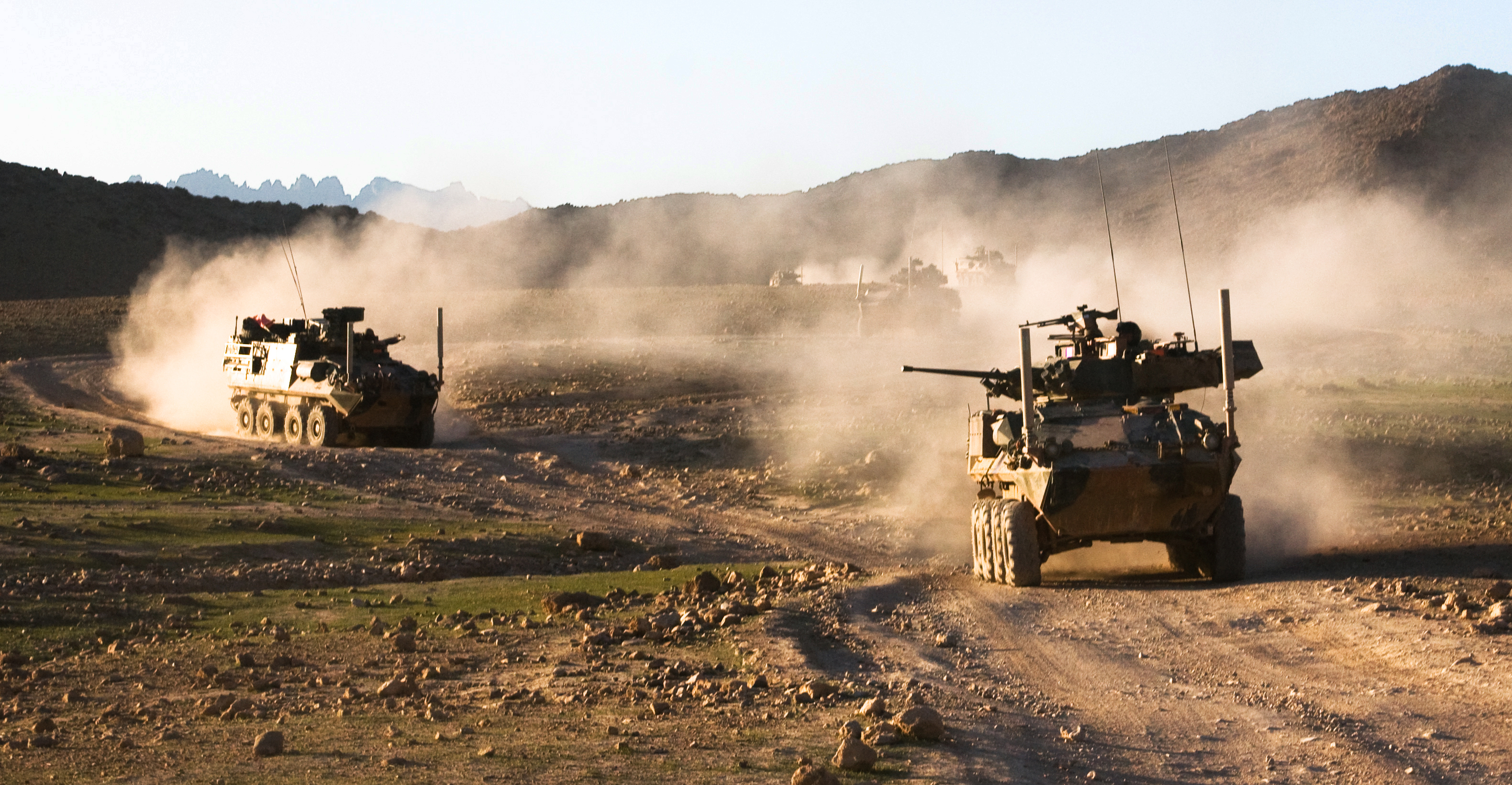
Australian Army ASLAV armoured vehicles in Afghanistan during 2011

The ADF also undertook several operations in Australia's immediate region during the 2000s. In 2003, elements of all three services were dispatched to Solomon Islands as part of the Regional Assistance Mission to the Solomon Islands. Regular deployments of Australian forces continued to the islands until 2017. Between December 2004 and March 2005, 1,400 ADF personnel served in Indonesia as part of Operation Sumatra Assist, which formed part of Australia's response to the devastating 2004 Indian Ocean earthquake. In May 2006, approximately 2,000 ADF personnel deployed to East Timor in Operation Astute following unrest between elements of the Timor Leste Defence Force. This deployment concluded in March 2013.

From 2006 until 2013 a battalion-sized Australian Army task force operated in Urozgan Province, Afghanistan; this unit was primarily tasked with providing assistance for reconstruction efforts and training Afghan forces, but was frequently involved in combat. In addition, Special Forces Task Groups were deployed from 2005 to 2006 and 2007 until 2013. Other specialist elements of the ADF, including detachments of CH-47 Chinook helicopters and RAAF radar and air traffic control units, were also periodically deployed to the country. A total of 40 ADF personnel were killed in Afghanistan between 2002 and 2013, and 262 wounded. Following the withdrawal of the combat forces in 2013, ADF training teams have continued to be stationed in the country to train Afghan forces.

The Australian Labor Party (ALP) governments led by prime ministers Kevin Rudd and Julia Gillard between 2007 and 2013 commissioned two defence white papers, which were published in 2009 and 2013. The 2009 document, Defending Australia in the Asia Pacific Century: Force 2030, had a focus on responding to China's rapidly growing influence. It included commitments to expand the RAN, including acquiring twelve submarines, and increasing defence spending by three percent per year in real terms. This increase in spending did not occur, however. The Defence White Paper 2013 had similar strategic themes, but set out a more modest program of defence spending which reflected the government's constrained finances. As part of an election commitment, the Liberal–National Coalition Abbott government commissioned a further defence white paper that was published in 2016. This document also included a commitment to expand the ADF's size and capabilities. There has generally been bipartisan agreement between the ALP and the Liberal–National Coalition on the ADF's role since the mid-1970s. Both political groupings currently support the ADF's focus on expeditionary operations, and the broad funding target set out in the 2016 Defence White Paper. The ADF's broad force structure has also experienced little change since the 1980s. For instance, throughout this period the Army's main combat formations have been three brigades and the RAAF has been equipped with around 100 combat aircraft. Most of the equipment used by the services has been replaced or upgraded, however.

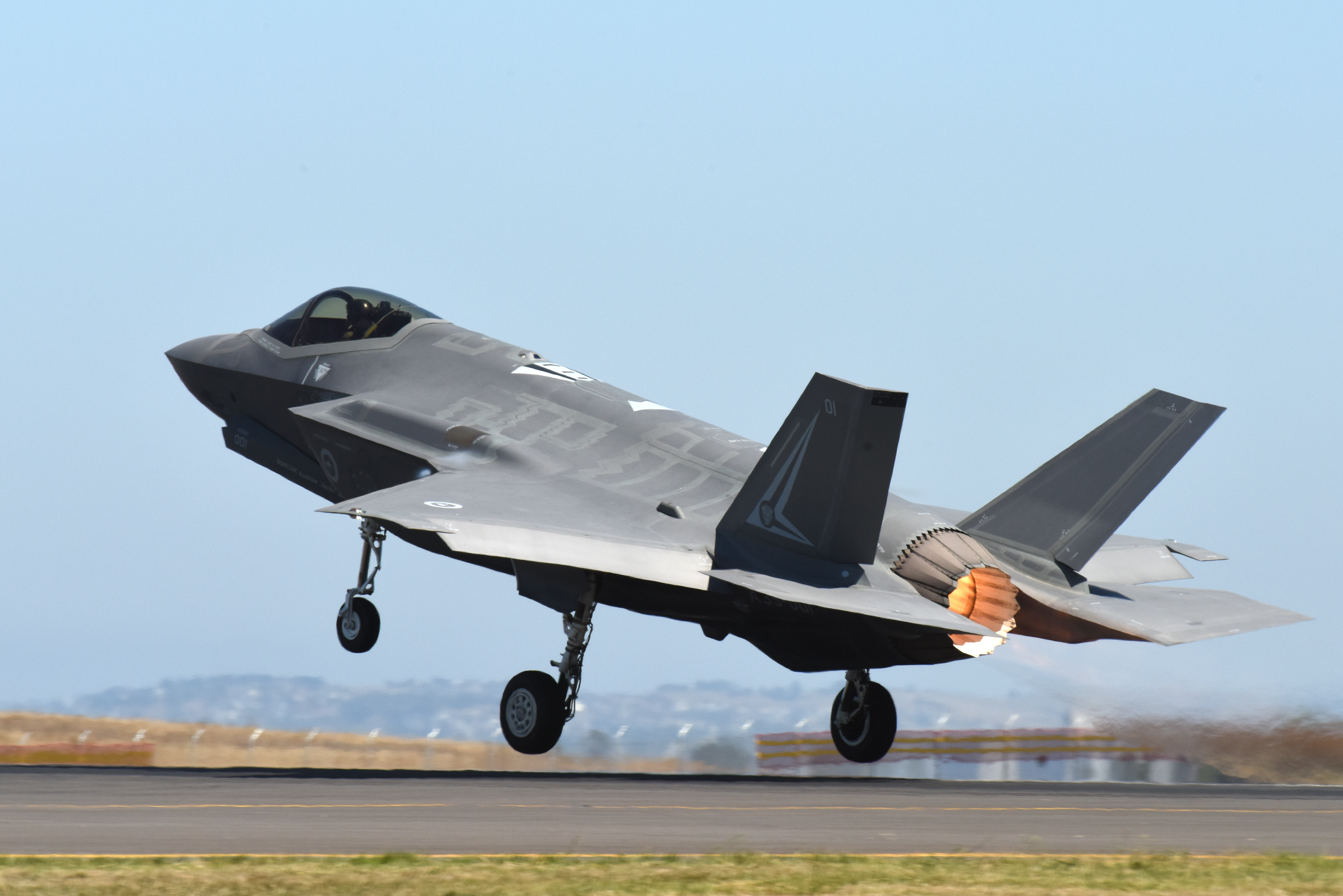
The Australian Government intends to buy at least 72 F-35A Lightning II aircraft to re-equip the RAAF's air combat force

It is stated in the 2016 Defence White Paper that Australia's changing security environment will lead to new demands being placed on the Australian Defence Force. Although it is not expected that Australia will face any threat of direct attack from another country, terrorist groups and tensions between nations in East Asia pose threats to Australian security. More broadly, the Australian Government believes that it needs to make a contribution to maintaining the rules-based order globally. There is also a risk that climate change, weak economic growth and social factors could cause instability in South Pacific countries.

The ADF has developed strategies to respond to Australia's changing strategic environment. The 2016 Defence White Paper states that "the Government will ensure Australia maintains a regionally superior ADF with the highest levels of military capability and scientific and technological sophistication". To this end, the government intends to improve the ADF's combat power and expand the number of military personnel. This will include introducing new technologies and capabilities. The ADF is also seeking to improve its intelligence capabilities and co-operation between the services.

Beginning in August 2014, RAAF combat forces, an Army special forces task force and an Army training unit were deployed to the Middle East during Operation Okra as part of the international war against the Islamic State. The RAAF aircraft conducted air strikes in Iraq and Syria and provided airborne command and control and air-to-air refuelling for the coalition forces. The special forces advised the Iraqi Army and the training unit trained Iraqi soldiers. The RAAF combat aircraft completed operations in January 2018, and the other aircraft were withdrawn in September 2020. The Army training force departed in mid-2020.

=== 2020–present ===
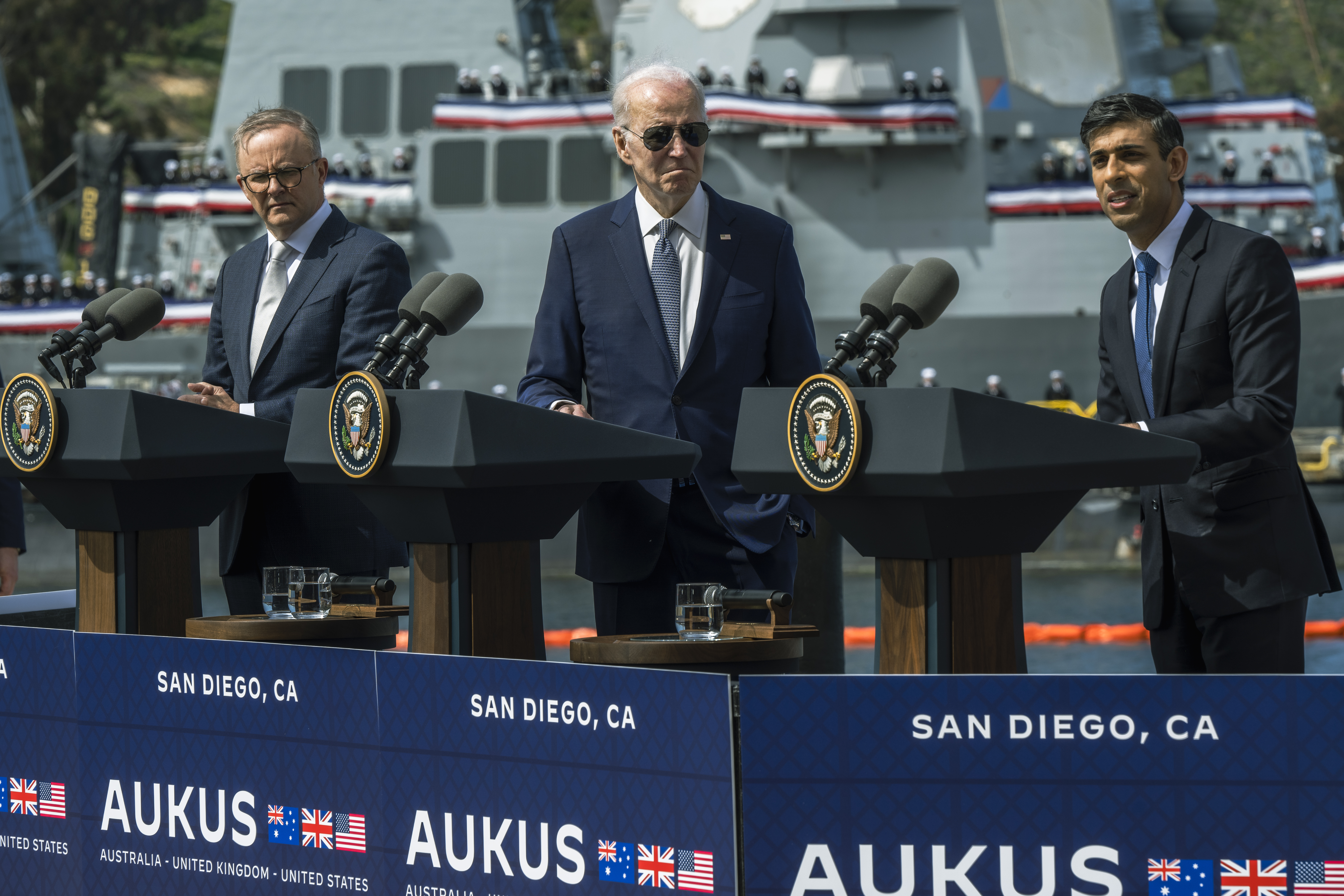
Australian Prime Minister Anthony Albanese, US President Joe Biden and British Prime Minister Rishi Sunak during a meeting held in March 2023 to announce the details of Australia's plans to acquire nuclear attack submarines as part of the AUKUS partnership

The Australian Government believes that the country's strategic circumstances are worsening due to the threat posed by China. This has led to decisions to expand the ADF and enhance its ability to participate in high intensity combat. The 2020 Defence Strategic Update called for the ADF's efforts to be focused on the Indo-Pacific region. It also concluded that there was no longer a ten-year period of strategic warning before Australia could be involved in a major war. The document stated that the ADF's funding would be expanded, and its capacity to strike at targets from a long distance be improved. In September 2021, Australia entered into the AUKUS trilateral security partnership with the United Kingdom and United States. As part of this partnership, Australia will obtain nuclear attack submarines to significantly improve the RAN's capabilities - this replaced a plan to acquire 12 conventionally powered Attack-class submarines in partnership with France. The three AUKUS countries also agreed to collaborate on a range of military technologies.

An investigation of allegations of Australian war crimes in Afghanistan was completed in November 2020. The Brereton Report found that there was evidence that 25 Australian special forces personnel committed war crimes on 25 occasions, resulting in the deaths of 39 people and the mistreatment of two others. General Angus Campbell accepted all of the 143 recommendations made in the report. The government announced the implementation of 139 of the recommendations in 2024, with the remaining relating to ongoing criminal investigations by the newly created Office of the Special Investigator. The office charged a first soldier with war crimes in March 2023.

During August 2021, RAAF aircraft participated in an international airlift to evacuate people from Kabul in Afghanistan after it fell to the Taliban. An Army infantry company was deployed to Kabul as part of this operation. More than 3,500 people were evacuated by the RAAF. Following the Russian invasion of Ukraine in February 2022 Australia provided military assistance to Ukraine. As of April 2023, this included the transfer of military equipment from the ADF worth $A475 million and the deployment of an Army training team to the United Kingdom to train Ukrainian soldiers.

The election of the ALP Albanese government in May 2022 did not significantly change Australia's defence posture, as the ALP and Coalition parties have broadly similar defence policies. This includes an agreement on China posing a threat to Australia's security. The main difference is that the ALP sees climate change as an important security issue. After coming to power, the Albanese government commissioned the Defence Strategic Review that was publicly released in April 2023. The review found that the security challenges facing Australia had continued to worsen, and called for the ADF to be restructured to meet the threats. This includes transitioning the ADF from its traditional structure of a "balanced force" capable of a range of activities to a "focused force" tailored mainly to protecting Australia from military attack or coercion. As part of this change, the review recommended reducing the planned size of the Army's mechanised forces and expanding its long-range firepower. The review also identified climate change as a threat to Australia and called for a "whole of nation effort" to defending Australia that goes beyond the ADF. The government accepted most of the review's recommendations.

== Structure ==
The Australian Defence Force and Department of Defence make up the Australian Defence Organisation (ADO), which is often referred to as "Defence". A diarchy of the Chief of the Defence Force (CDF) and the Secretary of the Department of Defence administers the ADO. The Department of Defence is staffed by both civilian and military personnel, and includes agencies such as the Defence Intelligence Organisation (DIO) and Defence Science and Technology Group (DST Group).

=== Command arrangements ===
The ADF's command arrangements are set out in the Defence Act 1903 and subordinate legislation. The act refers to the constitution, which vests the governor-general with the command-in-chief of the Defence Force. This power is only exercised on the advice of government ministers. The act also states that the Minister for Defence "has general control and administration of the Defence Force" and that the CDF and the Secretary of the Department of Defence must "comply with any directions of the Minister". The leaders of the ADO are also responsible to the junior ministers who are appointed to manage specific elements of the defence portfolio. Under the Albanese Ministry two cabinet-level ministers have been responsible for the Defence portfolio since May 2022: the position of Minister for Defence held by the Deputy Prime Minister Richard Marles, and Matt Keogh is the Minister for Defence Personnel and the Minister for Veterans' Affairs. In addition, there are two junior ministers: Matt Thistlethwaite is the Assistant Minister for Defence and Assistant Minister for Veterans' Affairs and Pat Conroy is the Minister for Defence Industry.

The CDF is the most senior appointment in the ADF and commands the force. The CDF is the only four-star officer in the ADF and is a general, admiral or air chief marshal. As well as having command responsibilities, the CDF is the Minister for Defence's principal military adviser. Admiral Mark Hammond is the current CDF, and assumed this position on 9 July 2026. In 2006 Hugh White, a prominent academic and former Deputy Secretary in the Department of Defence, criticised the existing and prior Defence ministers for not providing the CDF and Secretary of Defence with enough authority to manage the ADF, with the minister playing too large a role in managing the organisation. Conversely, in 2024 associate professor James Connor found that Defence ministers have been too reliant on advice from the Defence department, partially due to fast turnover of defence ministers.

Under the current ADF command structure the day-to-day management of the ADF is distinct from the command of military operations. The services are administered through the ADO, with the head of each service (the Chief of Navy, Chief of Army and Chief of Air Force) and the service headquarters being responsible for raising, training and sustaining combat forces. Each chief is also the CDF's principal adviser on matters concerning the responsibilities of their service. The CDF chairs the Chiefs of Service Committee which comprises the service chiefs, Vice Chief of the Defence Force and the Chief of Joint Operations (CJOPS). The CDF and service chiefs are supported by an integrated ADF Headquarters, which replaced separate service headquarters on 1 July 2017.

While the individual members of each service ultimately report to their service's Chief, the Chiefs do not control military operations. Control of ADF operations is exercised through a formal command chain headed by the CJOPS, who reports directly to the CDF. The CJOPS commands the Headquarters Joint Operations Command (HQJOC) as well as temporary joint task forces. These joint task forces comprise units assigned from their service to participate in operations or training exercises.

=== Joint forces ===
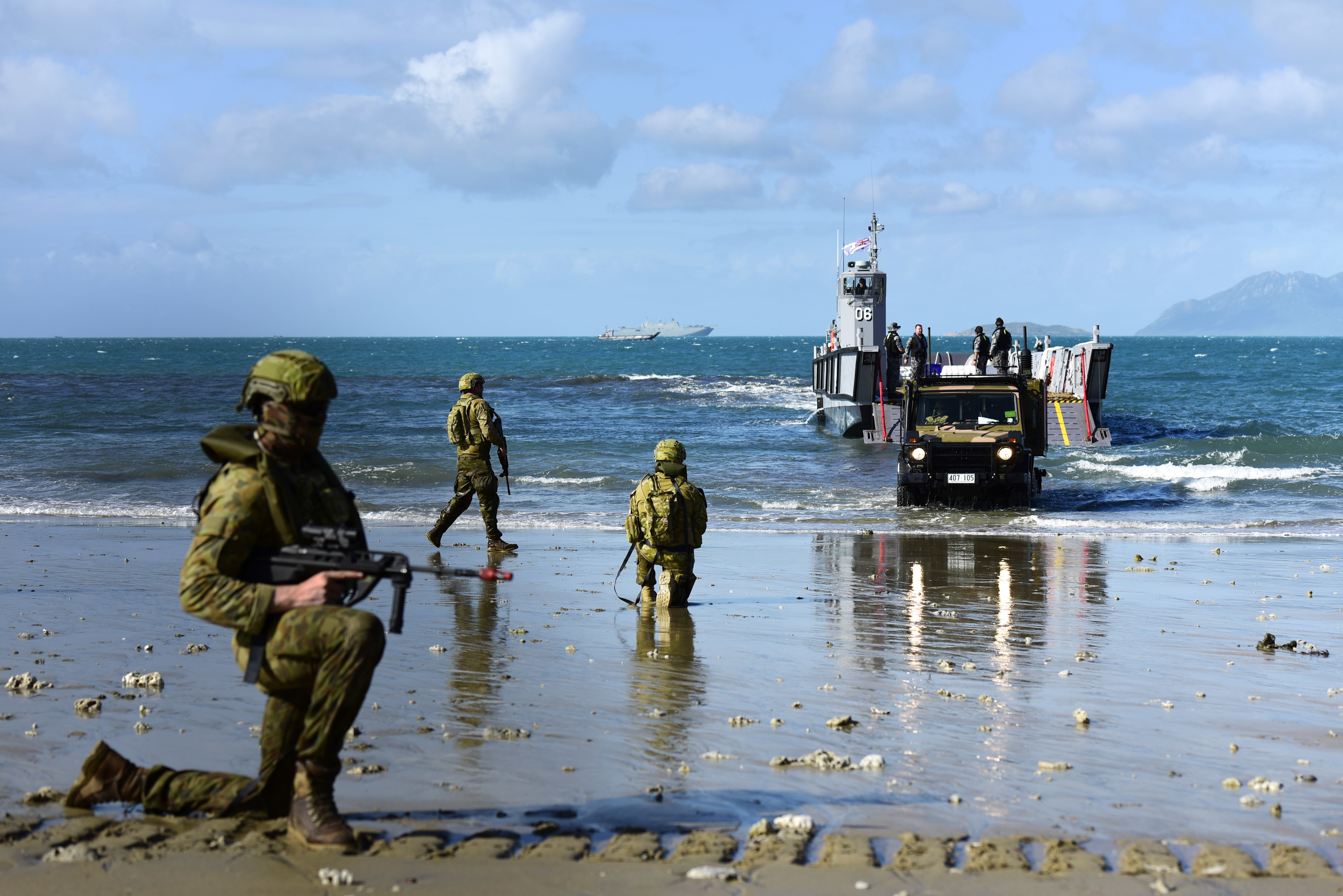
Australian Army soldiers providing security for a RAN LHD Landing Craft during a joint exercise in 2018

Operational command of the ADF is exercised by HQJOC, which is located at a purpose-built facility near Bungendore, New South Wales. This is a joint headquarters comprising personnel from the three services and includes a continuously manned Joint Control Centre. HQJOC's main role is to "plan, monitor and control" ADF operations and exercises, and it is organised around groups of plans, operations and support staff. HQJOC also monitors the readiness of the ADF units which are not assigned to operations and contributes to developing Australia's military doctrine.

As well as HQJOC, the ADF has permanent joint operational commands responsible to the CJOPS. Joint Operations Command (JOC) includes the two headquarters responsible for patrolling Australia's maritime borders on a day-to-day basis, Northern Command and Maritime Border Command. Other JOC units include the Joint Movements Group and the Air and Space Operations Centre. Individual ADF units and Joint Task Groups are assigned to JOC during operations, and HQJOC includes officers responsible for submarine and special operations forces.

The Joint Capabilities Group manages the ADF's space, cyber, information operations, logistics and joint training functions. It also includes an element that undertakes planning for mobilising Australia's economy. It was established in 2017, and the group now has several elements that integrate units previously assigned to individual services, including Cyber Command and Space Command.

The ADF includes a number of joint operational and training units. These include the Joint Military Police Unit and the Joint Helicopter Aircrew Training School.

=== Royal Australian Navy ===
The Royal Australian Navy is the naval branch of the Australian Defence Force. The RAN operates just under 50 commissioned warships, including destroyers, frigates, submarines, patrol boats and auxiliary ships, as well as a number of non-commissioned vessels. In addition, the RAN maintains a force of combat, logistics and training helicopters.

There are two parts to the RAN's structure. One is an operational command, Fleet Command, and the other is a support command, Navy Strategic Command. The Navy's assets are administered by five "forces" which report to the Commander Australian Fleet. These are the Fleet Air Arm, the Mine Warfare, Clearance Diving, Hydrographic, Meteorological and Patrol Force, Shore Force, Submarine Force and Surface Force.

=== Australian Army ===
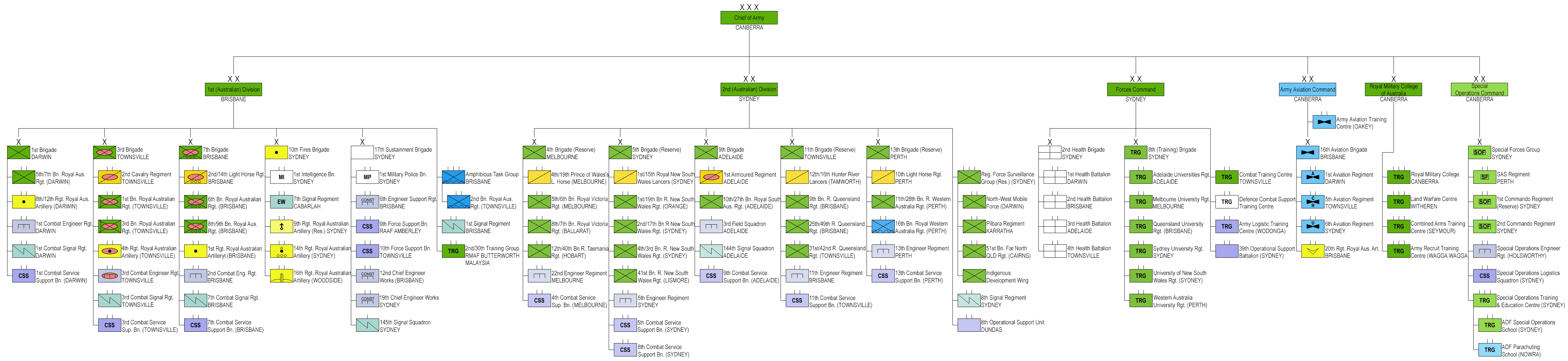
Australian Army organisation 2025 (click to enlarge)

The Army is organised into three main elements which report to the Chief of Army; the Headquarters of the 1st Division, Special Operations Command and Forces Command. As of 2017, approximately 85% of Army personnel were in units assigned to Forces Command, which is responsible for preparing units and individuals for operations. Headquarters 1st Division is responsible for high-level training activities and is capable of being deployed to command large scale ground operations. Only a small number of units are permanently assigned to the 1st Division; these include the 2nd Battalion, Royal Australian Regiment which forms the pre-landing force for the Australian Amphibious Force, a signals regiment and three training and personnel support units.

The Australian Army's main combat forces are grouped in brigades. Its main conventional forces are three regular combat brigades which are organised on a common structure; the 1st, 3rd and 7th Brigades. Support for the units in these formations is provided by an aviation brigade (16th Aviation Brigade), a combat support and ISTAR brigade (6th Brigade) and a logistics brigade (the 17th Sustainment Brigade). Under a restructure of the Army's health capability, a new health brigade, designated the 2nd Health Brigade, will be raised in 2023. In addition, there are six Army Reserve brigades; these brigades are administered by the 2nd Division and "paired" with the three regular combat brigades. The Army's main tactical formations are combined arms battlegroups made up of elements drawn from different units.

The Special Operations Command commands the Army's special forces units. It comprises the Special Air Service Regiment, the 2nd Commando Regiment, the reserve 1st Commando Regiment and the Special Operations Engineer Regiment as well as logistics and training units. The Army's special forces units have been expanded since 2001 and are well equipped and capable of being deployed by sea, air or land. As of 2014, Special Operations Command comprised approximately 2,200 personnel.

=== Royal Australian Air Force ===
The Royal Australian Air Force (RAAF) is the air power branch of the ADF. The RAAF has modern combat and transport aircraft and a network of bases in strategic locations across Australia.

The RAAF has a single operational command, Air Command. Air Command is the operational arm of the RAAF and consists of Air Combat Group, Air Mobility Group, Surveillance and Response Group, Combat Support Group, Air Warfare Centre and Air Force Training Group. Each group consists of several wings.

The RAAF has twentyfive flying squadrons; five combat squadrons, two maritime patrol squadrons, six transport squadrons, six training squadrons (including three Operational Conversion Units and a forward air control training squadron) as well as one Airborne Early Warning & Control squadron and a Joint Terminal Attack Controller squadron. The ground units supporting these flying squadrons include three expeditionary combat support squadrons, three security force squadrons and a range of intelligence, air traffic control, communications, radar and medical units.

== Logistic support ==
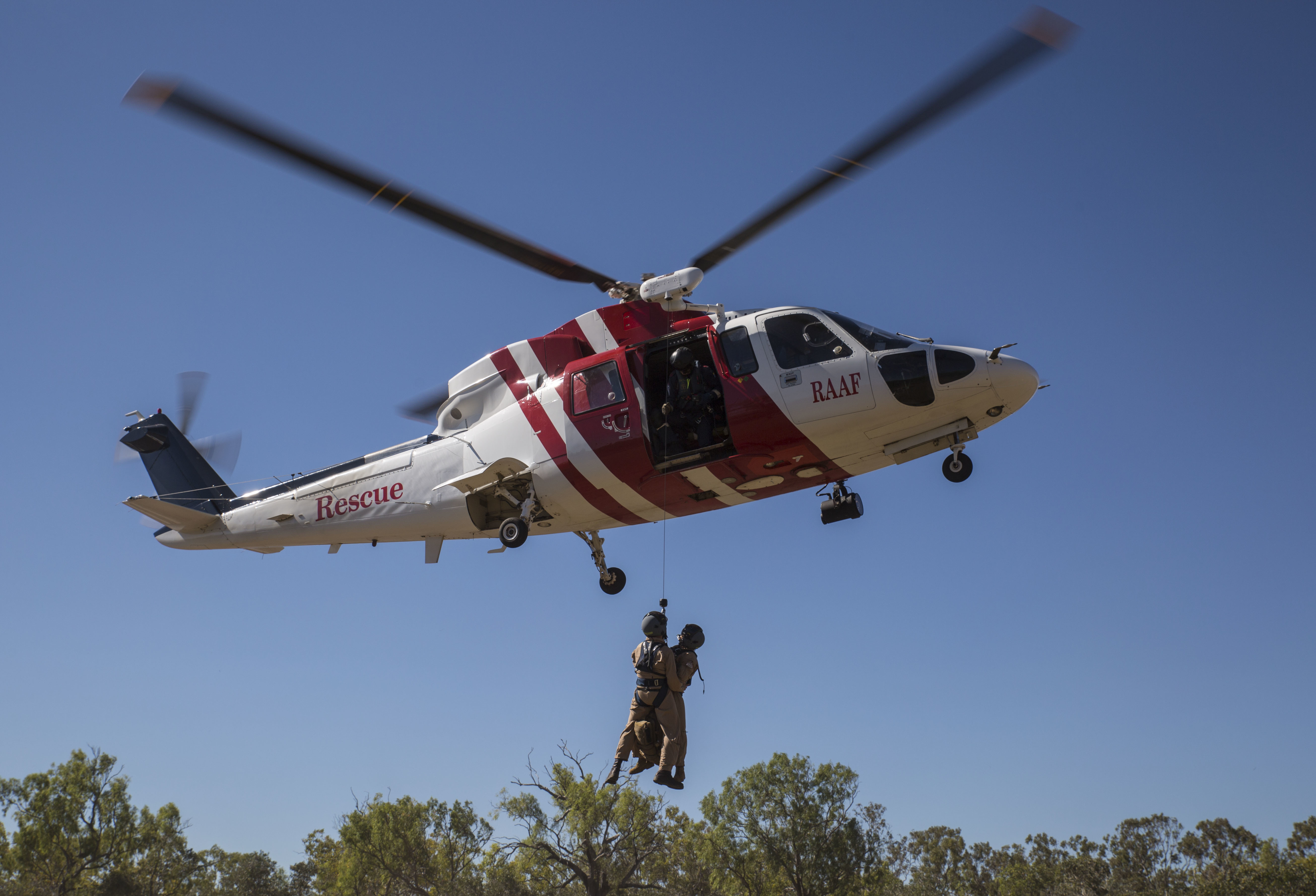
CHC Helicopters has been contracted to provide search and rescue and crash response services to all three branches of the ADF

The ADF's logistics are managed by the Department of Defence's Capability Acquisition and Sustainment Group (CASG). The CASG was established in 2015 from the previously semi-independent Defence Materiel Organisation. CASG is responsible for the acquisition of all materiel (except guided weapons and explosive ordnance) and services used by the ADF and maintaining this equipment throughout its life of type.

CASG is not directly responsible for supplying deployed ADF units; this is the responsibility of the Joint Logistics Command (JLC) and the single service logistic units, instead CASG has responsibility for the supply and transport of materiel from manufacturers to supply depots. These units include the Navy's Strategic Command and replenishment ships, the Army's 17th Sustainment Brigade and Combat Service Support Battalions, and the Combat Support Group RAAF.

The ADF maintains stockpiles of ammunition, fuel and other supplies. Since the late 1990s, ammunition for the three services has been stored in a network of facilities managed by the JLC. The creation of a GWEO Group moved the responsibility of acquisition and sustainment of Explosive Materiel within the ADF from JLC and CASG to itself. The ADF also holds several months' worth of fuel for the Navy's vessels and several weeks' worth for aircraft and vehicles. A number of defence analysts have raised concerns over the adequacy of the fuel stockpile, especially as Australia is largely dependent on imports which could be disrupted in the event of war.

The increasing role of the private sector forms an important trend in the ADF's logistics arrangements. During the 1990s many of the ADF's support functions were transferred to the private sector to improve the efficiency with which they were provided. Since these reforms most of the "garrison" support services at military bases have been provided by private firms. The reforms also led to many of the ADF's logistics units being disbanded or reduced in size. Since this time private firms have increasingly been contracted to provide critical support to ADF units deployed outside Australia. This support has included transporting equipment and personnel and constructing and supplying bases.

== Military intelligence and surveillance ==
The Australian Defence Force's intelligence collection and analysis capabilities include each of the services' intelligence systems and units, two joint civilian-military intelligence gathering agencies and two strategic and operational-level intelligence analysis organisations.

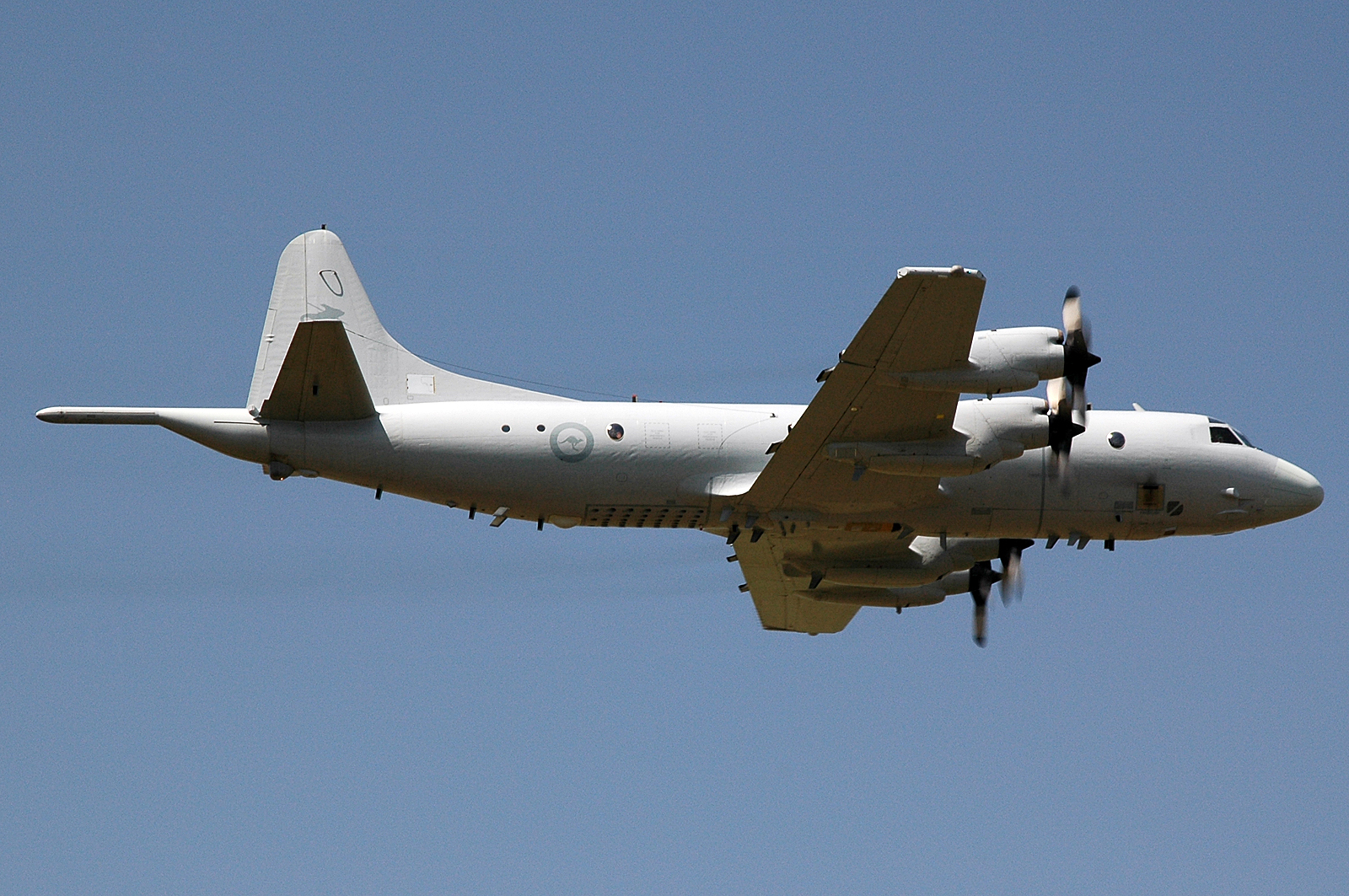
A Royal Australian Air Force AP-3C Orion aircraft. These aircraft are fitted with advanced signals intelligence and electronic signals intelligence equipment.

Each of the three services has its own intelligence collection assets. RAN doctrine stresses the importance of collecting a wide range of information and combining it to inform decisions. It also notes that the Collins-class submarines are particularly effective sources of "acoustic, electromagnetic and environmental information". The Army's intelligence and surveillance units include the 1st Intelligence Battalion, 7th Signal Regiment (Electronic Warfare), 20th Surveillance and Target Acquisition Regiment, three Regional Force Surveillance Units and the Special Air Service Regiment. The RAAF monitors the airspace of Australia and neighbouring countries using the Vigilare system, which combines input from the service's Jindalee Operational Radar Network, other ADF air defence radars (including airborne and naval systems) and civilian air traffic control radars. The RAAF's other intelligence assets include No. 87 Squadron and the AP-3C Orion aircraft operated by No. 92 Wing. A C band radar and a telescope located at Naval Communication Station Harold E. Holt provide a space situational awareness capability, which includes tracking space assets and debris. Australia also provides personnel to the US Joint Space Operations Center in Colorado Springs which tracks and identifies any man-made object in orbit.

The Defence Strategic Policy and Intelligence Group within the Department of Defence supports the services and co-operates with the civilian agencies within the Australian Intelligence Community. This Group consists of the Australian Geospatial-Intelligence Organisation (AGO), Australian Signals Directorate (ASD) and Defence Intelligence Organisation (DIO). The AGO is responsible for geospatial intelligence and producing maps for the ADF, the ASD, originally the Defence Signals Directorate, is Australia's signals intelligence agency, and the DIO is responsible for the analysis of intelligence collected by the other intelligence agencies. The three agencies are headquartered in Canberra, though the AGO has staff in Bendigo and the ASD maintains permanent signals collection facilities in other locations.

The ASD also includes the Australian Cyber Security Centre (ACSC) which is responsible for protecting Defence and other Australian Government agencies against cyberwarfare attacks. The ACSC was established in January 2010 and is jointly staffed by the ASD and personnel from the Attorney-General's Department, Australian Security Intelligence Organisation, and Australian Federal Police. Unlike the United States military, the ADF does not class cyberwarfare as being a separate sphere of warfare. In July 2017 an Information Warfare Division was raised, tasked with both defensive and offensive cyber operations.

The Australian Secret Intelligence Service (ASIS) has been involved in ADF operations since the Vietnam War including East Timor, Iraq and Afghanistan. In 2012, the Director-General of ASIS stated that the service's agents had saved the lives of Australian soldiers, enabled special forces operations and that "it's difficult to see a situation in the future where the ADF would deploy without ASIS alongside". It has been reported that one of the Special Air Service Regiment's squadrons works with ASIS and has undertaken independent covert intelligence-collection operations outside Australia.

== Personnel ==
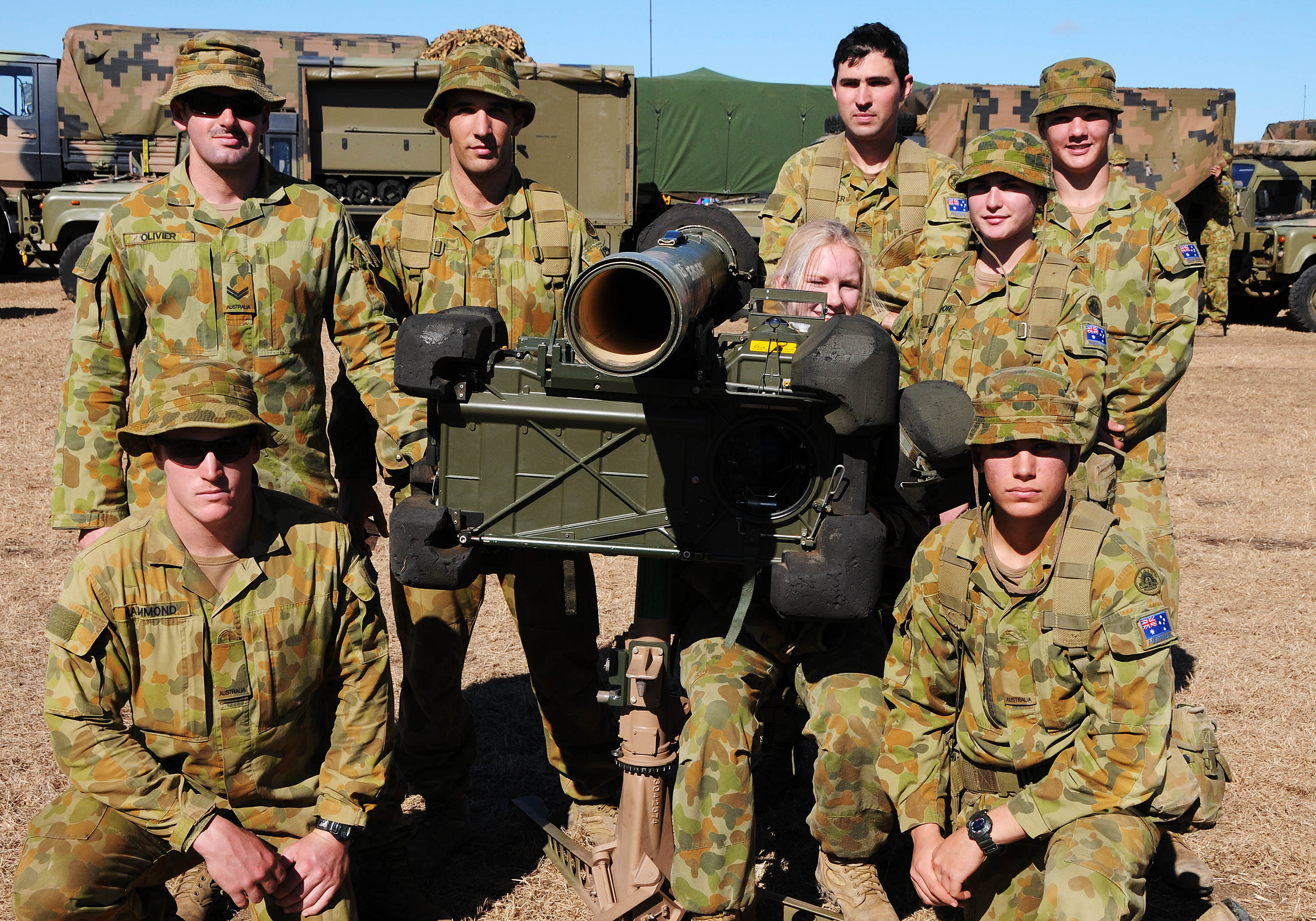
Personnel from the Army's 16th Air Land Regiment with one of the unit's RBS 70 systems

The Australian military has been an all-volunteer force since the abolition of conscription in 1972. Both men and women can enlist in the ADF, with women being able to apply for all roles. Only Australian citizens and permanent residents who are eligible for Australian citizenship can enlist. Recruits must be aged at least 17, and meet health, educational and aptitude standards. The ADF is one of the few areas of the Australian Government to continue to have compulsory retirement ages: permanent personnel must retire at 60 years of age and reservists at 65. Both permanent and reserve personnel can work through flexible arrangements, including part-time hours or remotely from their duty station, subject to approval. Discipline of defence personnel is guided by the Defence Force Discipline Act 1982, ultimately overseen by the Judge Advocate General of the ADF.

Australian demographic trends will put pressure on the ADF in the future. Excluding other factors, the ageing of the Australian population will result in smaller numbers of potential recruits entering the Australian labour market each year. Some predictions are that population ageing will result in slower economic growth and increased government expenditure on pensions and health programs. As a result of these trends, the ageing of Australia's population may worsen the ADF's manpower situation and may force the Government to reallocate some of the Defence budget. Few young Australians consider joining the military and the ADF has to compete for recruits against private sector firms which are able to offer higher salaries.

=== Personnel numbers ===
As of 30 June 2025, the ADF comprised 58,909 permanent (full-time) and 33,269 active reserve (part-time) personnel. Compared to 57,036 permanent and 24,028 active reserve personnel eleven years prior in June 2014. The Army is the largest service, followed by the RAAF and RAN. The ADO also employed 20,545 civilian Australian Public Service (APS) staff as at 30 June 2025. During the 2024–25 financial year 6,228 people enlisted in the ADF on a permanent basis and 4,562 left, representing a net gain of 1,664 personnel.

The distribution of ADF personnel between the services and categories of service on 30 June 2025 was as follows:

Service	Permanent	Active Reserve	Total
Navy	15,123	4,763	19,886
Army	27,701	22,146	49,847
Air Force	16,085	6,360	22,445
Total	58,909	33,269	92,178

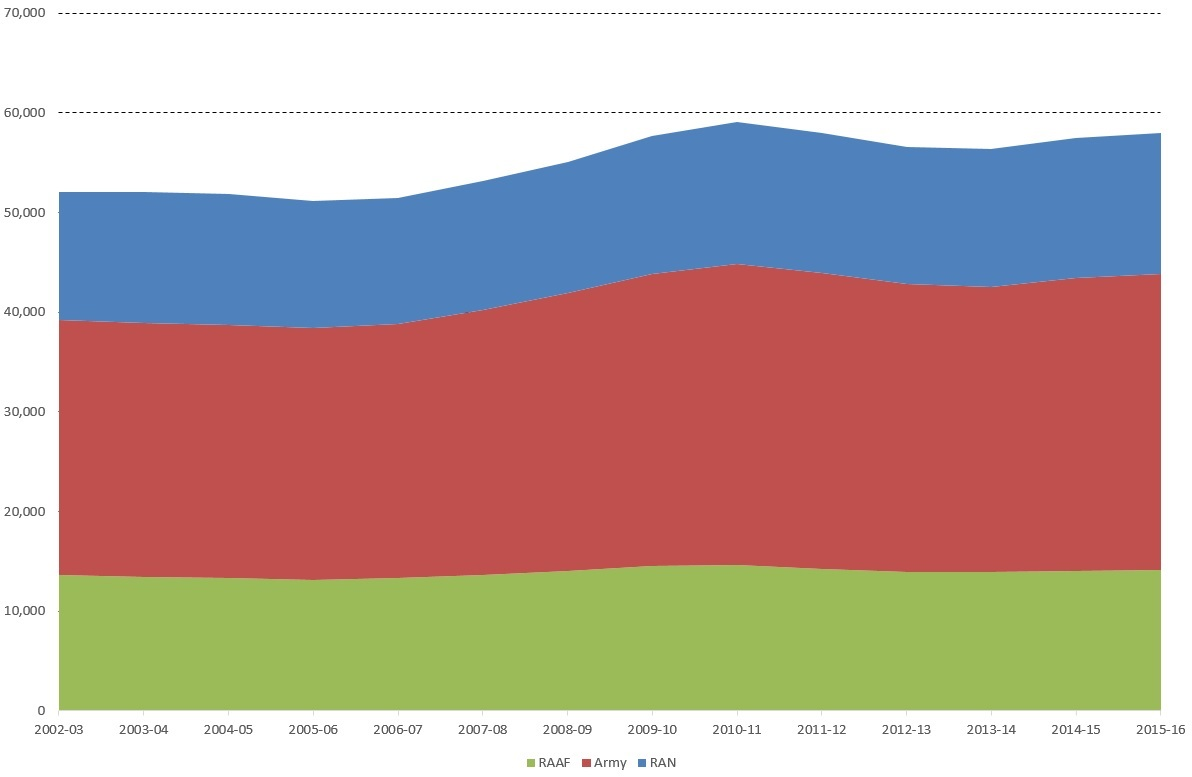
The average permanent strengths of the services between the 2002–03 and 2015–16 financial years

The number of ADF personnel has changed over the last 20 years. During the 1990s the strength of the ADF was reduced from around 70,000 to 50,000 permanent personnel as a result of budget cuts and the outsourcing of some military functions. The ADF began to grow from 2000 after the defence white paper released that year called for an expansion to the military's strength, though the size of the military decreased between the 2003–04 to 2005–06 financial years due to problems with attracting further recruits. By 2009–10 the ADF was above its budgeted size, leading to reductions until 2014–15. The size of the ADF grew between the 2014–15 and 2016–17 financial years. The ADF has not met its recruitment targets over the period since the 1995–96 financial year.

Whilst the ADF is the largest military in Oceania, it is small compared to most Asian military forces ranking 8th out of 27 countries in Asia in 2024 according to the Lowy Institute. According to a 2021 Joint Standing Committee on Foreign Affairs, Defence and Trade parliamentary report, the "Committee [was] concerned that the ADF is too small to credibly field sufficient rotational combat forces for protracted high-end combat operations, either as a lead or contributing nation".

Both the number of personnel in the ADF and the share of the Australian population this represents is smaller than that in many countries in Australia's immediate region. Several NATO member countries, including France and the United States, also have a higher share of their population in the military. This is a continuation of long-term trends, as outside of major wars Australia has always had a relatively small military. The size of the force is a result of Australia's relatively small population and the military being structured around a maritime strategy focused on the RAN and RAAF rather than a manpower-intensive army.

In March 2022, Prime Minister Scott Morrison announced that by 2040 the strength of the ADF would grow by around 30% to be almost 80,000 permanent personnel. The expansion is estimated to cost at least A$38 billion which includes increasing the number of APS personnel.

In June 2024, the government announced a new policy to grow the ADF as outlined in the National Defence Strategy released in April 2024. Under the policy, permanent residents who have lived in Australia for 12 months from countries in the Five Eyes alliance will become eligible to join the ADF. From July 2024, New Zealand permanent residents will be eligible to join the ADF. From January 2025, permanent residents from the United Kingdom, United States and Canada will be eligible to join the ADF. Once the person has served 90 days in the ADF they will become eligible for Australian citizenship and would be expected to apply. In October 2026, the government announced that Papua New Guinean residents who are students or recent graduates from PNG's two major universities will be able to apply to join the ADF with fifty places available in 2027 and another fifty in 2028. The PNG recruits will have to obtain Australian citizenship to serve in the ADF "once they become eligible to do so".

=== Reserves ===
Each of the branches of the ADF has a reserve component. These forces are the Royal Australian Naval Reserve, Australian Army Reserve and Royal Australian Air Force Reserve. The main role of the reserves is to supplement the permanent elements of the ADF during deployments and crises, including natural disasters. This can include attaching individual reservists to regular units or deploying units composed entirely of reserve personnel. As reservists serve on a part-time basis, they are less costly to the government than permanent members of the ADF, but the nature of their service can mean that reservists have a lower level of readiness than regular personnel and require further training before they can be deployed. It has historically proven difficult to set a level of training requirements which allows reservists to be rapidly deployable yet does not act as a disincentive to recruitment and continued participation. Successive governments since the 1960s have also been reluctant to use the "call out" powers to require reservists to undertake active service.

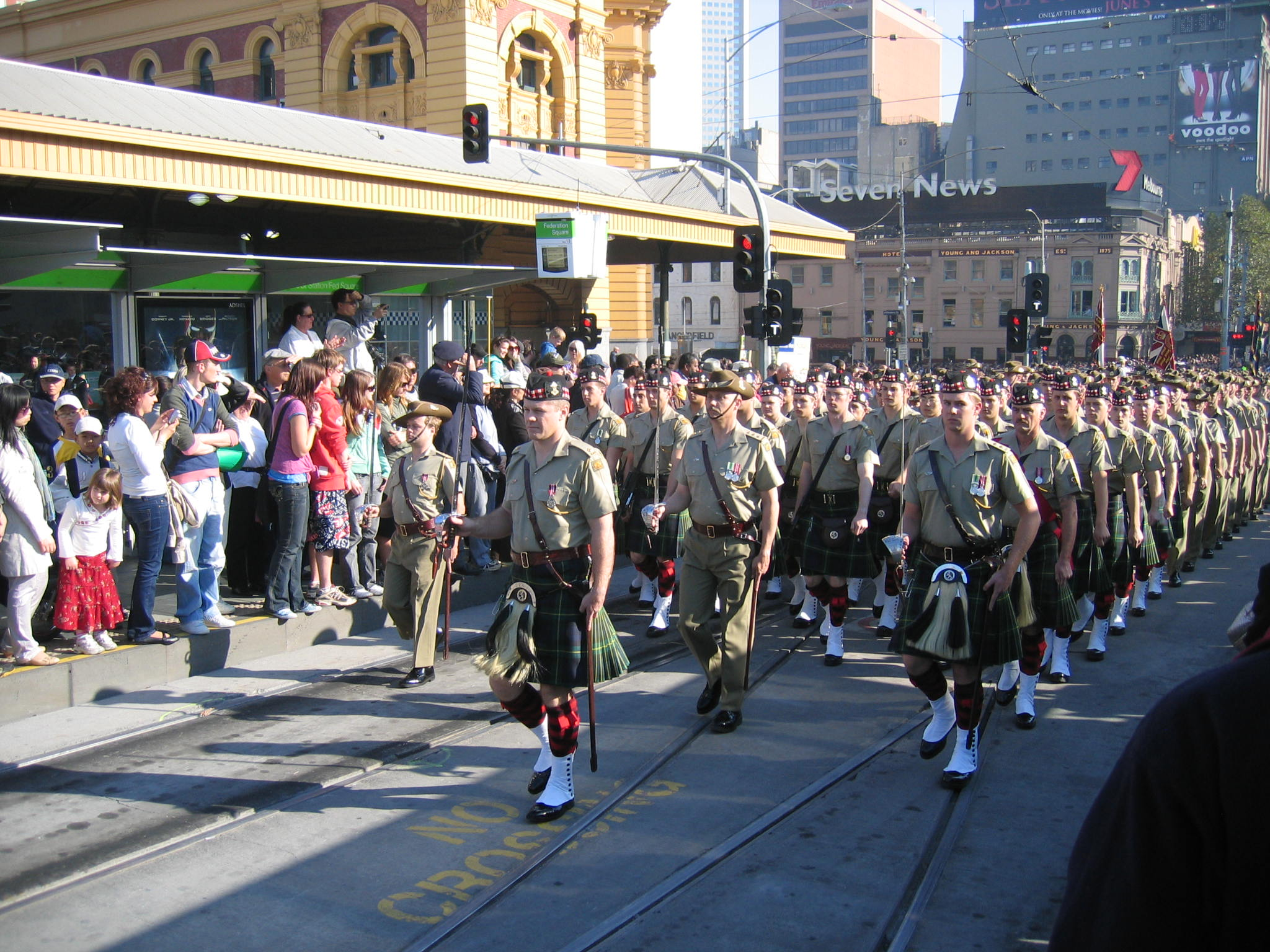
Members of the Army Reserve 5th/6th Battalion, Royal Victoria Regiment marching through Melbourne on Anzac Day 2006

There are two main categories of reserve personnel; those in the active reserve and those in the standby reserve. Members of the active reserve have an annual minimum training obligation. Reservists can volunteer to undertake more than the minimum periods of training and active service. Members of the standby reserve are not required to undertake training, and would only be called up in response to a national emergency or to fill a specialised position. Most standby reservists are former full-time members of the ADF. Between 2016 and 2026 former ADF personnel were liable for five years availability for the standby reserve. This was increased to ten years from October 2026 for personnel who enlisted after that date.

While Australian Naval Reserve personnel are assigned to permanent units, most members of the Army Reserve and Air Force Reserve are members of reserve units. Most of the RAAF's reserve units are not intended to be deployed, and reserve personnel are generally attached to regular air force units during their periods of active service. The Army Reserve is organised into permanent combat and support units, though most are currently manned at levels well below their authorised strengths and are not capable of deploying as formed units.

The ADF's increased activities since 1999 and shortfalls in recruiting permanent personnel has led to reservists being more frequently called to active service. This has included large scale domestic deployments, which have included providing security for major events such as the 2000 Summer Olympics and responding to natural disasters. Large numbers of reserve personnel have also been deployed as part of ADF operations in Australia's region; this has included the deployment of Army Reserve rifle companies to East Timor and the Solomon Islands. Smaller numbers of reservists have taken part in operations in locations distant from Australia. Notably, companies of the Army Reserve 1st Commando Regiment were regularly deployed to Afghanistan as part of the Special Operations Task Group.

=== Training ===
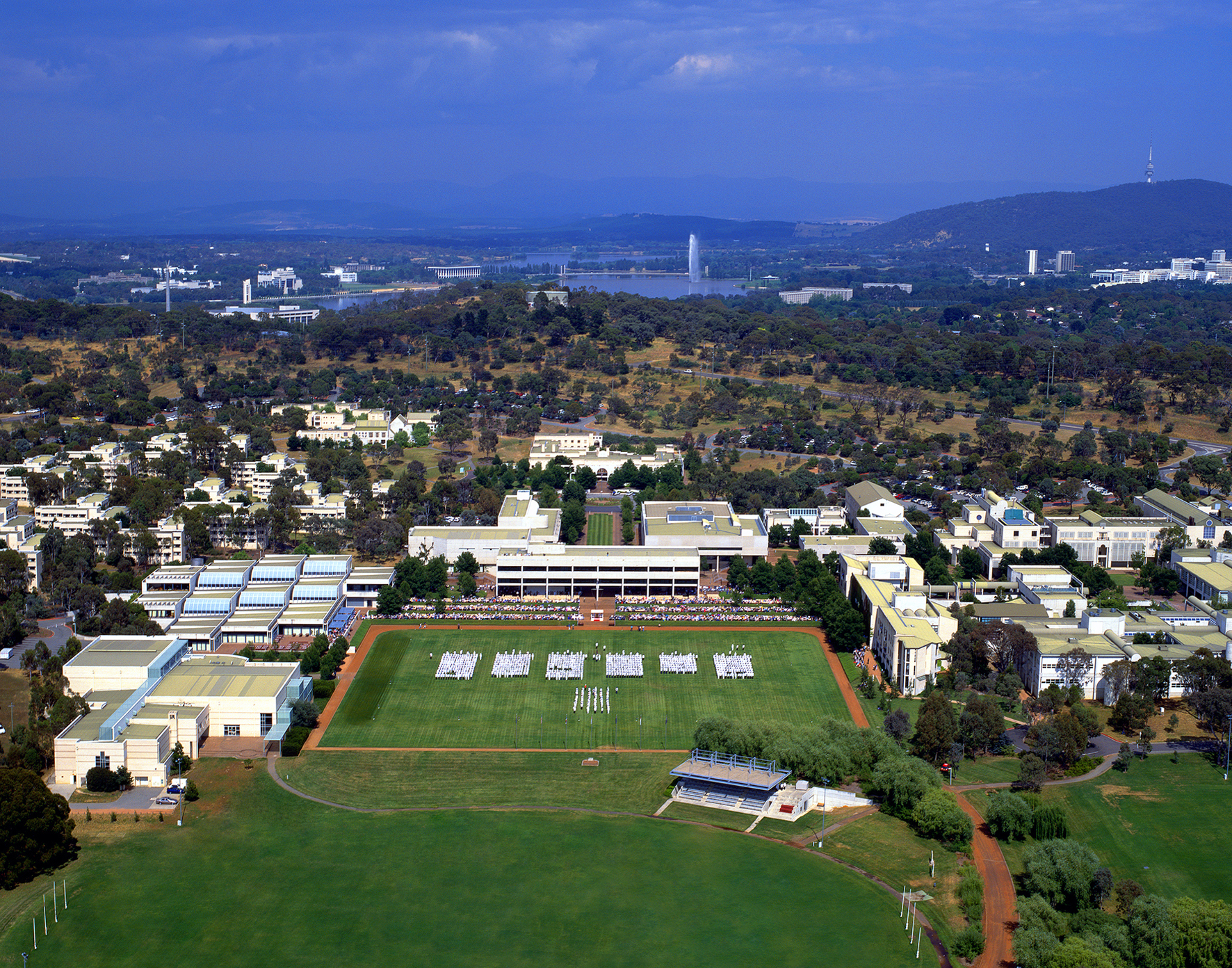
The Australian Defence Force Academy in Canberra

Individual training of Australian servicemen and women is generally provided by the services in their own training institutions. Each service has its own training organisation to manage this individual training. Where possible, however, individual training is increasingly being provided through tri-service schools.

Military academies include HMAS Creswell for the Navy, Royal Military College, Duntroon, for the Army, and the Officers' Training School for the Air Force. The Australian Defence Force Academy is a tri-service university for officer cadets of all services who wish to attain a university degree through the ADF. Navy recruit training is conducted at HMAS Cerberus, Army recruits are trained at the Army Recruit Training Centre and Air Force recruits at RAAF Base Wagga.

=== Women in the ADF ===
Women first served in the Australian military during World War II when each service established a separate female branch. The RAAF was the first service to fully integrate women into operational units, doing so in 1977, with the Army and RAN following in 1979 and 1985 respectively. The ADF initially struggled to integrate women, with integration being driven by changing Australian social values and Government legislation rather than a change in attitudes within the male-dominated military.

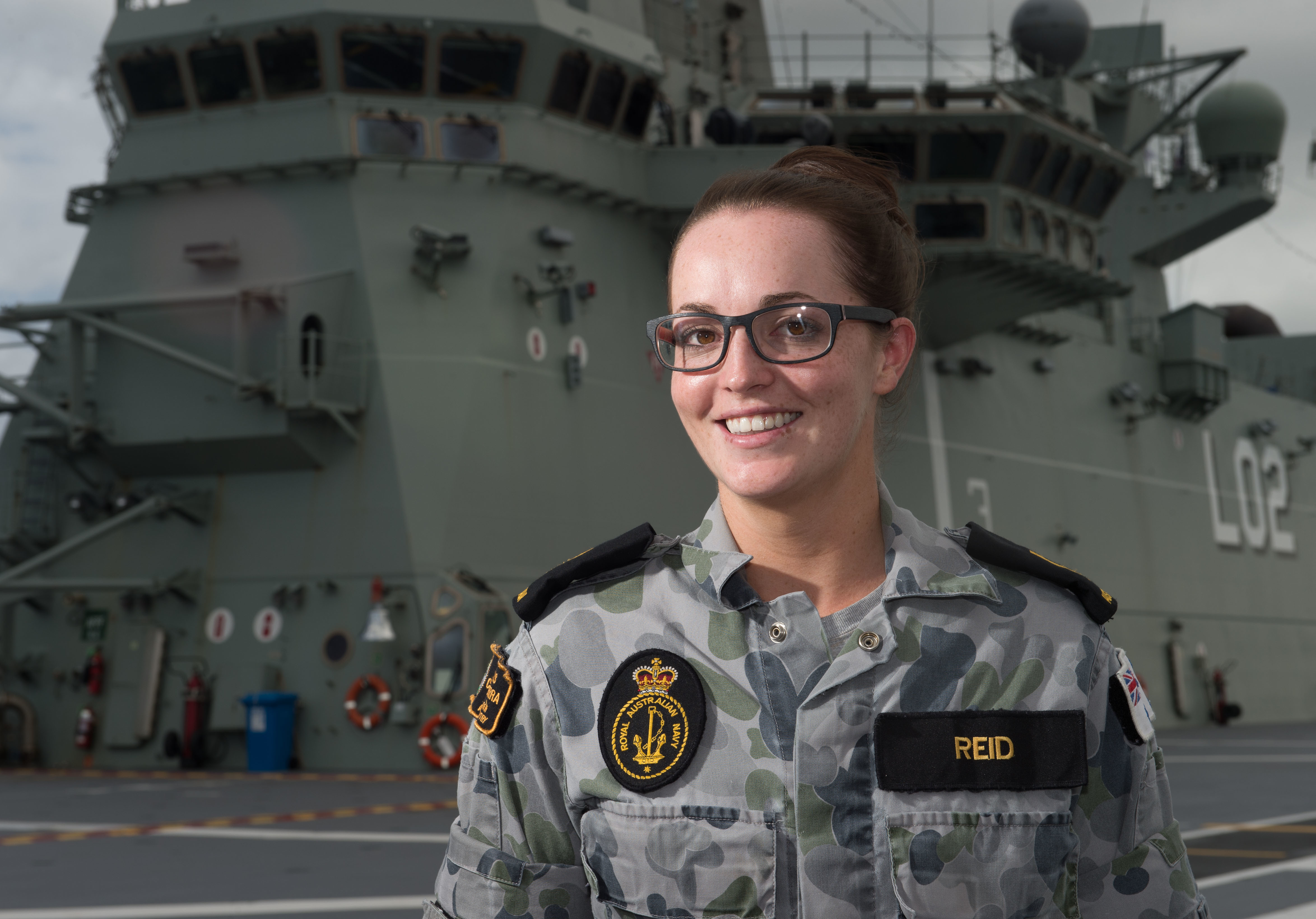
A female sailor assigned to HMAS Canberra in 2016

The number of positions available to women in the ADF has increased over time. Although servicewomen were initially barred from combat positions, these restrictions began to be lifted in 1990. In September 2011 Minister for Defence Stephen Smith announced that the Cabinet had decided to remove all restrictions on women serving in combat positions, and that this change would come into effect within five years. This decision was supported by the CDF and the chiefs of the services. Serving women became able to apply for all positions on 1 January 2013 except special forces roles in the Army which became open to women in January 2014. In January 2016, civilian women became able to be directly recruited to all positions.

Despite the expansion in the number of positions available to women and other changes which aim to encourage increased female recruitment and retention, the growth in the proportion of female permanent defence personnel has been slow. In the 1989–1990 financial year women made up 11.4% of the ADF personnel. In the 2008–2009 financial year women occupied 13.5% of ADF positions. During the same period the proportion of civilian positions filled by women in the Australian Defence Organisation increased from 30.8% to 42.8%. In 2023–2024, women made up 20.7% of the ADF's permanent force. The proportion of women in the permanent force differs by service: 15.3% of members of the Army are women, compared to 24.1% of the RAN and 27% for the RAAF. In 2024, the ADF adopted targets to increase the proportion of women in the ADF's permanent force to 25% by 2030 and the proportion of women in the services by 2030 of: 28% in the RAN, 18% in the Army and 35% in the RAAF.

There continue to be concerns over the incidence of sexual abuse and gender-based discrimination in the ADF. In 2014 the Defence Abuse Response Taskforce estimated that around 1,100 currently-serving ADF personnel had abused other members of the military, and recommended that a royal commission be conducted to investigate long-running allegations of sexual abuse and assault of servicewomen at the Australian Defence Force Academy. In 2013 Chief of Army General David Morrison publicly released a video in which he warned against gender-based discrimination, and stated that he would dismiss members of the Army who engaged in such conduct.

=== Ethnic and religious composition ===
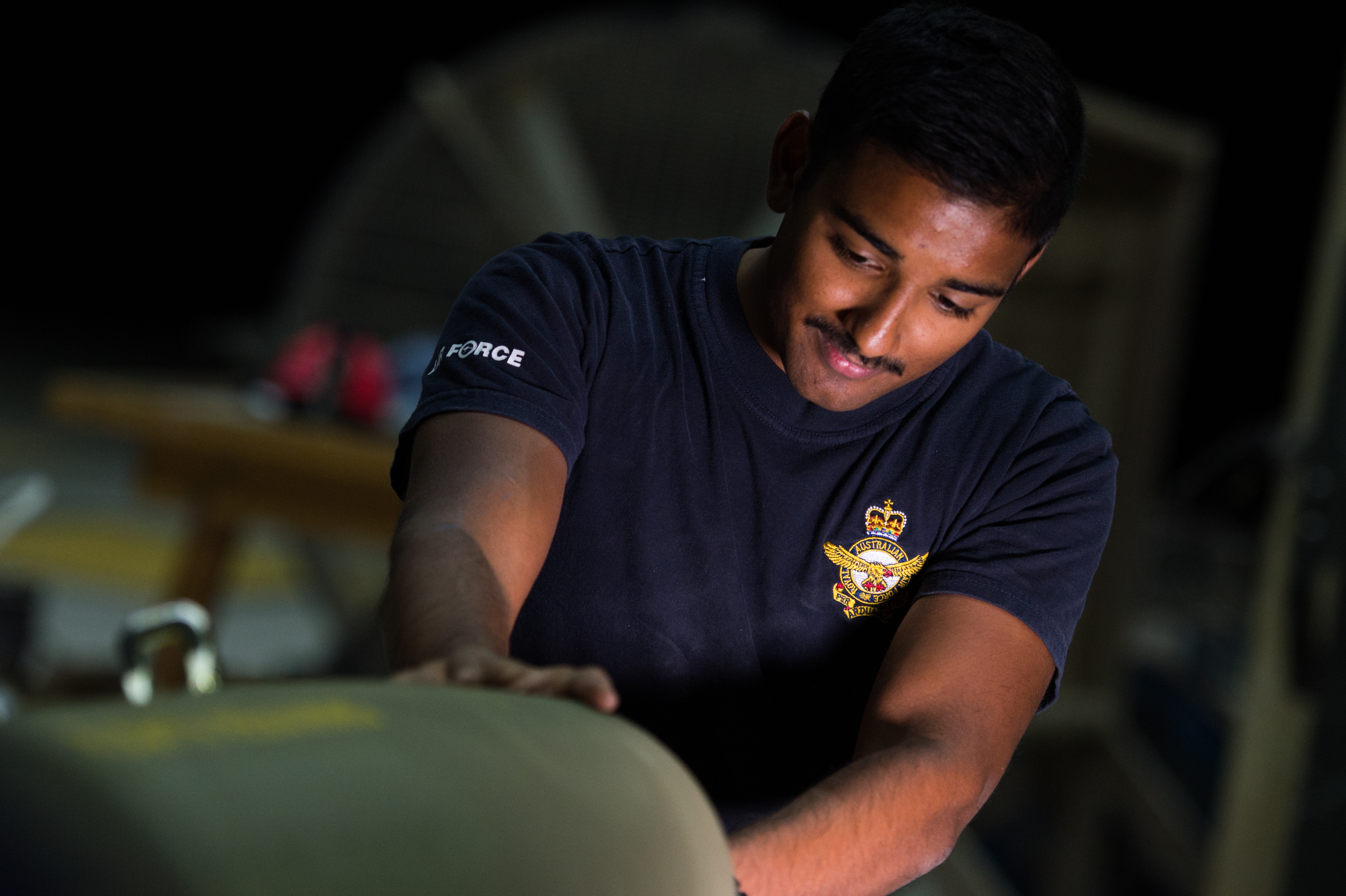
A RAAF airman assembling a bomb

A high percentage of ADF personnel are drawn from the Anglo-Celtic portion of Australia's population. In 2011 the proportion of ADF personnel born in Australia and the other predominately Anglo-Celtic countries was higher than this population group's share of both the Australian workforce and overall population. As a result, analyst Mark Thomson has argued that the ADF is unrepresentative of Australia's society in this regard and that recruiting more personnel from other ethnic backgrounds would improve the ADF's language skills and cultural empathy. In 2013, the ADF launched the Defence Diversity and Inclusion Strategy 2012-2017 to recruit more volunteers from culturally and linguistically diverse backgrounds and to improve statistics collection.

On 30 June 2025, 3.9% of ADF permanent personnel and 3.0% of Reserves were Indigenous Australians. The Defence Reconciliation Action Plan 2019-2022 had aimed to increase the number of Indigenous Australians the ADF recruits and to improve their retention rate, and had set a target of 5% Indigenous representation by 2025. Restrictions on Indigenous Australians' ability to enlist in the military existed until the 1970s, though hundreds of Indigenous men and women had joined the military when restrictions were reduced during the world wars. By 1992 the representation of Indigenous Australians in the ADF was equivalent to their proportion of the Australian population, though they continue to be under-represented among the officer corps. Two of the Army's three Regional Force Surveillance Units (NORFORCE and the 51st Battalion, Far North Queensland Regiment) are manned mostly by Indigenous Australian reservists. In 2015 Indigenous Australians made up around 2% of ADF personnel, which was smaller than the Indigenous share of the total Australian population.

In line with trends across the broader Australian population, the proportion of ADF personnel who are not religious has increased considerably over recent years. The proportion of ADF personnel who reported that their religion was Christianity in service censuses and human relations databases decreased from around 66% in 2003 to just over 52% in 2015. Over this period, the proportion who stated that they do not have a religious affiliation increased from 31% to 47%. Only 1% of ADF members reported having a non-Christian religious affiliation in 2015. In 2023 it was reported that 80% of new ADF recruits did not have religious beliefs.

=== Sexuality and gender identity ===
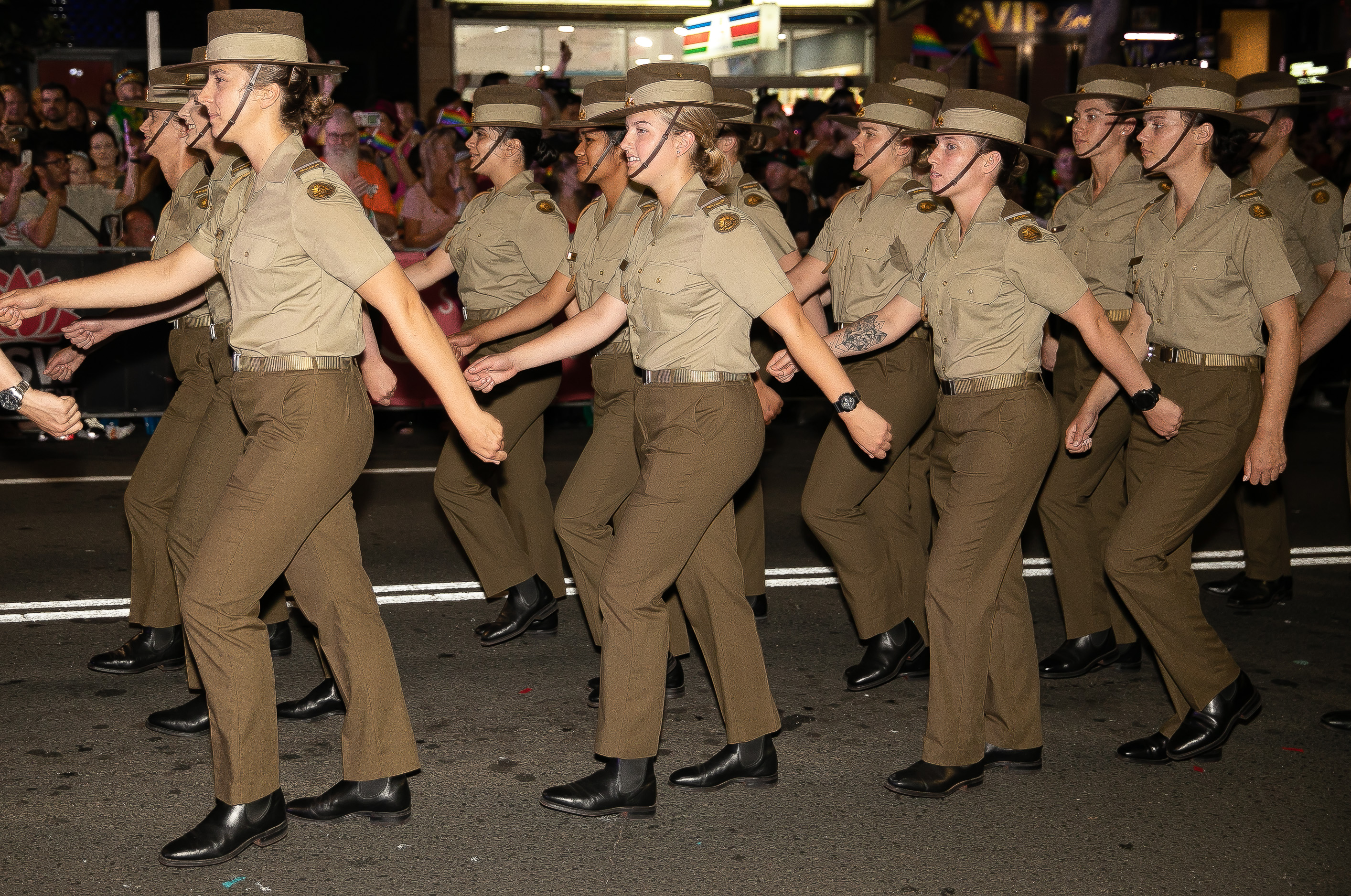
Soldiers marching in the 2020 Sydney Gay and Lesbian Mardi Gras. An official Defence contingent was permitted to begin marching in the parade during 2008, and its personnel have worn military uniforms since 2013.

Australia allows gay men and lesbians to serve openly. Openly gay and lesbian personnel were banned from the ADF until November 1992 when the Australian Government decided to remove this prohibition. The heads of the services and most military personnel opposed this change at the time, and it caused considerable public debate. Opponents of lifting the ban on gay and lesbian personnel argued that doing so would greatly harm the ADF's cohesiveness and cause large numbers of resignations. This did not eventuate, and the reform caused few problems. A 2000 study found that lifting the ban on gay service did not have any negative effects on the ADF's morale, effectiveness or recruitment and retention, and may have led to increased productivity and improved working environments. Few members of the ADF came out as lesbian, gay or bisexual until the late 1990s, however, and those who did were not always welcomed by their comrades.

ADF personnel in same-sex relationships experienced discriminatory treatment until the 2000s. This included Defence not recognising same-sex spouses, which prevented these couples from receiving the financial entitlements available to opposite-sex couples and could be a barrier to the spouse being treated as their partner's next of kin. The ADF officially recognised same-sex relationships in 2005, and since 1 January 2009 these couples have had the same access to military retirement pensions and superannuation as opposite-sex couples. Transgender personnel have been permitted to serve in the ADF since 2010, and are provided with support when necessary. Despite the removal of restrictions on gay and lesbian personnel, harassment and discrimination continued to occur; for instance a 2013 survey found that 10% of gay soldiers had experienced discrimination and more than 30% hid their sexuality. The ADF has actively encouraged the inclusion of LGBTI personnel since the mid-2010s, with its leadership highlighting the importance of the issue and the military justice system being strongly used to prevent harassment and discrimination. Defence Force Recruiting also encourages LGBTI people to enlist. As of 2023, 4.8 percent of ADF personnel identified as members of the LGBTI+ community.

== Defence expenditure and procurement ==
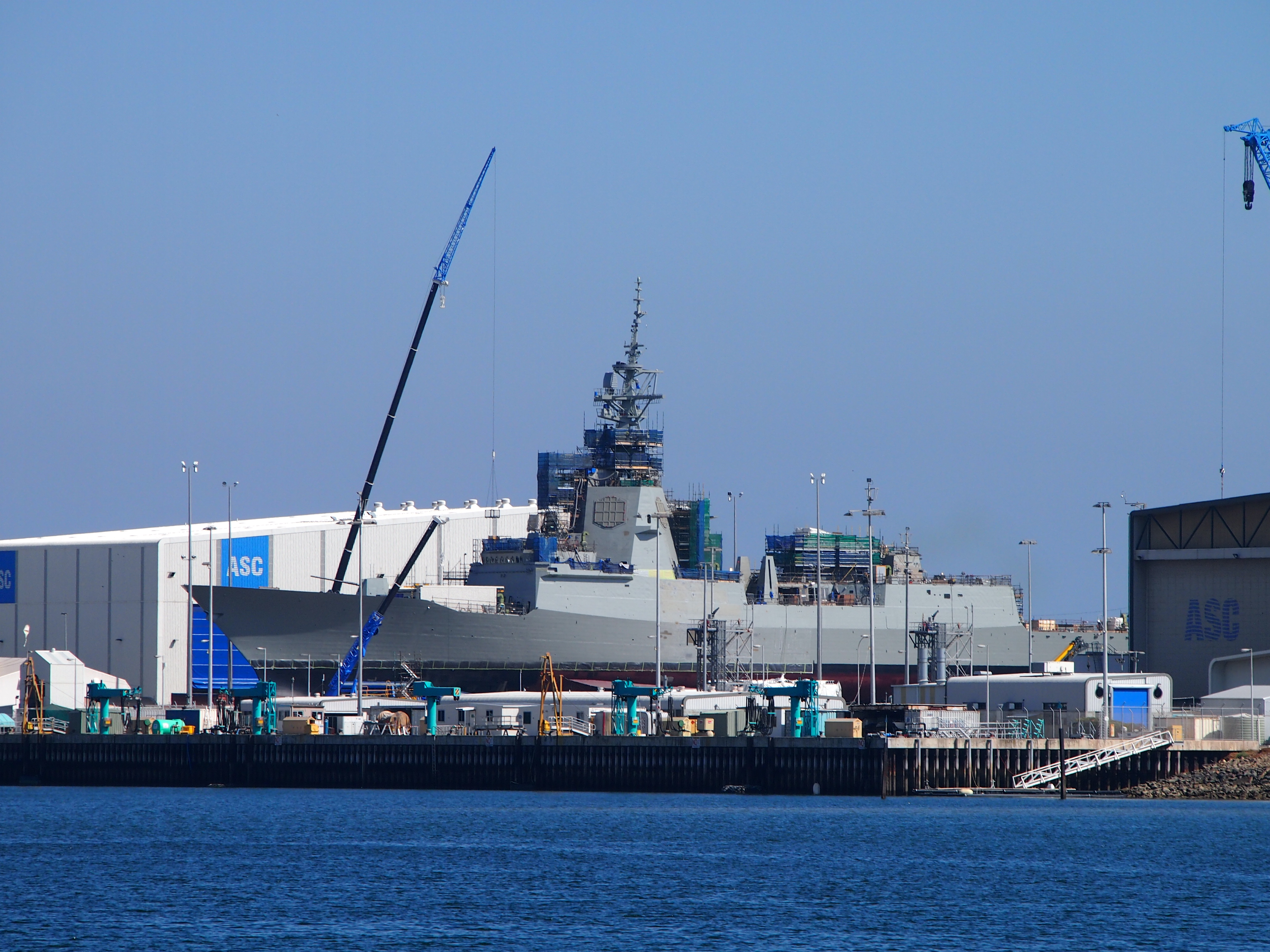
The Hobart-class destroyer HMAS Hobart under construction in 2015

=== Current expenditure ===
The Australian Government allocated A$55.7 billion to the Australian Defence Organisation in the 2024–25 financial year. This level of expenditure is equivalent to approximately 2.02% of Australian Gross Domestic Product (GDP).

Australia's defence expenditure is much larger in dollar terms to that of most countries in Australia's immediate region. The share of GDP Australia spends on defence is also larger than that in most developed economies and major South-East Asian countries. China allocates approximately the same proportion of GDP to Defence as Australia does, and has been rapidly increasing its nominal expenditure. The Stockholm International Peace Research Institute has estimated that Australia's defence spending in 2017 was the 13th highest of any country in real terms. As a proportion of GDP Australia's defence spending ranks as 49th of the countries for which data is available.

=== Long term expenditure ===
In 2024, the Australian Government released the National Defence Strategy which plans to lift defence spending to A$100.4 billion by 2033-34 which would represent 2.4% of GDP.

== Equipment ==
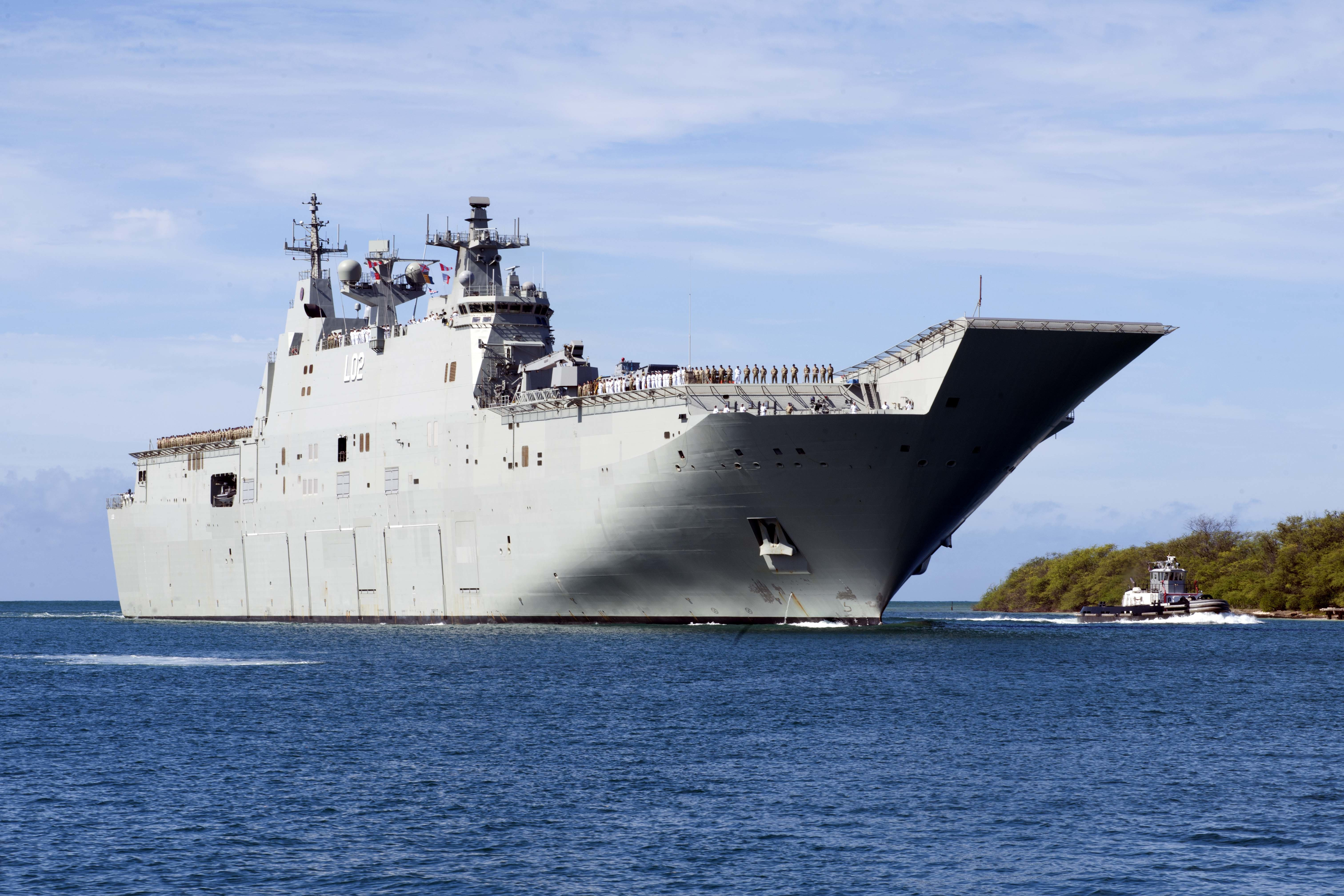
Canberra-class landing helicopter dock HMAS Canberra

The ADF seeks to be a high-technology force. Although most of the ADF's weapons are only used by single service, there is an increasing emphasis on commonality. The three services use the same small arms and the SIG Sauer P320 is the ADF's standard hand gun, the EF88 Austeyr the standard rifle, the F89 Minimi the standard light support weapon, the FN Herstal MAG-58 the standard light machine gun and the Browning M2HB the standard heavy machine gun.

The ADF is equipped with conventional weapons only. Australia does not possess weapons of mass destruction and has ratified the Biological Weapons Convention, Chemical Weapons Convention and Nuclear Non-Proliferation Treaty. The Australian Government is committed to encouraging nuclear disarmament internationally. Australia is also a party to international agreements which prohibit land mines and cluster munitions.

As of 2025, the Royal Australian Navy operated a large number of ships and submarines. The Navy's main surface combatants were seven Anzac-class frigates and three Hobart-class destroyers. The RAN's submarine force had six Collins-class submarines. There were three Armidale-class and ten Cape-class patrol boats for border security and fisheries patrol duties in Australia's northern waters. The RAN's amphibious force comprises the two Canberra-class landing helicopter docks and the dock landing ship HMAS Choules. The Navy's minesweeping force is equipped with three Huon-class minehunters. Two Supply-class replenishment oilers support these combatants. The RAN also operated one survey vessel the Leeuwin. Non-commissioned ships operated by the RAN include the sail training ship Young Endeavour. There were also four auxiliary ships operated by private companies on behalf of the RAN. The Fleet Air Arm's helicopter force comprised 23 MH-60R Seahawk anti-submarine and a training force equipped with 15 EC 135T2+ helicopters.

The Australian Army is equipped with a wide range of equipment in order to be able to employ combined arms approaches in combat. As of 2025, the Army's armoured fighting vehicle holdings included 27 M1A2 SEPv3 Abrams main battle tanks, 416 M113AS4 armoured personnel carriers, 221 ASLAV armoured reconnaissance vehicles and 25 Boxer combat reconnaissance vehicles. The Army had approximately 875 Bushmaster Protected Mobility Vehicles in service and had 1,098 Hawkei protected mobility vehicles. The Army's artillery holdings consisted of 48 155 mm towed M777 howitzers, 2 M142 HIMARS multiple rocket launchers, 176 81 mm M252A1 mortars, 7 NASAMS-3 medium range surface-to-air missile systems and FGM-148 Javelin anti-tank missiles. Australian Army Aviation operated several different models of helicopters. These included 14 CH-47F Chinook, 17 UH-60M Black Hawks, 5 EC 135T3+ leased from the United Kingdom, and 6 Boeing AH-64E Apache attack helicopters (as of September 2026). The Army also operated 15 RQ-7B Shadow 2000 uncrewed aerial vehicles. The Army's fleet of watercraft at this time included 15 LCM-8 landing craft.

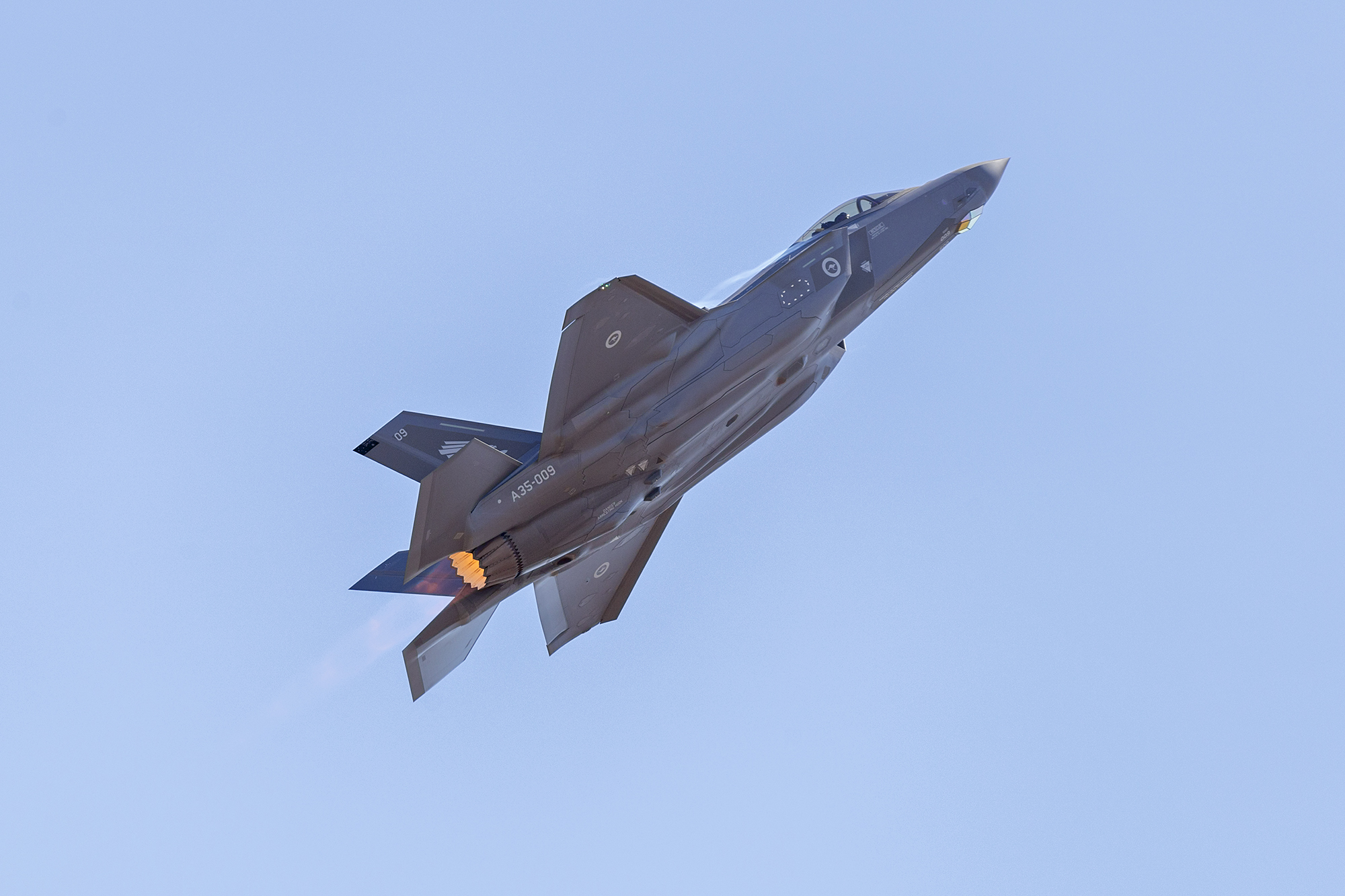
An RAAF F-35A at the 2019 Australian International Airshow in Avalon, Victoria

The Royal Australian Air Force operates combat, maritime patrol, transport and training aircraft. As of 2025, the combat aircraft force comprised 63 F-35A Lightning IIs, 24 F/A-18F Super Hornets and 12 EA-18G Growlers. The intelligence, surveillance and reconnaissance force was equipped with 12 P-8 Poseidon maritime patrol aircraft and 6 E-7A Wedgetail AEW&C aircraft. The air transport force operated 12 C-130J-30 Super Hercules, 8 C-17 Globemaster IIIs and 10 C-27J Spartans. A further 12 Super King Air 350s were used in both the transport and training roles. The RAAF also operated 3 Challenger and 2 Boeing 737 aircraft as VIP transports. The RAAF had seven KC-30 Multi-Role Tanker Transports. The RAAF's training units were equipped with 49 PC-21s and 33 Hawk 127s. The RAAF was also equipped with 3 MQ-4C unmanned aerial vehicles.

== Bases ==
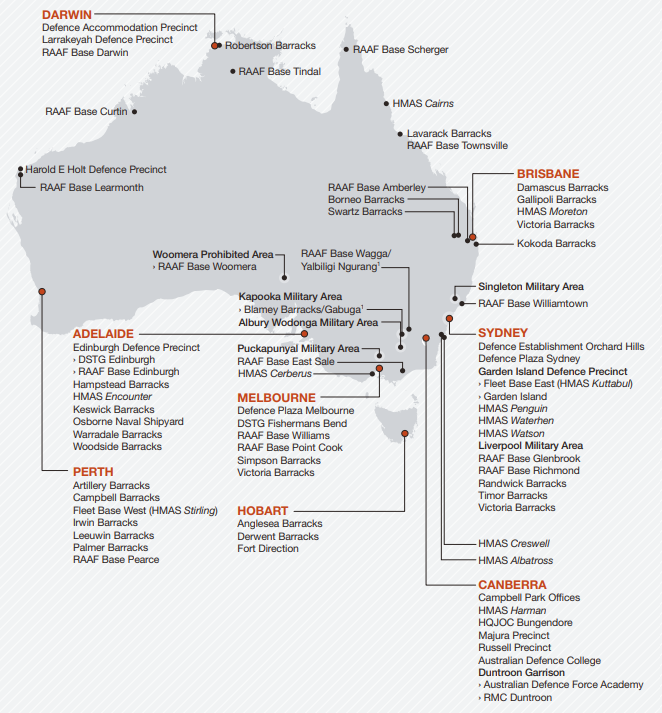
A map of the ADF's main bases in Australia, as of 2025

The Australian Defence Force maintains 60 major bases and many other facilities across all the states and territories of Australia. These bases occupy millions of hectares of land, giving the ADO Australia's largest real estate portfolio. Defence Housing Australia manages around 19,000 residences occupied by members of the ADF. While most of the Army's permanent force units are based in northern Australia, the majority of Navy and Air Force units are based near Sydney, Brisbane and Perth. Few ADF bases are currently shared by different services. Small Army and RAAF units are also located at Royal Malaysian Air Force Base Butterworth. The administrative headquarters of the ADF and the three services is located in Canberra alongside the main offices of the Department of Defence.

The Royal Australian Navy has two main bases; Fleet Base East (HMAS Kuttabul) in Sydney and Fleet Base West (HMAS Stirling) near Perth. The Navy's operational headquarters, Fleet Headquarters, is located adjacent to Fleet Base East. The majority of the Navy's patrol boats are based at HMAS Coonawarra in Darwin, Northern Territory, with the remaining patrol boats and the hydrographic fleet located at HMAS Cairns in Cairns. The Fleet Air Arm is based at HMAS Albatross near Nowra, New South Wales.

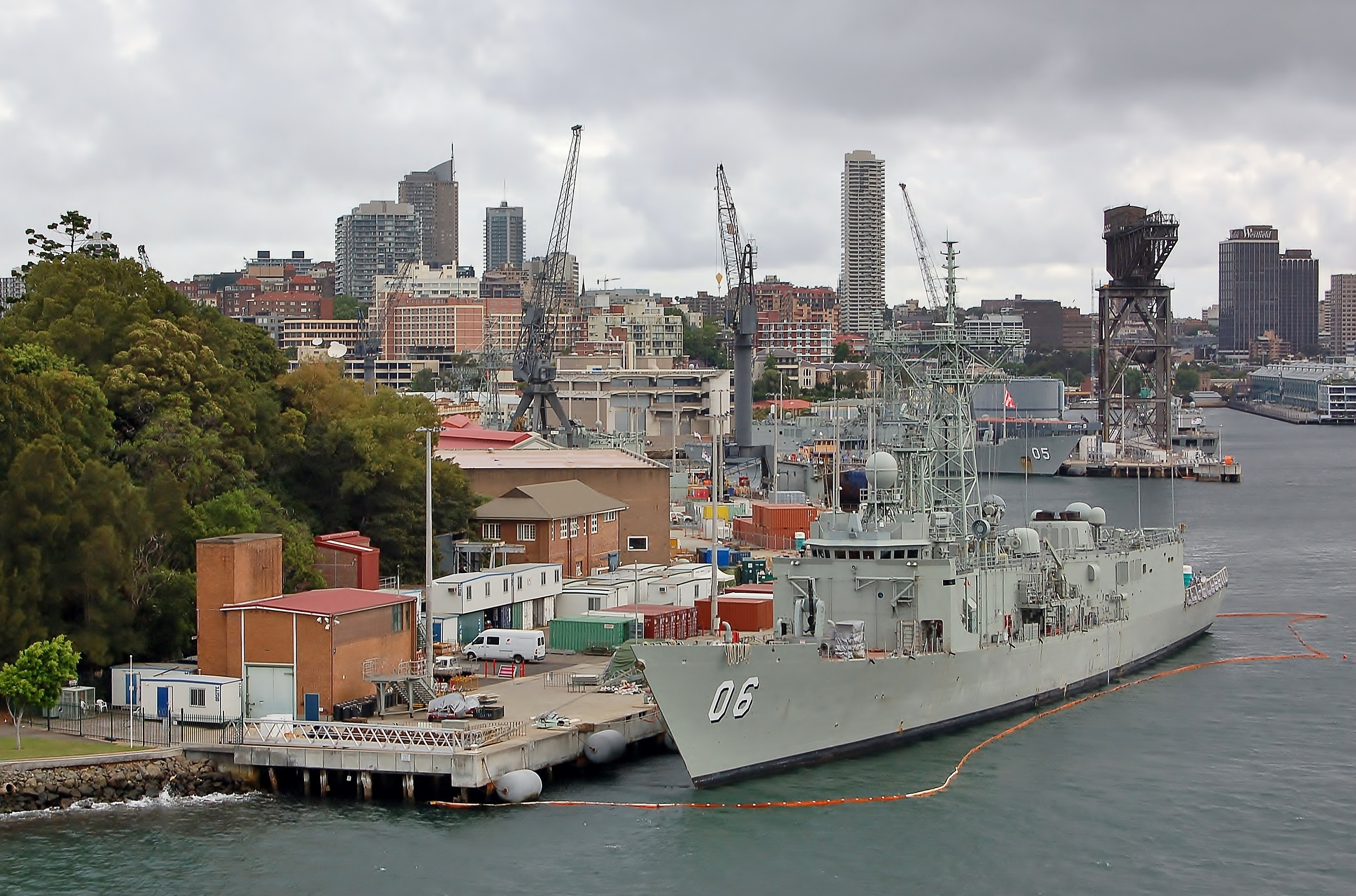
Adelaide class frigates HMAS Newcastle and HMAS Melbourne moored at Fleet Base East

The Australian Army's regular units are concentrated in a few bases, most of which are located in Australia's northern states. The Army's operational headquarters, Forces Command, is located at Victoria Barracks in Sydney. Most elements of the Army's three regular brigades are based at Robertson Barracks near Darwin, Lavarack Barracks in Townsville, Queensland, and Gallipoli Barracks in Brisbane. The 1st Division's Headquarters is also located at Gallipoli Barracks. Other important Army bases include the Army Aviation Centre near Oakey, Queensland, Holsworthy Barracks near Sydney, Woodside Barracks near Adelaide, South Australia, and Campbell Barracks in Perth. Dozens of Army Reserve depots are located across Australia.

The Royal Australian Air Force maintains several air bases, including three which are only occasionally activated. The RAAF's operational headquarters, Air Command, is located at RAAF Base Glenbrook near Sydney. The Air Force's combat aircraft are based at RAAF Base Amberley near Ipswich, Queensland, RAAF Base Tindal near Katherine, Northern Territory, and RAAF Base Williamtown near Newcastle, New South Wales. The RAAF's maritime patrol aircraft are based at RAAF Base Edinburgh near Adelaide and most of its transport aircraft are based at RAAF Base Richmond in Sydney. RAAF Base Edinburgh is also home to the control centre for the Jindalee Operational Radar Network. Most of the RAAF's training aircraft are based at RAAF Base Pearce near Perth with the remaining aircraft located at RAAF Base East Sale near Sale, Victoria, and RAAF Base Williamtown. The RAAF also maintains a network of bases in northern Australia to support operations to Australia's north. These bases include RAAF Base Darwin and RAAF Base Townsville and three 'bare bases' in Queensland and Western Australia. Of the RAAF's operational bases, only Tindal is located near an area in which the service's aircraft might feasibly see combat. While this protects the majority of the RAAF's assets from air attack, most air bases are poorly defended and aircraft are generally hangared in un-hardened shelters.

In 2026, it was announced that up to 67 military properties will be sold following a review of all bases and properties across Australia.

The Guardian reported in September 2026 that the US military controls 17 Australian defence facilities and has access to 75 other Australian-run military bases. US defence corporations have access to a further 18 Australian defence facilities.

== Legal standing ==
Section 51(vi) of the Australian Constitution gives the Australian Parliament the power to make laws regarding Australia's defence and defence forces and section 114 prevents the states from raising armed forces without the permission of the Commonwealth. Under section 119 the Commonwealth is assigned responsibility for defending Australia from invasion.

Section 68 of the Constitution states that the governor-general is the commander-in-chief of the ADF. In practical terms, this power is largely ceremonial. The governor-general may only exercise this power on the advice from the prime minister, other ministers or through the Federal Executive Council. The elected government also controls the ADF through the minister for Defence, who has the power under section 8 of the Defence Act 1903 over the "general control and administration of the Defence Force" and may make directions to the chief of Defence Force that must be complied with.

For practical purposes, the decision to commit the ADF to armed conflict is a decision of the elected government, made by the prime minister following deliberations of the National Security Committee of Cabinet (NSC). The NSC may refer its decision to the full Cabinet for its endorsement. However, the precise legal mechanism for the exercise of this war-making power is unclear. (Note: It is largely accepted that the power to go to war is a prerogative power falling under section 61 of the Constitution. While the use of the ADF for internal security is largely governed by statute, the external deployment power has not been codified. In particular, it is disputed whether this external power may be validly exercised without the involvement of the governor-general, which has been the contemporary practice at least since the Gulf War. Alternatively, it is possible that forces can be committed using ministerial powers granted under section 8 of the Defence Act 1903.) The Commonwealth Government has never been required by the Constitution or legislation to seek parliamentary approval for decisions to deploy military forces overseas or go to war.

== Domestic responsibilities ==
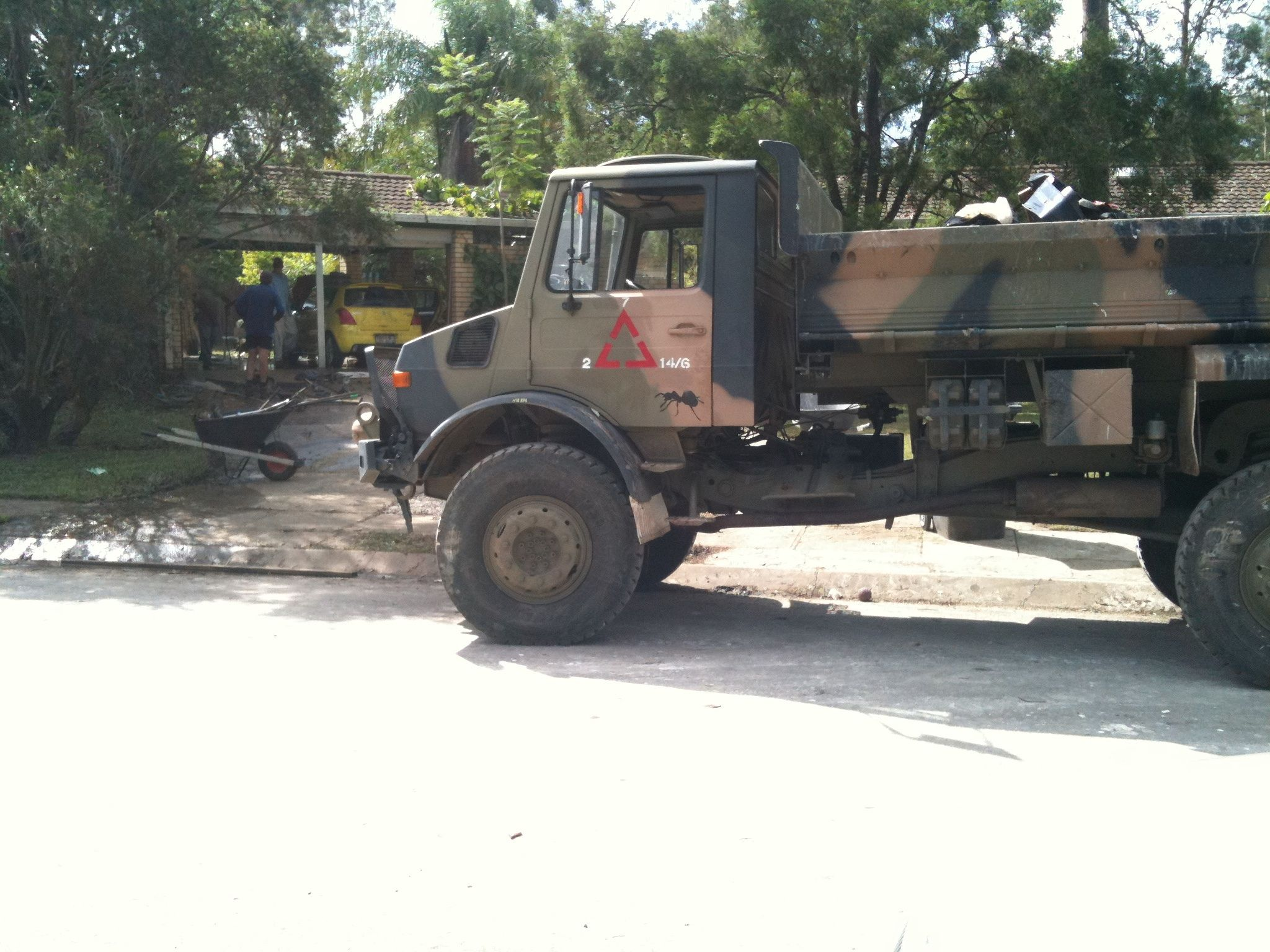
An Army truck being used to clean up damage caused by flooding in Brisbane during Operation Queensland Flood Assist in 2011

In addition to its military role, the ADF contributes to domestic security as well as disaster relief efforts in Australia and overseas. These functions are primarily the responsibility of civilian agencies, and the ADF's role in them requires specific justification and authorisation.

Elements of the ADF are frequently called out to contribute to relief efforts following natural disasters in Australia or overseas. The ADF's role in these efforts is set out in Australia's emergency management plans. The ADF typically contributes specialist capabilities, such as engineers or transport, to support the civil authorities. For major disasters, this can involve a large-scale deployment of personnel and assets. While the ADF has a commitment to assist relief efforts, several defence white papers have specified that this is a secondary responsibility to the force's focus on maintaining combat capabilities. As a result, requests for assistance have to be balanced against military priorities. No elements of the ADF are specifically tasked with or equipped for disaster relief efforts.

The ADF can also be tasked with providing aid to civil authorities outside of natural disasters; for instance in response to industrial action or to assist civilian police maintain law and order. This rarely occurs, however, and most Australians consider the use of military personnel to break strikes or undertake law enforcement to be inappropriate. Due to the political sensitivities associated with strike breaking, the ADF conducts little planning or other preparations for this role and the Defence Act explicitly states that reservists may not be called out or deployed in response to industrial action.

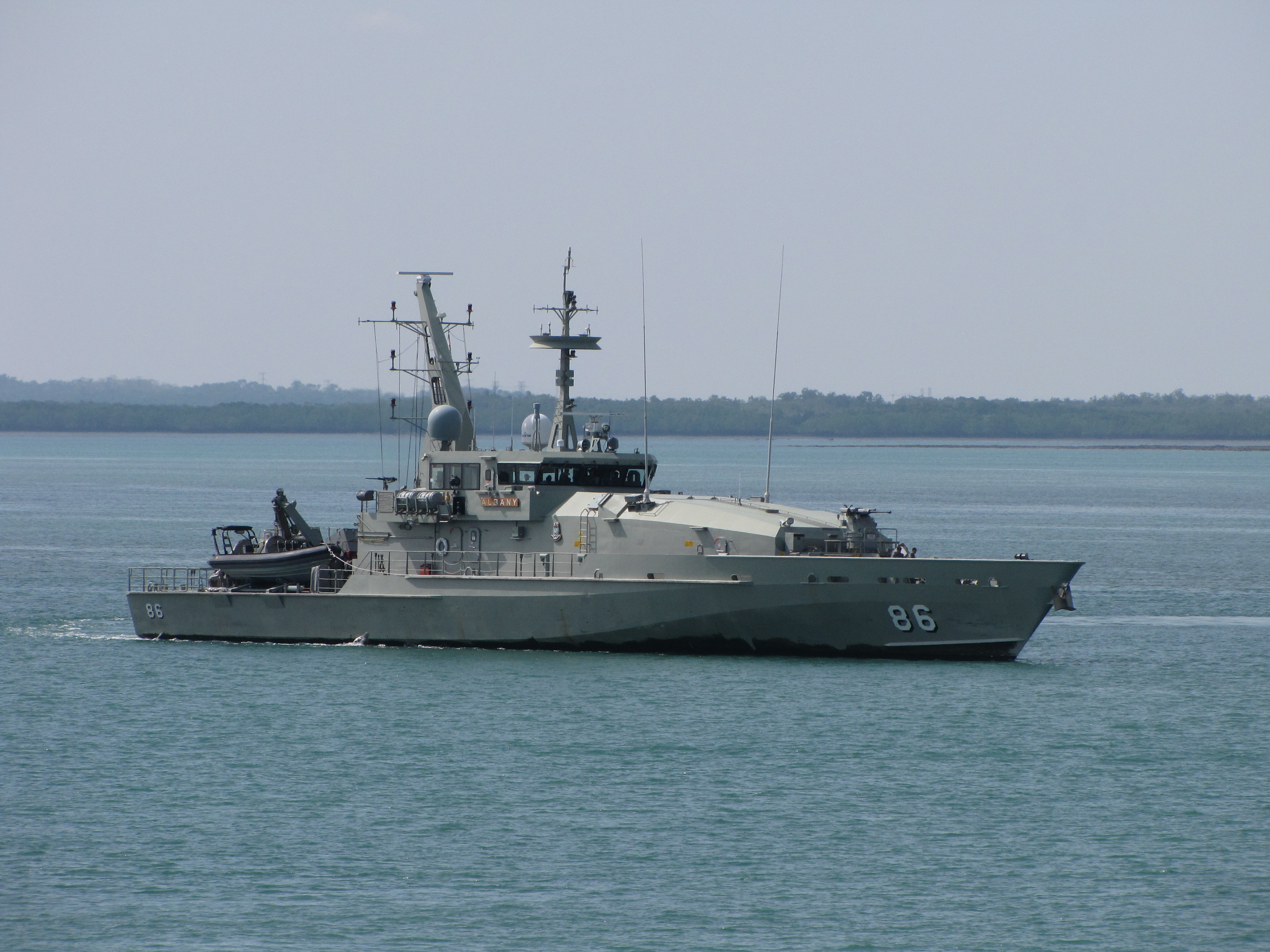
The Navy's Armidale class patrol boats (HMAS Albany pictured) are mainly used for border and fisheries patrol tasks

Over recent years, the ADF has been frequently committed to disaster relief. This has included deployments of large numbers of personnel to support fire fighting efforts during the 2019–20 Australian bushfire season and to assist state police and healthcare services during the COVID-19 pandemic. The scale of these deployments and the disruption they have caused to military training has led to suggestions that either elements of the Army Reserve be dedicated to disaster relief or a separate civilian organisation be established to take on the duties the ADF is undertaking.

The ADF makes a significant contribution to Australia's domestic maritime security. ADF ships, aircraft and Regional Force Surveillance Units conduct patrols of northern Australia in conjunction with the Australian Border Force (ABF). This operation, which is code-named Operation Resolute, is commanded by the Maritime Border Command which is jointly manned by members of the ADF and ABF. This operation involves a considerable proportion of the ADF's assets, with the forces assigned typically including two major naval vessels, multiple patrol boats, Regional Force Surveillance Unit patrols and AP-3 Orion aircraft. The ADF also often contributes to search and rescue efforts coordinated by the Australian Maritime Safety Authority and other civilian agencies.

While the ADF does not have a significant nation-building role, it provides assistance to remote Indigenous Australian communities through the Army Aboriginal Community Assistance Program. Under this program, which has been conducted since 1997, an engineer squadron works with one community for several months each year to upgrade local infrastructure and provide training. The ADF also took part in the intervention in remote Northern Territory Indigenous communities between June 2007 and October 2008. During this operation more than 600 ADF personnel provided logistical support to the Northern Territory Emergency Response Task Force and helped conduct child health checks.

The ADF shares responsibility for counter-terrorism with civilian law enforcement agencies. Under Australia's Counter-Terrorism Strategy, the state and territory police and emergency services have the primary responsibility for responding to any terrorist incidents on Australian territory. If a terrorist threat or the consequences of an incident are beyond the capacity of civilian authorities to resolve, the ADF may be called out to provide support following a request from the relevant state or territory government. The Commonwealth Government has responsibility for responding to offshore terrorist incidents. ADF liaison officers are posted to civilian law enforcement agencies, and the military offers specialised training to police counter-terrorism teams. To meet its counter-terrorism responsibilities the ADF maintains two elite Tactical Assault Groups, the Special Operations Engineer Regiment as well as a company-sized high readiness group in each Army Reserve brigade and the 1st Commando Regiment. ADF intelligence assets also work with other Australian Government and police agencies to counter foreign terrorist threats. While these forces provide a substantial counter-terrorism capability, the ADF does not regard domestic security as being part of its "core business".

== Foreign defence relations ==
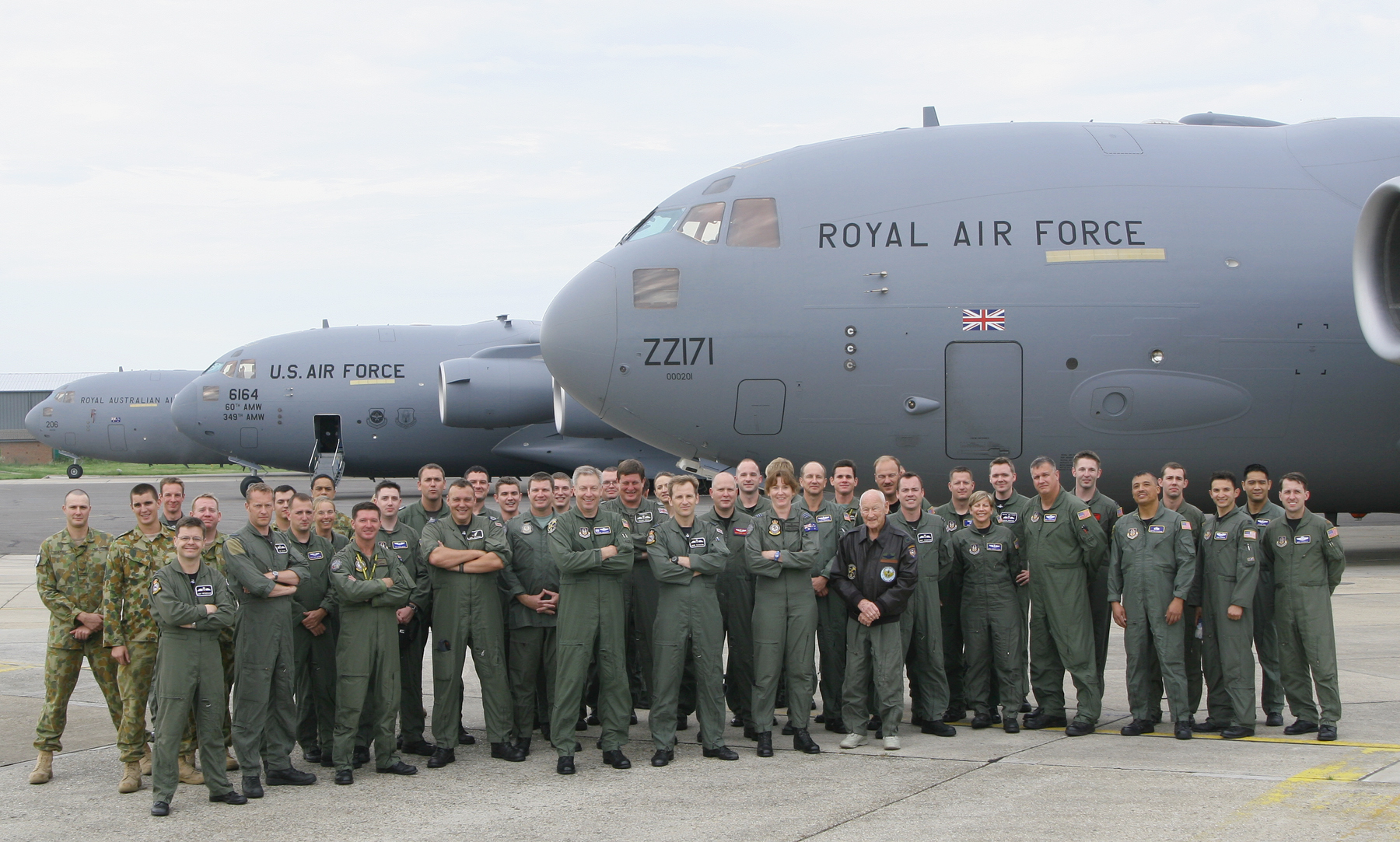
Australian, British and United States C-17 Globemasters and aircrew in Britain during 2007

The Australian Defence Force cooperates with militaries around the world. Australia's formal military agreements include the ANZUS Alliance with the United States, the Closer Defence Program with New Zealand, the Five Power Defence Arrangements with Malaysia, Singapore, New Zealand and the United Kingdom, and the ABCA Armies Standardisation Program with the United States, the United Kingdom, Canada and New Zealand. Australia has also established a partnership with NATO. ADF activities under these agreements include participating in joint planning, intelligence sharing, personnel exchanges, equipment standardisation programs and joint exercises. Australia is also a member of the UKUSA signals intelligence gathering agreement. Members of the ADF are posted to Australian diplomatic missions around the world as defence attachés; in 2016 the role of these officers was expanded to include promoting export sales for the Australian defence industry. The 2016 Defence White Paper stated that the Government will seek to further expand the ADF's international engagement.

Singapore and the United States maintain military units in Australia. Two Republic of Singapore Air Force pilot training squadrons with a total of 230 personnel are based in Australia. The Singapore Armed Forces also uses the Shoalwater Bay Military Training Area in Queensland for large-scale exercises; under the terms of a bilateral agreement, these run for up to 18 weeks each year and involve as many as 14,000 Singaporean personnel.

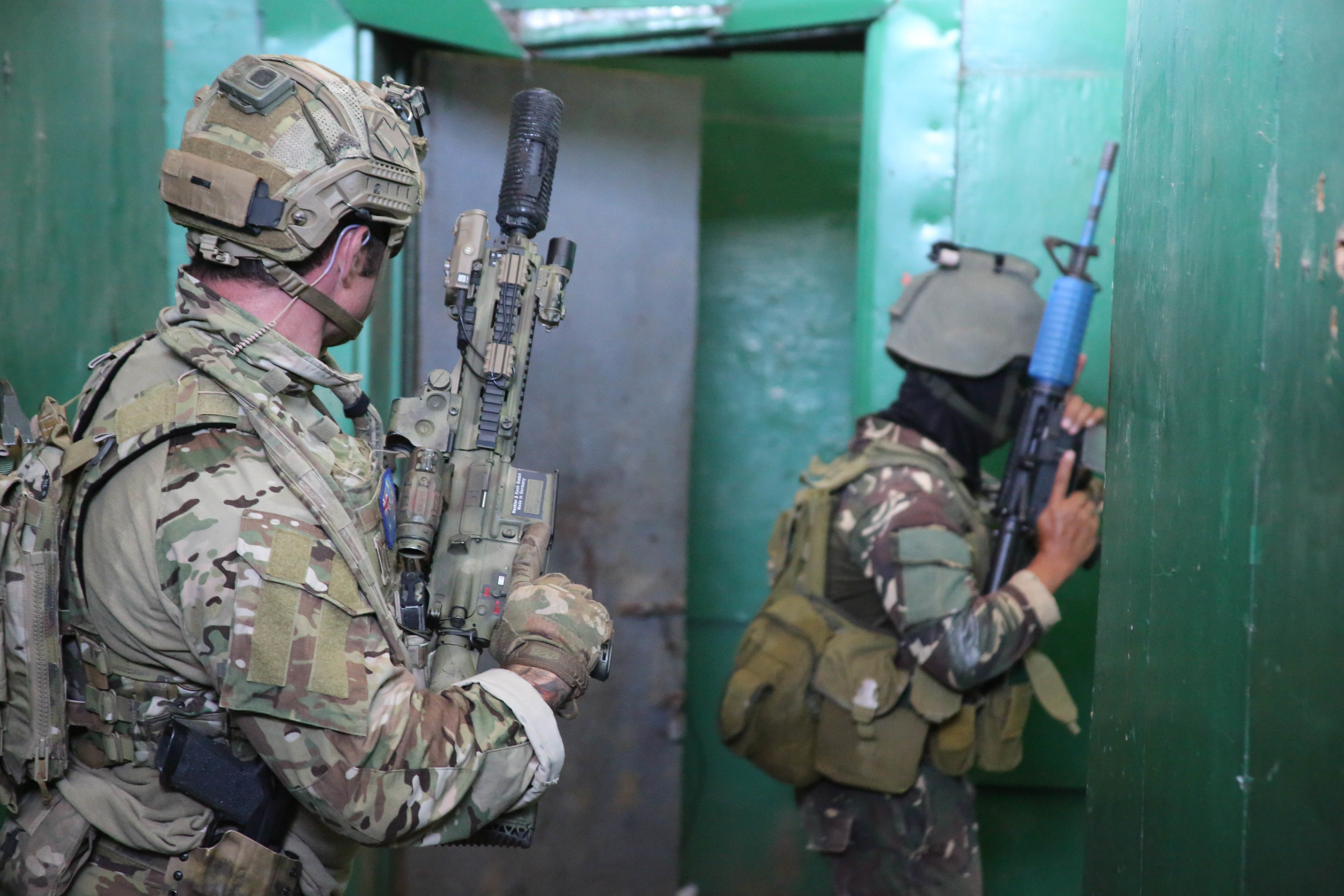
An Australian commando (at left) training with a Filipino soldier in 2017

The United States maintains intelligence and communications facilities in Australia which are staffed by 1,700 personnel. The intelligence facilities comprise the Pine Gap satellite tracking station near Alice Springs and Naval Communication Station Harold E. Holt near Exmouth, Western Australia. Pine Gap is jointly operated by Australian and United States personnel and Naval Communication Station Harold E. Holt has been an exclusively Australian-operated facility since 1999. In early 2007 the Australian Government approved the construction of a new US communications installation at the Defence Signals Directorate Australian Defence Satellite Communications Station facility near Geraldton, Western Australia, to provide a ground station for the US-led Wideband Global System which Australia is partly funding. The United States Military also frequently uses Australian exercise areas and these facilities have been upgraded to support joint Australian-United States training. In November 2011, the Australian and American Governments announced plans to base on rotational basis a United States Marine Corps Marine Air-Ground Task Force in the Northern Territory for training and exercise purposes and increase rotations of United States Air Force (USAF) aircraft through northern Australia. As part of this agreement, the Marine Rotational Force – Darwin has been deployed to Australia for six months each year since 2012. It is planned for this force to eventually comprise around 2,500 personnel with supporting aircraft and equipment. The expanded rotations of USAF units to Australia began in early 2017.

The ADF provides assistance to militaries in Australia's region through the Defence Cooperation Program. Under this program the ADF provides assistance with training, infrastructure, equipment and logistics and participates in joint exercises with countries in South East Asia and Oceania. The Pacific Patrol Boat Program is the largest Defence Cooperation Program activity and supports 22 Pacific class patrol boats operated by twelve South Pacific countries. Other important activities include supporting the development of the Timor Leste Defence Force and Papua New Guinea Defence Force and supplying watercraft to the Armed Forces of the Philippines. Australia also directly contributes to the defence of Pacific countries by periodically deploying warships and aircraft to patrol their territorial waters; this includes an annual deployment of RAAF AP-3 Orions to the region as part of a multi-national maritime surveillance operation. Under an informal agreement Australia is responsible for the defence of Nauru.

Since the signing of the Japan-Australia Acquisition and Cross-Servicing Agreement, the Joint Declaration on Security Cooperation between Japan and Australia, and the Reciprocal Access Agreement between Japan and Australia, the Australian Defence Force has been working closely with the Japan Self-Defense Forces on various joint operations, training exercises, and strategic initiatives. These agreements have significantly enhanced bilateral defence cooperation, improving interoperability, mutual support, and coordination in regional security matters.

== See also ==
- List of military equipment of Australia
- Defence Space Command
- ADF, Medical Class Classifications
