= Force structure =

A force structure is the combat-capable part of a military organisation which describes how military personnel, and their weapons and equipment, are organised for the operations, missions and tasks expected from them by the particular doctrine of the service or demanded by the environment of the conflict.

Force structuring considers the allocation of officers and other service men and women, their skills, and the relationship between their military units required to provide mutual support during military operations as a military capability of the armed forces in part or as a whole. The totality of the force structure committed to any given military operation, mission or task is called an order of battle.

Another important part of the force structure planning is how the command structure is organised within the order of battle will not reflect the force structure, but the forces command hierarchy and their relative deployment within the Theatre of Military Operations, during operational manoeuvre, or in the Tactical Area of Responsibility.

The adaptability of any force's force structure is usually tested in wartime to reflect changing nature of warfare, and therefore military doctrine, it usually entails for the participants. Force structure is also often shaped by forces of necessity when there is a lack of trained personnel, experience or appropriate equipment. David Glantz in his When Titans Clash provides an example of how the Red Army after three years of retreats, massive losses, steep learning curves, maturation and regaining the initiative identified this process of change in force structure by The 1944 Field Regulations of the Red Army, or Ustav, formalised their experiences of 1943, including the artillery and the air offensives for the ground forces. Importantly, the 1944 Ustav "stressed the importance of maneuver, surprise, and initiative, three hallmarks of interwar German and Soviet theory". This reflected a continuation of the a steady growth in mechanised force structure pursued by the Red Army since the 1930s, and when "Khalkhin-Gol demonstrated the viability of Soviet theory and force structure".

Currently changes in force structure can be caused not only by changes in forms of warfare and doctrine, but also rapid change in technology and budgetary considerations based on the wider national economy.
