= Military art (military science) =

Process in which arts take military

Military art (French: L'Art de la Guerre; lit. art of war) is a field of theoretical research and training methodology in military science used in the conduct of military operations on land, in the maritime or air environments. Military art includes the study and application of the principles of warfare and laws of war that apply equally to the closely interrelated military strategy, operational art and tactics. Exercise of military art is highly dependent on the economics and logistics supporting the armed forces, their military technology and equipment, and reflects the social influences on the military organisation exercising military art. Often misunderstood due to its 19th-century perception as generally "including the entire subject of war", it is primarily, as the term implies, the expression of creative thinking on the part of the decision-makers in employing their forces, with the map of the area of operations as a veritable canvas, and the movement of forces commonly marked on the map with arrows, as brush strokes. Less imaginatively it was defined in France during the 19th century as

The art of war is the art of concentrating and employing, at the opportune moment, a superior force of troops upon the decisive point.

and

The art of divining the intention of the enemy from slight indications is one which rarely misleads, and is one of the most precious attributes of military genius.

It is not well known that many of the greatest military leaders in Europe and Asia, notably Japan, were themselves either accomplished artists, or collectors of art.

== History ==
In history, schools of thinking about military art can be divided during the ancient and medieval periods by the influence of infantry troops on tactics in Europe, and cavalry on tactics in Asia, and the period commencing with the Early Modern period when firearms and artillery increasingly influenced employment of forces. The need for mobility, opportunity and decisiveness have tended to associate military art with offensive manoeuvre, cavalry, and therefore, before advent of late-19th century firearms, Asia.

In Europe military art was primarily concerned with time of combat, understanding the best way an occupied position can enhance defensive potential of a small field army largely consisting of relatively low mobility troops, by often using high ground, terrain choke points or field entrenchments. Due to relative lack of economic and logistic support, European military art theorists advocated decisive battles that could bring a military campaign to a quick conclusion, thus reducing the economic cost of war, notably through the shock tactics of the armoured cavalry. In Asia, due to a more developed and widespread horse breeding offering enhanced mobility, military art developed a more offensive-based way of thinking about military tactics, and military art was dominated by considerations of choosing point of attack and military communications.

The confrontation between these two forms of military art that took place as a result of the Crusades and the Mongol invasion of Europe, and the contemporaneous introduction of artillery into warfare significantly changed thinking about military art in Europe, leading to wide-ranging experiments in tactical formation of troops, use of combined arms and exercise of maneuver warfare concepts and methods not only in tactics, but on a larger scale, including in use of naval forces. This later led to creation of European colonial empires.

Although European military art on land can be argued not to have reached its developed stage until the 19th century in the attempt to defeat linear tactics that led to the First World War, and ultimate sophistication during the Second World War and the Cold War, great increases in the firepower of the European firearms and artillery were usually able to negate greater number and mobility of the Asian field forces, no-where more illustrated than during the French Invasion of Egypt in 1798. The defining application of firepower and manoeuvre in military art became expressed during the conduct of strategic operations of the Red Army in World War II that sought to combine the shock of armoured warfare with mobility, and the traditional reliance on infantry in strengthened positions to first stop the German advances and during counter-attacks to achieve breakthrough of the enemy position, and in conducting deep operations to destroy the logistic support, literally starving German troops of supplies and ammunition, and forcing them to surrender.

Military art in naval warfare likewise developed along the considerations of position versus speed, initially through use of galleys and later during the Age of Sail. However, increasingly naval tactics became dominated by the relative firepower of individual vessels, and this was demonstrated during the epic Battle of Trafalgar. The use of naval forces in military art significantly expanded the scale of conflicts to global ranges. For much of the 19th and 20th centuries naval military art became concerned primarily with the firepower and the ability of ships to withstand it through use of increasing their armour until the introduction of naval aviation into consideration of naval battles and naval strategy.

Introduction of aircraft into warfare drastically altered the 19th century understanding of military art, and application of its principles. Aerial warfare became the ultimate solution to manoeuvre in delivery of firepower, and drastically increased the tempo of conflicts, making blitzkrieg possible during the Second World War. Aerial warfare also finally negated the advantage of a defensive position which left the defender as an easily detected and attacked target for the bombers. While German industrial centres became just such targets for the Allied strategic bombing during World War II, on the Eastern Front the Soviet Red Army chose to adapt by developing concepts and methods suggested by theorists during the interwar period to a more offensive-based and dynamic conduct of operations coordinating ground and air offensives.

The final development in military art came with the increased influence of the electronics and its implications for the ability by infantry to halt the breakthroughs using increasingly powerful infantry support weapons, and the effect on the military communications by a new form of combat, electronic warfare. The potential of losing ability to exercise command and control over forces, particularly strategically significant forces, completely undermined much of the theoretical thinking of the Cold War. Some have argued that this was one of the factors, along with those of economic considerations, that eventually led to the Treaty on Conventional Armed Forces in Europe, and Dissolution of the USSR.

Since the end of the Cold War in Europe, application of military art has been sought primarily by conventional forces in combat operations against unconventional opponents, and this has many attempts to review military history in the effort to find solutions to successful conduct of operations against these forces.
