= Principles of war =

Rules and guidelines of military operations

Principles of war are rules and guidelines that represent truths in the practice of war and military operations.

The earliest known principles of war were documented by Sun Tzu, c. 500 BCE, as well as Chanakya in his Arthashastra c. 350 BCE. Machiavelli published his "General Rules" in 1521 which were themselves modeled on Vegetius' Regulae bellorum generales (Epit. 3.26.1–33). Henri, Duke of Rohan established his "Guides" for war in 1644. Marquis de Silva presented his "Principles" for war in 1778. Henry Lloyd proffered his version of "Rules" for war in 1781 as well as his "Axioms" for war in 1781. Then in 1805, Antoine-Henri Jomini published his "Maxims" for war version 1, "Didactic Resume" and "Maxims" for war version 2. Carl von Clausewitz wrote his version in 1812 building on the work of earlier writers.

There are no universally agreed-upon principles of war. The principles of warfare are tied into military doctrine of the various military services. Doctrine, in turn, suggests but does not dictate strategy and tactics.

== Historical principles ==
=== Arthashastra ===
Arthaśāstra is an ancient Indian Sanskrit treatise on statecraft and military strategy among other things.

=== Biblical ===
The Book of Deuteronomy prescribes how the Israelite army was to fight, including dealing with plunder, enslavement of the enemy women and children and forbidding the destruction of fruit-bearing trees.

=== Sun Tzu ===
Sun Tzu's The Art of War, written c. 400 BCE, listed five basic factors for a commander to consider:

- The Moral Law, or discipline and unity of command
- Heaven, or weather factors
- Earth, or the terrain
- The Commander
- Method and discipline, which included logistics and supply

However, Sun Tzu implied individual initiative as a principle of warfare, stating "According as circumstances are favorable, one should modify one's plans."

=== Napoleon Bonaparte ===
Since the first appearance in English of the military maxims of Napoleon Bonaparte in 1831, all English translations have relied upon the extremely incomplete French edition of General Burnod (Note: The third edition of Barbier's Dictionnaire des ouvrages anonymes notes the publication: "Maximes de guerre de Napoleon (avec notes de Burnod, aide de camp de l'empereur de Russie). Paris, Anselin, 1827 [...].") published in 1827. This has contributed to the erroneous belief that Napoléon Bonaparte had pioneered the "Principles of War". Napoléon was a keen follower of famous military generals of the past, who influenced his thoughts greatly. Albeit, "The armies of today are based on the organization created by Napoleon [sic] for his Grand Army and it has been used ever since." (Weider, par. 12). Since the mid-19th century, due to the influence of the Prussian army, the maxims have become a guide for many military organizations to focus the thinking of military commanders and political leaders toward concepts and methods of successful prosecution of wars and smaller military operations. Although originally concerned with strategy, grand strategy and tactics, due to the changing nature of warfare and military technology, since the interwar period, the principles are largely applied to the strategic decision-making, and in some cases, to operational mobility of forces.

=== Carl von Clausewitz ===
The principles of war identified by Carl von Clausewitz in his essay Principles of War (1812), and later enlarged in his book, On War, have been influential in military thinking in the North Atlantic region.

The initial essay dealt with the tactics of combat, and suggested the following general principles:

- discover how we may gain a preponderance of physical forces and material advantages at the decisive point
- to calculate moral factors
- make the best use of the few means at our disposal
- never lack calmness and firmness; without this firm resolution, no great results can be achieved in the most successful war
- always have the choice between the most audacious and the most careful solution; no military leader has ever become great without audacity

Based on the above, Clausewitz went on to suggest principles for tactics, the scale of combat that dominated European warfare at the time:

- The defence
- The offense
- The use of troops
- The use of terrain
- Forces are more effective in a concentric rather than in a parallel attack; attack concentrically without having decisive superiority in an engagement
- Always seek to envelop that part of the enemy against which we direct our main attack
- Cut off the enemy from his line of retreat

Clausewitz also included in the essay general principles of strategy by saying that warfare has three main objects:

1. To conquer and destroy the armed power of the enemy; always direct our principal operation against the main body of the enemy army or at least against an important portion of his forces
2. To take possession of his material and other sources of strength, and to direct our operations against the places where most of these resources are concentrated
3. To gain public opinion, won through great victories and the occupation of the enemy's capital

=== Jomini ===
Antoine Henri Jomini in his book, Precis de l'Art de Guerre, published in 1838, also developed theories of warfare based on the concepts and methods used during the Napoleonic Wars.

=== Ardant du Picq ===
Colonel Ardant du Picq, a French infantry officer who was killed in the Franco-Prussian War, prepared drafts based on his observations of military history which became the book Battle Studies. In it two of Du Picq's observations stand out:

- Combat is the object, the cause of being, and the supreme manifestation of an army and must be the focus of training, even in peacetime.
- The human element is more important than theories. War is still more of an art than a science.

=== 20th century theory ===
Applied to specific forms of warfare, such as naval warfare, Julian Corbett argued that maritime strategy should play a significant role in the principles of war. Admiral William S. Sims, who commanded the U.S. Navy's contribution to the British Grand Fleet in World War I, wrote of the U.S. Naval War College:

The college aims to supply principles, not rules, and by training, develop the habit of applying these principles logically, correctly, and rapidly to each situation that may arise.

This habit can be acquired only through considerable practice, hence the numerous problems in strategy and tactics.

== National principles of war ==
Variations exist and differences are minor and semantic or reflect a cultural persuasion for a particular approach. A closer examination of the values and culture of origin reveals its war priorities.

=== UK ===
The UK uses 10 principles of war, as taught to all officers of the Royal Navy, British Army, and Royal Air Force:

The British Army's principles of war were first published after the First World War and based on the work of the British general and military theorist, J. F. C. Fuller. The definition of each principle has been refined over the following decades and adopted throughout the British armed forces. The tenth principle, added later, was originally called Administration. The first principle has always been stated as pre-eminent and the second is usually considered more important than the remainder, which are not listed in any order of importance.

The 2011 edition of British Defence Doctrine (BDD) states and explains the principles with the following preface: "Principles of War guide commanders and their staffs in the planning and conduct of warfare. They are enduring, but not immutable, absolute or prescriptive, and provide an appropriate foundation for all military activity. The relative importance of each may vary according to context; their application requires judgement, common sense and intelligent interpretation. Commanders also need to take into account the legitimacy of their actions, based on the legal, moral, political, diplomatic and ethical propriety of the conduct of military forces, once committed."

The ten principles as listed and defined in the 2011 edition, unchanged from the 2008 edition, of BDD (which also provides explanation) are:

- Selection and Maintenance of the Aim – A single, unambiguous aim is the keystone of successful military operations. Selection and maintenance of the aim is regarded as the master principle of war.
- Maintenance of Morale – Morale is a positive state of mind derived from inspired political and military leadership, a shared sense of purpose and values, well-being, perceptions of worth and group cohesion.
- Offensive Action – Offensive action is the practical way in which a commander seeks to gain advantage, sustain momentum and seize the initiative.
- Security – Security is the provision and maintenance of an operating environment that affords the necessary freedom of action, when and where required, to achieve objectives.
- Surprise – Surprise is the consequence of shock and confusion induced by the deliberate or incidental introduction of the unexpected.
- Concentration of Force – Concentration of force involves the decisive, synchronized application of superior fighting power (conceptual, physical, and moral) to realize intended effects, when and where required.
- Economy of Effort – Economy of effort is the judicious exploitation of manpower, materiel and time in relation to the achievement of objectives.
- Flexibility – the ability to change readily to meet new circumstances – comprises agility, responsiveness, resilience, acuity and adaptability.
- Cooperation – Cooperation entails the incorporation of teamwork and a sharing of dangers, burdens, risks and opportunities in every aspect of warfare.
- Sustainability – To sustain a force is to generate the means by which its fighting power and freedom of action are maintained.

These principles of war are commonly used by the armed forces of Commonwealth countries such as Australia.

=== Soviet Union and Russia ===
Soviet adoption of the principles of war is considered a part of military art, and is therefore a system of knowledge that is

the theory and practice of preparing and conducting military operations on the land, at sea, and in the air.

As such it includes the following principles

- High combat readiness
- surprise, decisiveness and active seeking to secure the initiative
- full use of all means of combat
- coordination and interaction of all types and branches
- decisive concentration
- simultaneous attack in depth
- full use of morale-political factor
- firm and continuous command and control
- inexorability and decisiveness during the mission
- security of combat operations
- timely restoration of troop combat readiness

The Soviet principles of military science, from Soviet AirLand Battle Tactics ISBN 0-89141-160-7. Similar principles continue to be followed in CIS countries.

- Preparedness – The ability to fulfill missions under any conditions for starting or the conduct of war.
- Initiative – Utilizing surprise, decisiveness, and aggressiveness to continuously strive to achieve and retain the initiative. Initiative, in this sense describes efforts to fulfill the plan in spite of difficulties. This is in contrast to the western usage of the term which means attacking (or threatening to attack) to force enemy reaction, thus denying his ability to act.
- Capability – Full use of the various means and capabilities of battle to achieve victory.
- Cooperation – Coordinated application of and close cooperation between major units of the armed forces.
- Concentration – Decisive concentration of the essential force at the needed moment and in the most important direction to achieve the main mission.
- Depth – Destruction of the enemy throughout the entire depth of their deployment.
- Morale – Use of political and psychological factors to demoralize opponents and break their will to resist.
- Obedience – Strict and uninterrupted obedience. Orders are to be followed exactly and without question. Commanders are expected to directly supervise subordinates in a detailed manner in order to ensure compliance.
- Steadfastness – Subordinate commanders are to carry out the spirit and the letter of the plan.
- Security – Security complements surprise. All aspects of security, from deception and secrecy, to severe discipline of subordinates who through action or inaction allow information to fall into the hands of ourselves are to be vigorously carried out.
- Logistics – Restoration of reserves and restoration of combat capability is of paramount concern of the modern, fast paced battlefield.

Thus it can be seen that in Military art, the Soviet and Western systems are similar, but place their emphasis in wildly differing places. Western systems allow more control and decision-making at lower levels of command, and with this empowerment comes a consistent emphasis. Offensive, mass, and maneuver principles for the western commander all place a sense of personal responsibility and authority to ensure these principles are followed by appropriate action. In contrast the Soviet system stresses preparedness, initiative, and obedience. This places more responsibility at the better prepared and informed centers of command, and provide more overall control of the battle.

=== United States ===
(Refer to US Army Field Manual FM 3–0)

The United States Armed Forces use the following nine principles of war:

- Objective – Direct every military operation toward a clearly defined, decisive and attainable objective. The ultimate military purpose of war is the destruction of the enemy's ability to fight and will to fight.
- Offensive – Seize, retain, and exploit the initiative. Offensive action is the most effective and decisive way to attain a clearly defined common objective. Offensive operations are the means by which a military force seizes and holds the initiative while maintaining freedom of action and achieving decisive results. This is fundamentally true across all levels of war.
- Mass – Mass the effects of overwhelming combat power at the decisive place and time. Synchronizing all the elements of combat power where they will have decisive effect on an enemy force in a short period of time is to achieve mass. Massing effects, rather than concentrating forces, can enable numerically inferior forces to achieve decisive results, while limiting exposure to enemy fire.
- Economy of Force – Employ all combat power available in the most effective way possible; allocate minimum essential combat power to secondary efforts. Economy of force is the judicious employment and distribution of forces. No part of the force should ever be left without purpose. The allocation of available combat power to such tasks as limited attacks, defense, delays, deception, or even retrograde operations is measured in order to achieve mass elsewhere at the decisive point and time on the battlefield.
- Maneuver – Place the enemy in a position of disadvantage through the flexible application of combat power. Maneuver is the movement of forces in relation to the enemy to gain positional advantage. Effective maneuver keeps the enemy off balance and protects the force. It is used to exploit successes, to preserve freedom of action, and to reduce vulnerability. It continually poses new problems for the enemy by rendering his actions ineffective, eventually leading to defeat.
- Unity of Command – For every objective, seek unity of command and unity of effort. At all levels of war, employment of military forces in a manner that masses combat power toward a common objective requires unity of command and unity of effort. Unity of command means that all the forces are under one responsible commander. It requires a single commander with the requisite authority to direct all forces in pursuit of a unified purpose.
- Security – Never permit the enemy to acquire unexpected advantage. Security enhances freedom of action by reducing vulnerability to hostile acts, influence, or surprise. Security results from the measures taken by a commander to protect his forces. Knowledge and understanding of enemy strategy, tactics, doctrine, and staff planning improve the detailed planning of adequate security measures.
- Surprise – Strike the enemy at a time or place or in a manner for which he is unprepared. Surprise can decisively shift the balance of combat power. By seeking surprise, forces can achieve success well out of proportion to the effort expended. Surprise can be in tempo, size of force, direction or location of main effort, and timing. Deception can aid the probability of achieving surprise.
- Simplicity – Prepare clear, uncomplicated plans and concise orders to ensure thorough understanding. Everything in war is very simple, but the simple thing is difficult. To the uninitiated, military operations are not difficult. Simplicity contributes to successful operations. Simple plans and clear, concise orders minimize misunderstanding and confusion. Other factors being equal, parsimony is to be preferred.

Officers in the U.S. Military sometimes use the acronyms "MOSS MOUSE", "MOOSE MUSS", "MOUSE MOSS", "MOM USE SOS", and "SUMO MOSES" to remember the first letters of these nine principles.

Comparisons
MOSSMOUSE	Equivalent Nine Principles
Mass	Concentration & Distribution
Objective	Direction
Simplicity	Not applicable. Simplicity was never listed as a principle by Fuller in his final draft.
Security	Security
Maneuver	Mobility
Offensive	Offensive Action (Disorganisation of Force)
Unity of Command	Determination & Endurance
Surprise	Surprise (Demoralisation of Force)
Economy of Force	Not applicable. Economy of Force was seen by Fuller as the goal of the Nine Principles, rather than a Principle in itself.

According to a United States Government document from 2010, the rule governing targeting in a non-international armed conflict is the international humanitarian law which is commonly known as the laws of war. The United States government stated in an undated Department of Justice White paper entitled "Lawfulness of a Lethal Operation Directed Against a U.S. Citizen who is a Senior Operational Leader of Al Qa’ida or An Associated Force" that the four fundamental law-of-war principles governing the use of force are necessity, distinction, proportionality and humanity i.e. the avoidance of unnecessary suffering.

There is a debate within the American military establishment to adopt flexibility as the tenth principle of war. Frost argues that the concept of flexibility should be integrated with America's warfighting doctrine. Americans soundly retort that flexibility is a given that pervades all aspects of each principle.

Many, however, hold that the principle of simplicity implicitly includes flexibility. One of the oldest dicta states that the simple plan is the flexible plan.

In 2007, Armed Forces Journal published a proposal by LCDR Chris van Avery, USN, 12 New Principles of War, to completely overhaul and expand the U.S. principles of war from nine to thirteen. The article was subsequently forwarded to the Joint Chiefs of Staff by Air Force Chief of Staff General Moseley and an effort to overhaul current U.S. doctrine was initiated using Van Avery's framework.

In 2011, three new "principles of joint operations" were added to the cited nine principles of war. These principles are:

- Restraint – to limit collateral damage and prevent the unnecessary use of force. Restraint requires the careful and disciplined balancing of the need for security, the conduct of military operations, and the national strategic end state.
- Perseverance – to ensure the commitment necessary to attain the national strategic end state. The underlying causes of the crisis may be elusive, making it difficult to achieve decisive resolution. The patient, resolute, and persistent pursuit of national goals and objectives often is essential to success.
- Legitimacy – to maintain legal and moral authority in the conduct of operations. Legitimacy, which can be a decisive factor in operations, is based on the actual and perceived legality, morality, and rightness of the actions from the various perspectives of interested audiences.

Together, these 12 concepts form the Principles of Joint Operations.

=== Canada ===
The Canadian Armed Forces principles of war/military science are defined by the Royal Military College of Canada or Canadian Forces College website to focus on principles of command, principles of war, operational art and campaign planning, and scientific principles.

- principles of command – Lead By Example; Know Your subordinates And Promote Their Welfare; Develop Leadership Potential; Make Sound And Timely Decisions; Train subordinates As A Team; Communicate Ideas Clearly; Keep subordinates Informed Of All Activities And New Developments; Take Initiatives; Know Yourself And Pursue Self-Improvement; Treat subordinates As You Wish To Be Treated
- principles of war – Selection and maintenance of the aim; maintenance of morale; offensive action; surprise; security; concentration of force; economy of effort; flexibility; co-operation; and administration. These principles are not listed in any order of importance.
- operational art and campaign planning – the organization and synchronization of the planning process and maritime, land and air forces.
- scientific principles – involved in military reconnaissance, surveillance, and target acquisition in the context of military operations.

=== France ===
The French Army recognizes three principles to be applied to operation of land forces at the tactical level:

- Freedom of action – "The ability of a commander to use his means at any time and to act despite the presence of the enemy and the various constraints imposed by both the environment and circumstances, in order to achieve the assigned goal. [...] Freedom of Action consists of maintaining the initiative with regards to the enemy in order to 'control upcoming action' and seize opportunities."
- Unity of effort – "Convergence in space and time of actions and effects of the different operational functions. [...] Unity of Effort distinguishes itself from the concentration of forces through the need to combine actions and optimize effects in order to increase the effectiveness on the chosen objective." This principle includes the psychological effects of surprise and troop morale, in addition to the more conventional principle of concentration of forces.
- Economy of means – "Proper distribution and use of assets in order to obtain the best ratio of capabilities vs. effects in order to achieve the assigned goal." The instruments for this principle are modularity, the "task organization" of the forces, and support.

According to French doctrine, new principles should be observed, primarily to protect the principle of "Freedom of Action":

- Legitimacy – Among the local population, in national public opinion, and among international institutions.
- Necessity – The appropriate amount of force is to be used for each desired objective.
- Reversibility – The military actor should be prepared to quickly change its course of action depending on the opponent's attitude. Organize military actions to limit human losses and material damages. Remain open to opportunities for de-escalation, and prepare to "support the failure of the enemy" rather than needlessly seeking total destruction. "[Keep] the operation’s level of intensity as low as possible."

=== Israel ===
The principles of war according to Israeli doctrine are:

- Maintenance of the aim;
- Morale;
- Initiative;
- Stratagem;
- Concentration of effort;
- Security;
- Optimal utilization of force;
- Continuity;
- Depth and reserve;
- Simplicity.

=== People's Republic of China ===
The military principles of war of the People's Liberation Army were loosely based on those of the Soviet Union until the 1980s when a significant shift begun to be seen in a more regionally-aware, and geographically-specific strategic, operational and tactical thinking in all services. The PLA is currently influenced by three doctrinal schools which both conflict and complement each other: the People's war, the Regional war, and the Revolution in military affairs that led to substantial increase in the defence spending and rate of technological modernisation of the forces.

- People's war – which is derived from the Maoist notion of warfare as a war in which the entire society is mobilized
- Regional war – which envisions future wars to be limited in scope and confined to the Chinese border
- Revolution in military affairs – which is a school of thought which believes that technology is transforming the basis of warfare and that these technological changes present both extreme dangers and possibilities for the Chinese military.

In recent years, 'Local war under high-tech conditions' has been promoted.

== Other uses ==
These principles can be applied to non-military uses when Unity of command is separated into coordination and reality, Economy of Force is redefined as use of resources, Mass is separated into renewable and non-renewable resources, and relationships are separated from unity of command.

In 1913 Harrington Emerson proposed 12 principles of efficiency, the first three of which could be related to principles of war: Clearly defined ideals – Objective, Common sense – Simplicity, Competent counsel – Unity of Command.

Some of the twelve non-military principles of efficiency were formulated by Henry Ford at the turn of the 20th century, and are suggested to be: objective, coordination, action, reality, knowledge, locations (space and time), things, obtaining, using, protecting, and losing. Nine, ten, or twelve principles all provide a framework for efficient development of any objective.

Principles of War was also a book published in 1969 for the Japan Self-Defense Forces. It outlines the basic military principles and strategies by which the Japanese army was to operate. The book was used for most military exams in Japan. The book backs up all military principles with historical examples.

== See also ==
- Geneva Conventions
- Grand strategy
- Hague Conventions
- Military doctrine
- Military strategy
- Military tactics
- Naval strategy
- Operational mobility
- Principles of sustainment
- Strategy
- U.S. Army Strategist
