= Counterattack =

Tactic employed in response to an attack

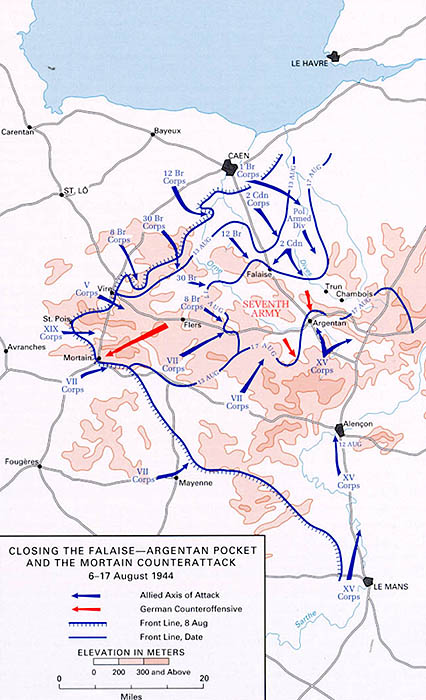
Closing the Falaise-Argentan Pocket and the Mortain counterattack 6–17 August 1944

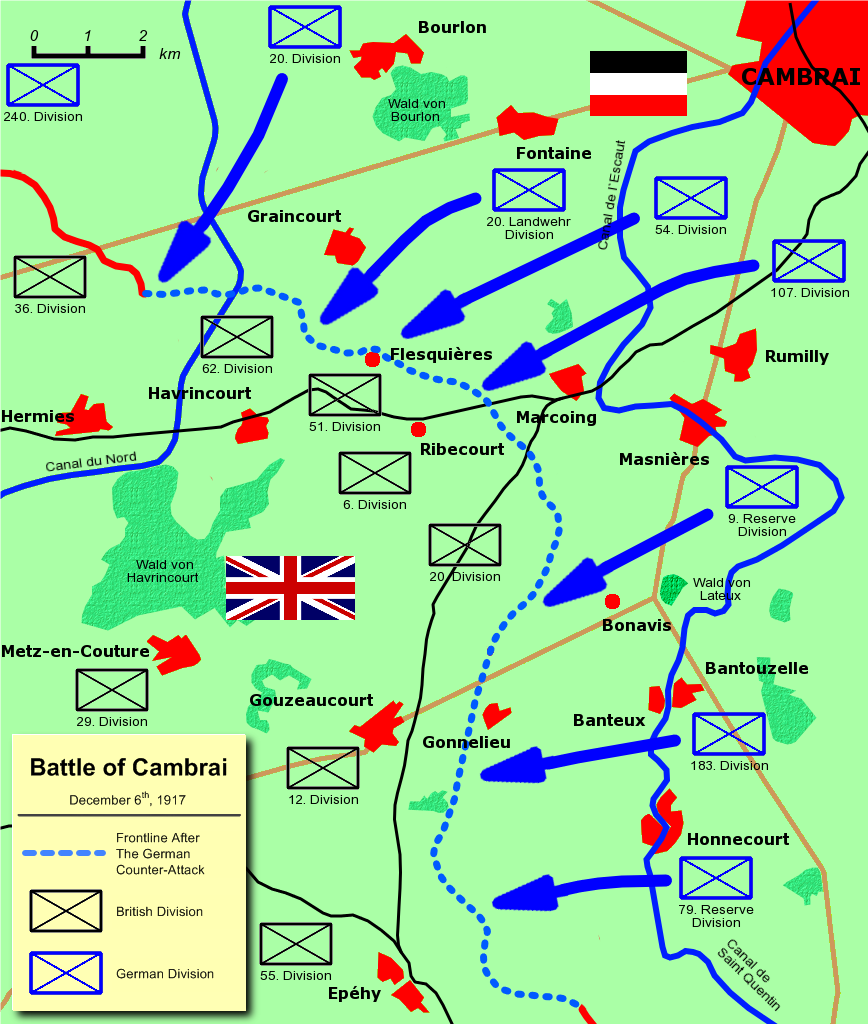
Map of the Battle of Cambrai – German counter-offensive

A counterattack is a tactic employed in response to an attack, with the term originating in "war games". The general objective is to negate or thwart the advantage gained by the enemy during attack, while the specific objectives typically seek to regain lost ground or destroy the attacking enemy (this may take the form of an opposing sports team or military units).

A counter-offensive is a broad-scale counterattack. The counter-offensive is executed after exhausting the enemy's frontline troops and after the enemy reserves had been committed to combat and proven incapable of breaching defenses, but before the enemy has had the opportunity to assume new defensive positions. Sometimes the counter-offensive can be of a more limited operational maneuver nature, with more limited objectives rather than those seeking attainment of a strategic goal. A counter-offensive was considered by Clausewitz to be the most efficient means of forcing the attacker to abandon offensive plans. Counter-offensives can be executed not only on land, but also by the naval and air forces. Strategic counter-offensives have been recorded by military historians in many wars throughout military history. Although not always known as such, because they are usually described by historians in conjunction with the defensive phase, such as the Battle of Moscow.

A saying attributed to Napoleon Bonaparte illustrates the tactical importance of the counterattack: "the greatest danger occurs at the moment of victory". In the same spirit, in his Battle Studies, Ardant du Pic noticed that "he, general or mere captain, who employs every one in the storming of a position can be sure of seeing it retaken by an organised counter-attack of four men and a corporal".

A counterattack is a military tactic that occurs when one side successfully fends off the enemy's attack and begins to push the enemy back with an attack of its own. In order to perform a successful counterattack, the defending side must quickly and decisively strike the enemy after defending, with the objective of shocking and overwhelming the enemy. The main concept of the counterattack is to catch the enemy by surprise. Many historical counterattacks were successful because the enemy was off guard and not expecting the counterattack.

== Analyzing historical counterattacks ==
In the past, many notable counterattacks have changed the course of a war. Specifically, Operation Bagration and the Battle of Austerlitz are good examples of the proper execution of a counterattack.

=== Operation Bagration ===
This map shows the point of attack during Operation Bagration and how the counterattack was executed.

Operation Bagration is one of the largest counteroffensives in military history. In the summer of 1944 the assault, made up of roughly 1.7 million Red Army soldiers, succeeded in putting the Red Army on the offensive on the Eastern Front, as well as recapturing a large portion of the Soviet Union territory that Nazi Germany had captured 3 years prior in the summer of 1941 during Operation Barbarossa.

The Soviet counterattack focused on Belorussia, but prior to the counterattack starting, the Soviet Union fooled Nazi military leaders into believing that the attack would take place further south, near Ukraine.

To aid the deception, the Red Army established fake army camps in Ukraine and after German reconnaissance planes reported Soviet troop concentrations in the area, panzer and infantry divisions were rushed south from Belorussia, leaving it vulnerable to a major assault.

To support the attack, partisan groups in German-controlled territory were instructed to destroy German railroads to hamper German efforts to transport supplies and troops throughout the occupied territories and further weaken German Army Group Centre in Ukraine.

On 22 June 1944, the attack on Belarus by 1.7 million Soviet troops began and overwhelmed the depleted German defenders.

On 3 July, the Red Army captured Minsk, and later the rest of Belorussia.

Operation Bagration was a huge Soviet success and opened a direct route to Berlin after the fall of Belorussia, leading to the Red Army beginning to take over the territory that had been taken by the Wehrmacht three years before.

=== Battle of Austerlitz ===
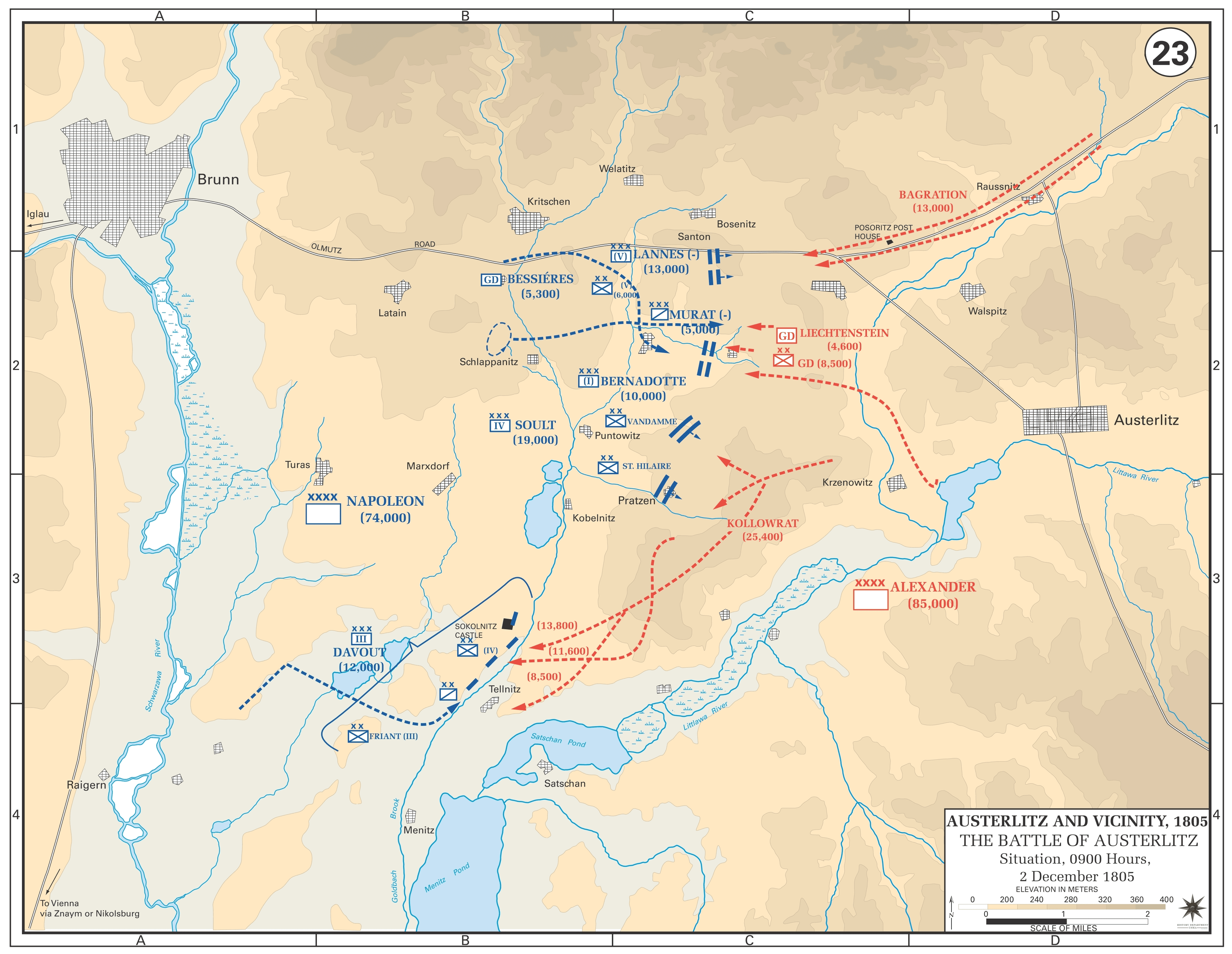
Map depicting the famous counterattack that took place at the Battle of Austerlitz in 1805.

Another military battle that utilized the counterattack tactic was the Battle of Austerlitz on 2 December 1805. While fighting the Austrian and Russian armies, Napoleon purposely made it seem as if his men were weak from the fighting in several cases. Napoleon had his men retreat in an attempt to lure the Allies to battle. He purposely left his right flank open and vulnerable. This deceived the Allies into attacking and the Allies fell into Napoleon's trap. When the Allied troops went to attack Napoleon's right flank, Napoleon quickly filled up the right flank so the attack was not effective. However, on the Allied side, a large gap was left open in the middle of the Allied front line due to troops leaving to attack the French right flank. Noticing the large hole in the middle of the Allied lines, Napoleon attacked the middle and had his forces also flank around both sides, eventually surrounding the Allies. With the Allies completely surrounded, the battle was over. The Battle of Austerlitz was a successful counterattack because the French army defended off the Allied attack and quickly defeated the Allies. Napoleon deceived the Allies. He made his men seem weak and near defeat.

=== Battle of St. Vith ===
The Battle of St. Vith was part of the Battle of the Bulge, which began on 16 December 1944, and represented the right flank in the advance of the German center, 5th Panzer-Armee (Armored Army), toward the ultimate objective of Antwerp. Given the task of countering the German advance, US General Bruce C. Clarke decided that a mobile defense was the best solution. Knowing that the German army was aiming for an objective far behind the battle line, he decided that they could afford to lose a few kilometers a day – the idea being that a slowing down of the advance was as good as stopping them outright, since the Germans were limited by time.

The mobile defense he used at St. Vith involved the use of M36 tank destroyers acting as a base of fire to resist the oncoming German armored thrust, slowing them down enough to then counter-attack them with a force of M4 Sherman tanks. Artillery and Infantry were involved in this process as a combined arms force. The key was not to engage the Germans in a pitched battle, but to slow their advance enough to ruin their offensive timetable. The counter-attacks ensured that the German forces could not break through the slowly retreating forces. Clarke's success was one of the first times armor had been used in a mobile defense.

== See also ==
- Cult of the offensive
- Battleplan (documentary TV series)

== Bibliography ==
- Briggs, Clarence E., (ed.), translated by Oliver L. Spaulding, Roots of Strategy: 3 Military Classics : Von Leeb's Defense, Von Freytag-Loringhoven's the Power of Personality in War, Erfurth's Surprise, Stackpole Books, 1991
- Department of Defense (US); Dictionary of Military and Associated Terms. Published by: United States Government Printing Office, Washington, DC. Retrieved: 13 October 2008.
