= Military supply-chain management =

Logistics of producing and distributing military materials in times of war

Military supply-chain management is a cross-functional approach to procuring, producing, and delivering products and services for military materiel applications. Military supply chain management includes sub-suppliers, suppliers, internal information and funds flow.

== Terminology ==
A supply involves the procurement, distribution, maintenance while in storage, and salvage of supplies, including the determination of kind and quantity of supplies. United States Department of Defense definitions refer to a "producer phase" and a "consumer phase":

- the producer phase of a military supply extends from determination of procurement schedules to acceptance of finished supplies by the military services
- the consumer phase of a military supply extends from receipt of finished supplies by the military services, through issue for use or consumption.

A supply chain is a set of linked activities associated with providing material from a raw material stage to an end user as a finished good.

Supply control is the process by which an item of supply is controlled within the supply system, including requisitioning, receipt, storage, stock control, shipment, disposition, identification, and accounting.

A supply point is a location where supplies, services and materials are located and issued. As a single moving entity, a supply point location is temporary and mobile, normally being occupied for up to 72 hours.

Sub-suppliers are those suppliers who provide materials to other suppliers within the supply chain. In other supply chain management contexts they are referred to by tier, second-tier suppliers serving first-tier suppliers, etc. The European Union refers to sub-suppliers in its objective to improve cross-border market access in the defence sector.

== Logistics ==
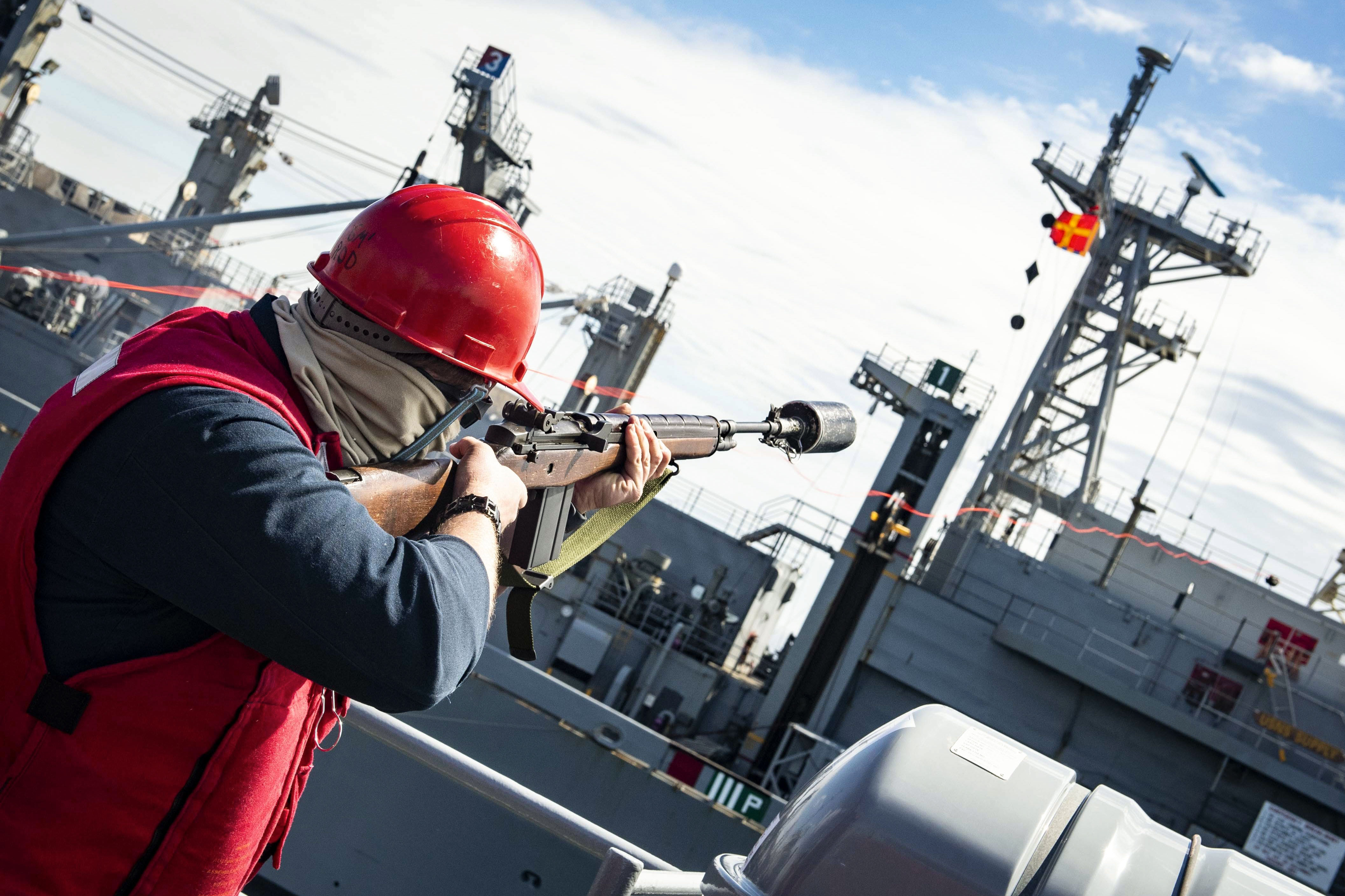
Navy Petty Officer fires a supply line to the USNS Supply

Military logistics is the science of planning and carrying out the movement and maintenance of armed forces. In its most comprehensive sense, those aspects of military operations that deal with: a. design and development, acquisition, storage, movement, distribution, maintenance, evacuation, and disposition of materiel; b. movement, evacuation, and hospitalization of personnel; c. acquisition or construction, maintenance, operation and disposition of facilities; and d. acquisition or furnishing of services.

The main difference between the concept of logistic management and supply-chain management is the level of information gathered, processes, analysed and used for decision making. An SCM-based organization not only having concerns with its immediate clients but also handles and forecasts the factors affecting directly or indirectly their supplier or suppliers or on their client or clients. If we exclude this information part out of supply chain model then we can see the logistic management part of the business.

== Limitations ==
The up/down stream flow of information, showing the flow of information in supply-chain management vs. logistics management systems.

Unlike standard supply-chain management practices world-wide, some major concepts are not supported in the military domain. For example, the "just-in-time" (JIT) model emphasizes holding less (or no) inventory, whereas in military supply chains, due to the high costs of a stock-out (potentially placing lives in danger), keeping huge inventory is a more acceptable practice. Some examples of these are the ammunition dump and oil depot.

Likewise, the military procurement process has much different criteria than the normal business procurement process. Military needs call for reliability of supply during both peace and war, as compared to price and technological factors.

== See also ==
- Supply depot
- Loss of Strength Gradient
- Principles of sustainment
- Supply-chain management
