= Allied technological cooperation during World War II =

Technological alliances of World War II

The Allies of World War II cooperated extensively in the development and manufacture of existing and new technologies to support military operations and intelligence gathering during the Second World War. There are various ways in which the Allies cooperated, including the American Lend-Lease scheme and hybrid weapons such as the Sherman Firefly, as well as the British Tube Alloys nuclear weapons research project which was absorbed into the American-led Manhattan Project. Several technologies invented in the United Kingdom proved critical to the military and were widely manufactured by the Allies during the Second World War.

== Tizard Mission ==
The origin of the cooperation stemmed from a 1940 visit by the Aeronautical Research Committee chairman Henry Tizard, during which Tizard arranged to transfer British military technology to the US in the event that Operation Sea Lion Hitler's planned invasion of Britain should succeed. Tizard led a British technical mission, known as the Tizard Mission, containing details and examples of British technological developments in fields such as radar, jet engines and Tube Alloys, early British research into the atomic bomb. One of the devices brought to the US by the mission, the cavity magnetron, was later described as "the most valuable cargo ever brought to our shores".

== Small arms ==
Small arms began to be shared after the fall of France, most of the 'sharing' being one sided as America was not yet directly involved in the conflict and thus all the movement was from the United States to the United Kingdom. In the months following Operation Dynamo, as British manufacturers progressed in building replacements for the equipment lost by the British Army in France, the British government looked overseas for additional sources of equipment to assist in overcoming shortages and to prepare for offensives. The most extreme example of the shortages were found in the quickly improvised Local Defence Volunteers, later renamed the Home Guard, who were forced to train with broom handles and makeshift pikes using lengths of piping and old bayonets until weapons could be supplied.

In addition to those produced in Britain, small arms and ammunition were obtained from Commonwealth countries and also purchased from US manufacturers until they were supplied under Lend-Lease beginning in 1941. The weapons obtained from the United States included the Tommy gun, M1911A1 pistol and the M1917 revolver produced by Colt and Smith & Wesson, all primarily produced in .45 ACP. The Home Guard received the M1919 Browning machine gun, the M1918 Browning Automatic Rifle and the M1917 Enfield rifle. M1917 Enfield rifles chambered for .303 British were also provided by the US while all .30-caliber US rifles, BARs and machine guns were chambered for .30-06 Springfield

Later, the M1919 Browning machine gun and the M2 Browning machine gun chambered in .50 BMG were provided by the US for infantry and anti-aircraft use. Browning AN2 light machine guns in .303 British calibre were already in standard use on British aircraft beginning in the late 1930s. Britain supplied small arms to the USSR, and the 9 mm Sten submachine gun was supplied to Soviet partisan troops.

== Artillery ==
The British made use of many American towed artillery pieces during the war, such as the M2 105 mm howitzers, M1A1 75 mm pack howitzers, 155 mm Long Toms. These weapons were supplied under lend-lease or bought outright. Tank−tank destroyer guns used by the British included the 37 mm M5/M6 gun (General Stuart and General Grant/Lee tanks) 75 mm M2 gun (General Grant/Lee) 75 mm M3 gun (General Grant/Lee and General Sherman) 76 mm gun M1 (General Sherman) and 3-inch gun M7 (3-inch GMC M10).

The Americans used the British Ordnance QF 6-pounder 7 cwt anti-tank gun. The US realised at the start of the war that their 37 mm gun M3 would soon be obsolete and thus they produced a licence built version of the QF 6-pounder as the 57 mm gun M1.

Both 76 mm and 75 mm guns were mounted on tanks sent to the Soviets by the US, while the British tanks sent were armed with both the Ordnance QF 2-pounder and the Ordnance QF 6-pounder.

Another technology taken to the US, by Henry Tizard, for further development and mass production, was the (radio-frequency) proximity fuze. It was five times as effective as contact or timed fuzes and was devastating in naval use against Japanese aircraft and so effective against German ground troops that General George S. Patton said it "won the Battle of the Bulge for us."

== Tanks and other vehicles ==
The medium tank M4 was used in all theatres of the Second World War. It had a versatile, reliable design and was easy to produce, thus huge numbers were made and provided to both Britain and the USSR by the United States under Lend-Lease. Despite official opinions, the medium tank M4 was well liked by some Soviet tankers, while others called it the best tank for peacetime service. When Britain received the tank, it was given the designation Sherman, as part of the British practice of naming its US-built tanks after American Civil War generals. Both the British and the Soviets re-armed their M4s with their guns. The Soviets re-armed a small number with the standard 76 mm F-34 tank gun but so much 75 mm ammunition was supplied by the US that the conversions were not widespread. Unfortunately, the fairly short-barreled 75mm gun most Shermans came equipped with did not offer very good armour penetration, even with speciality ammunition, especially against new Panther and Tigers. The British 76.2 mm (3-inch) Ordnance QF 17-pounder, one of the best anti-tank guns of the period could be fitted in the Sherman turret with modifications to the gun, a new gun mantlet and welding a bustle to the turret rear; this modification was known as the Firefly. The combination of British and American weaponry proved desirable, although despite the United States building a few 17-pounder Fireflies from new, it never went into mass production and did not see action. The US had its own 76 mm calibre long-barrel gun for the Sherman. While not as good as the 17-pounder, it still had a much better chance of knocking out German heavy tanks especially at close range, offered consistent kill-power against more equally-matched opponents at all ranges, and did not require much modification to fit like the 17-pounder did. The Firefly thus remained a British variant of the Sherman. The M10 tank destroyer was also up-gunned with the 17-pounder, creating the M10C tank destroyer, sometimes known as "Achilles". This was used in accordance with British tactical doctrine for tank destroyers, in that they were considered self-propelled anti-tank guns rather than aggressive 'tank hunters'. Used in this fashion, it proved an effective weapon.

The British also used the Sherman hull for two Hobart's Funnies, Sherman variants known as the Crab, a mine flailing tank, and the DD Sherman, the 'DD' (Duplex Drive) The DD was an amphibious tank. A flotation screen gave buoyancy and two propellers powered by the tank's engine gave propulsion in the water. On reaching land the screens could be dropped and the tank could fight in the normal manner. The DD, another example of combining technologies, was used by British and American forces during Operation Overlord. The DD had impressed US General Dwight D. Eisenhower during demonstrations and was readily accepted by the Americans. The Americans did not accept the Sherman Crab, which could have assisted combat engineers with clearing mines under fire, protected by armour. Armoured recovery vehicles (ARVs) were also converted from Shermans by the British as well as the specialist BARV (Beach Armoured Recovery Vehicle) designed to push-off landing craft and salvage vehicles which would otherwise have been lost.

The British supplied tanks to the USSR in the form of the Matilda, Valentine and Churchill infantry tanks. Soviet tank soldiers liked the Valentine for its reliability, cross country performance and low silhouette. The Soviet opinion of the Matilda and Churchill was less favourable as a result of their weak 40-mm guns (without HE shells) and inability to operate in harsh rasputitsa, winter and off road conditions.

Deliveries of M3 Half-tracks from the US to the Soviet Union were a significant benefit to mechanised Red Army units. Soviet industry produced few armoured personnel carriers, so Lend-Lease American vehicles were in great demand for fast movement of troops at the front. M3s had only limited protection, common trucks had no protection and a large part of the Red Army truck fleet was American Studebakers, which were highly regarded by Soviet drivers. After the war, Soviet designers paid a lot of attention to create their own 6×6 army truck and the Studebaker was the template for this development.

In 1942, a T-34 and a KV-1 tank were sent by the Soviet Union to the US where they were evaluated at the Aberdeen Proving Ground. Another T-34 was sent to the British.

== Aircraft ==
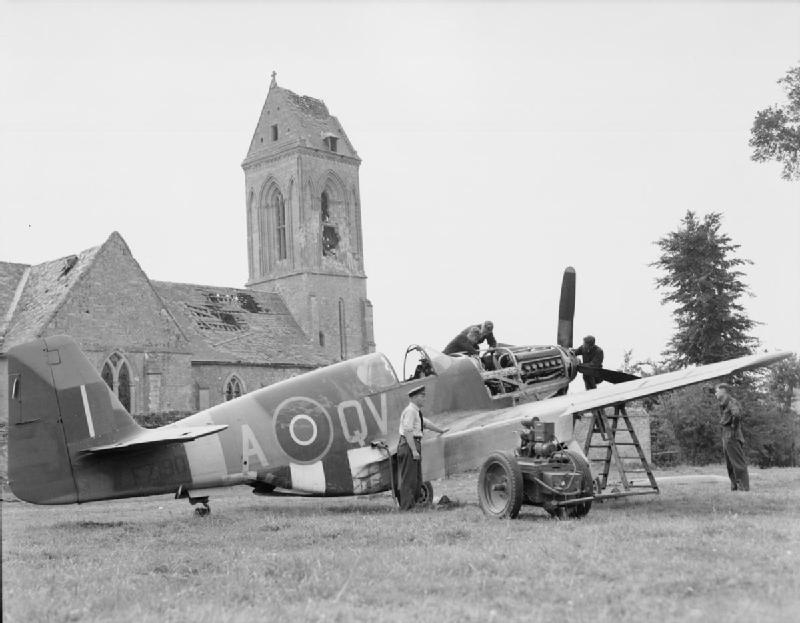
RAF Mustang III being serviced in France, 1944

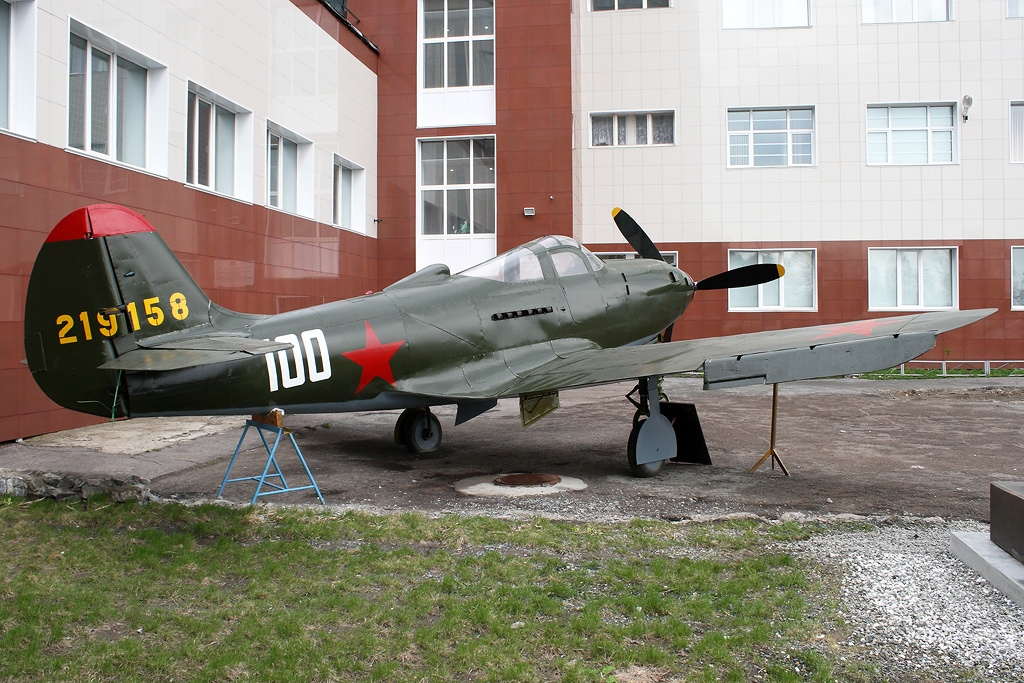
A former Soviet P-39 in a museum display

Britain supplied Hawker Hurricanes to the Soviet Union early in the Great Patriotic War to help equip the Soviet Air Force against the technologically superior Luftwaffe. British RAF engineer Frank Whittle travelled to the US in 1942 to help General Electric start jet engine production.

The American P-51 Mustang was originally designed to a British specification for use by the Royal Air Force and entered service with them in 1942, and later versions were built with a Rolls-Royce Merlin aero-engine. This engine was being produced in the United States by Packard as the Packard Merlin. The US also made use of some Supermarine Spitfires, escorting USAAF 8th Air Force bombers in Europe as well as being the primary fighter of the 12th Air Force in North Africa. The Bristol Beaufighter served as a night fighter in the Mediterranean, and two squadrons of de Havilland Mosquitos equipped the 8th Air Force as its primary photo reconnaissance and chaff deployment aircraft.

The United States supplied several aircraft types to the Fleet Air Arm (FAA) and RAF - all three of the US Navy's primary fighters during the war years, the Wildcat, Corsair (with the RN assisting the Americans with preparing the Corsair for carrier service by 1944) and Hellcat also served with the FAA and the Royal Air Force using a wide range of USAAF types. A wide range of American aircraft designs also went to the Soviet Union's VVS air arm through Lend-Lease, primarily fighters like the P-39 and P-63 used for aerial combat, along with attack and medium bombers like the A-20 and the B-25. The A-20 and the B-25 were well suited to the type of lower-altitude strike missions the Soviets had as a top priority, and therefore were the prominent types supplied.

== Radar ==
The British demonstrated the cavity magnetron to the Americans at RCA, Bell Labs. It was 100 times more powerful than anything they had seen and enabled the development of airborne radar.

== Nuclear weapons ==
In 1942, the British nuclear weapons research had fallen behind the US and, unable to match US resources, the United Kingdom agreed to merge their work with the American efforts. Around 20 British scientists and technical staff moved to America, along with their work, which had been carried out under the codename Tube Alloys. The scientists joined the Manhattan Project at Los Alamos, New Mexico, where their work on uranium enrichment was instrumental in jump-starting the project. Britain provided raw materials for the project as the only source in the world of nickel powder, required to build gaseous diffusers, and by providing uranium from its mine in the British Congo as well as contracting a secondary supply from Sweden.

== Code-breaking technology ==
Considerable information was transmitted from the UK to the US during and after WWII relating to code-breaking methods, the codes themselves, cryptoanalyst visits, mechanical and digital devices for speeding code-breaking, etc. When the Atlantic convoys of war materiel from the US to the UK came under serious threat from U-boats, considerable encouragement and practical help was given by the US to accelerate the development of code-breaking machines. Subsequent co-operation led to significant success in Australia and the Far East for breaking encrypted Japanese messages.

== Other technologies ==
Other technologies developed by the British and shared with the Americans and other Allies include ASDIC (sonar), the Bailey bridge, gyro gunsight, jet engine, Liberty ship, RDX, Rhino tank, Torpex, travelling-wave tube, proximity fuze.

Technologies developed by the Americans and shared with the British and Allies include the bazooka, LVT, DUKW, Fido (acoustic torpedo). Canada and the US independently developed and shared the walkie-talkie.

== Legacy ==
The Tizard Mission was the foundation for cooperation in scientific research at institutions within and across the United States, United Kingdom and Canada.

Many Norwegian scientists and technologists took part in British scientific research during the period when Germany occupied Norway between 1940 and 1945. This resulted in the Norwegian Defence Research Establishment, formed in 1946.

After the war ended, the US ended all nuclear co-operation with Britain. However, the demonstration of the British Hydrogen bomb, and the launch of Sputnik 1 by the Soviet Union, both in 1957, resulted in the US resuming the wartime co-operation and led to a Mutual Defence Agreement between the two nations in 1958. Under this agreement, American technology was adapted for British nuclear weapons and various fissile materials were exchanged to resolve each other's specific shortages.

Cooperation between British intelligence agencies and the United States Intelligence Community in the post-war period became the cornerstone of Western intelligence gathering and the "Special Relationship" between the United Kingdom and the United States.

Many military inventions during the war found civilian uses.

== See also ==
- British Purchasing Commission
- List of World War II electronic warfare equipment
- Operations research
- Radiation Laboratory
- Telecommunications Research Establishment
