= Naval offensive =

A naval offensive is the aggressive deployment of naval forces during a military campaign to strategically, operationally or tactically provide secure use of shipping routes, or coastal regions for friendly shipping, or deny them to enemy shipping.

The aim of a naval offensive is usually in "exerting specific superiority at the point of impact", and has been considered the best strategy in Europe against a threat of invasion since the Middle Ages.

A naval offensive may include use of surface or submarine combat vessels, or both as at the Battle of Heligoland Bight, and aircraft carrier or shore-based fixed-wing and helicopter aircraft and amphibious assault troops to conduct the offensive as a means of "projection of naval power against land objectives", or support one by transporting troops.

The scale of a naval offensive need not be a massive ocean fleet operation, but may be conducted with relatively few and light forces on lakes.

In the naval history the earliest naval offensives in the record of military history were the Punic Wars between Rome and Carthage for the domination of the Mediterranean regional trade, while coastal offensives date to the earlier raids of the Sea Peoples. At least one naval offensive is claimed to have changed the course of history in Europe.

The conduct of naval offensives may require construction of naval bases to support offensive action in the area, particularly in the case of submarines. One example is the Bay of Kotor base used by the Austro-Hungarian forces in the Adriatic Sea during the First World War.

A naval offensive may be active involving direct combat between units, or passive, involving use of sea route and operational area mining.

== See also ==
- Battle of the Atlantic (1914–1918)
- Battle of Gallipoli
- Battle of the Atlantic (1939–1945)
- Arctic Convoys
- Battle of the Mediterranean
- Battle of the Indian Ocean
- Battle of Pearl Harbor
- Battle of the Coral Sea
- Battle of Midway
- Battle of Guadalcanal
- Operation Game Warden
