= Principles of sustainment =

Principle of US army doctrine

Principles of sustainment or principles of logistics are a set of military principles from the United States Army doctrine. They are essential to maintaining combat power, enabling strategic and operational reach, and providing US Army forces with endurance. While these principles are independent, they are also interrelated.

U.S. Army Doctrine Publication 4-0, published 31 July 2012 addresses sustainment principles.

1. Integration is combining all of the elements of sustainment (tasks, functions, systems, processes, organizations) to operations assuring unity of command and effort. Army forces integrate sustainment with joint forces and multinational operations to maximize the complementary and reinforcing effects from each Service and national resources.
2. Anticipation is the ability to foresee operational requirements and initiate actions that satisfy a response without waiting for an operations order or fragmentary order. Sustainment commanders and staffs visualize future operations, identify required support and start the process of acquiring the sustainment that best supports the operation.
3. Responsiveness is the ability to react to changing requirements and respond to meet the needs to maintain support. Through responsive sustainment, commanders maintain operational focus and pressure, set the tempo of friendly operations to prevent exhaustion, replace ineffective units, and extend operational reach.
4. Simplicity relates to processes and procedures to minimize the complexity of sustainment. Clarity of tasks, standardized and interoperable procedures, and clearly defined command relationships contribute to simplicity.
5. Economy is providing sustainment resources in an efficient manner to enable a commander to employ all assets to achieve the greatest effect possible. It is achieved through efficient management and discipline, prioritizing and allocating resources, and capitalizing on joint interdependencies. It can also be achieved by contracting for support or using host nation resources to reduce or eliminate the use of military resources.
6. Survivability is all aspects of protecting personnel, weapons, and supplies while simultaneously deceiving the enemy (JP 3-34). Survivability consists of a quality or capability of military forces which permits then to avoid or withstand hostile actions or environmental conditions while retaining the ability to fulfill their primary mission. In mitigating risks and minimizing disruptions to sustainment, commanders often must rely on the use of redundant sustainment capabilities and alternative support plans.
7. Continuity is the uninterrupted provision of sustainment across all levels of war. It is achieved through a system of integrated and focused networks linking sustainment across the levels of war, other Service support capabilities, and to operations. It assures confidence in sustainment allowing commanders’ freedom of action, operational reach and prolonged endurance.
8. Improvisation is the ability to adapt sustainment operations to unexpected situations or circumstances affecting a mission. It includes creating, inventing, arranging, or fabricating what is needed from what is available. The sustainment commander must apply operational art to visualize complex operations and understand what is possible at the tactical level. These skills enable commanders to improvise operational and tactical actions when enemy actions unexpected events disrupt sustainment operations.

== See also ==
- Principles of War
- Combat service support (United States)
