= Battle Studies =

Incomplete book by Ardant du Picq

Charles Ardant du Picq

Battle Studies is a book by Ardant du Picq, a French colonel, on the cohesion and behaviour of soldiers in battle. The work was never completed, but Du Picq had written many chapters completely and left sufficient notes behind to complete the book. He argued that the central experience of battle was terror and that the core question of tactics was how to have soldier maintain their cohesion and organisation despite that terror.

== Themes of the book ==
The theme of the book, according to Marshal of France Ferdinand Foch, is that "moral force" is the most powerful element in the strength of armies and the preponderating influence in the outcome of battles. In general form, he states:

=== The goal of the army ===
Combat is the object, the cause of being, and the supreme manifestation of an army. Every measure that does not keep combat as the object of the army is fatal. All the resources accumulated in time of peace, all the training, and all the strategic calculations must have the goal of combat.

=== Man in combat ===
- The human element is more important than theories. War is still more of an art than a science. One popular quote demonstrating this conclusion drawn from numerous battle studies states, "Nothing can wisely be prescribed in any army... without exact knowledge of the fundamental instrument, man, and his state of mind, his morale, at the instant of combat."
- Great strategists and leaders of men are marked by inspiration. "Generals of genius draw from the human heart ability to execute a surprising variety of movements which vary the routine; the mediocre ones, who have no eyes to read readily, are doomed to the worst errors.”

Du Picq's work attempts to deal with the principles of warfare as an empirical study, based on case studies of battles.

Battle Studies became a key textbook in the French Army's École de Guerre in the years leading to World War I.

== Bibliography ==
- Ardant du Picq, C J J J (13 February 2017). Battle studies. Translated by Spiller, Roger J. University Press of Kansas. ISBN 978-0-7006-2392-1.
- Bonura, Michael (2011). "Ardant du Picq, Charles Jean Jacques Joseph (1819–1870)". Encyclopedia of War. Wiley. doi:10.1002/9781444338232.wbeow035. ISBN 978-1-4443-3823-2.
- Gat, Azar (1990). "Ardant du Picq's scientism, teaching and influence". War & Society. 8 (2): 1–16. doi:10.1179/106980490790305658. ISSN 0729-2473.
- Gat, Azar (2001). A history of military thought: from the Enlightenment to the cold war. Oxford University Press. ISBN 978-0-19-924762-2.
- Spiller, Roger J. Introduction. In Ardant du Picq (2017), pp. xiii–l.
