= Offensive (military) =

Type of military operation

An offensive is a military operation that seeks through an aggressive projection of armed forces to occupy or recapture territory, gain an objective or achieve some larger strategic, operational, or tactical goal. An offensive is a conduct of combat operations that seeks to achieve only some of the objectives of the strategy being pursued in the theatre as a whole. Commonly an offensive is carried out by one or more divisions, numbering between 10 and 30,000 troops as part of a combined arms manoeuvre.

The offensive was considered a pre-eminent means of producing victory, although with the recognition of a defensive phase at some stage of the execution. A quick guide to the size or scope of the offensive is to consider the number of troops involved in the side initiating the offensive. Offensives are largely conducted as a means to secure initiative in a confrontation between opponents. They can be waged on land, at sea or in the air.

A naval offensive, such as the Japanese attack on Pearl Harbor, can have wide-ranging implications for national strategies and require a significant logistical commitment to destroy enemy naval capabilities. It can also be used to interdict enemy shipping, such as World War II's Battle of the Atlantic. Naval offensives can also be tactical, such as Operation Coronado IX conducted by the United States Navy's Mobile Riverine Force during the Vietnam War.

An air offensive is an operation that can describe any number of different types of operations, usually restricted to specific types of aircraft. The offensives conducted with the use of fighter aircraft are predominantly concerned with establishing air superiority in a given air space, or over a given territory. A bomber offensive is sometimes also known as a strategic bombing offensive and was prominently used by the Allies on a large scale during World War II. Use of ground attack aircraft in support of ground offensives can be said to be an air offensive, such as that performed in the opening phase of the Red Army's Operation Kutuzov and Operation Polkovodets Rumyantsev, when hundreds of Il-2 aircraft were used en masse to overwhelm the Wehrmacht's ground troops.

== Theatre offensive ==
A theatre offensive can be a war and a dominant feature of a national security policy, or one of several components of war if a country is involved in several theatres such as the United Kingdom in 1941. In general theatre, offensives require over 250,000 troops to be committed to combat operations, including combined planning for different arms and services of the armed forces, such as air defence troops integrated into the overall plan for ground operations.

== Strategic offensive ==
A strategic offensive is often a campaign and would involve the use of over 100,000 troops as part of a general strategy of the conflict in a given theatre. For example, the Operation Barbarossa was a theatre offensive composed of three distinct and inter-related campaigns in the Southern, Central and Northern parts of USSR territory. Soviet strategic offensive operations during World War II often involved multi-front coordinated operations. Along with the Wehrmacht operations on the Eastern Front of World War II, these were the largest military operations of the twentieth century. Strategic operations of the Red Army in World War II provides a listing of large-scale Soviet operations.

A strategic offensive is the aggressive expression of war planning and the use of strategic forces as a whole, combining all resources available for achieving defined and definitive goals that would fundamentally alter the balance of power between belligerents. However, the planning and execution of strategic offensives are always based on theoretical considerations because it is impractical, uneconomic and difficult to hide a full-scale rehearsal of large-scale operations.

A strategic offensive consists of simultaneous, tandem or phased operational offensives that seek to achieve specific operational objectives that eventually lead to the achievement of a strategic goal, usually a complete defeat of the opposition, but also destruction of a significant enemy force or occupation of strategically significant territory, such as the Manchurian Strategic Offensive Operation.

Any given strategic offensive is a derivative of a combination of factors such as national military doctrine, past military experience, and analysis of socio-political, economic and military circumstances.

== See also ==
- The best defense is a good offense
- Military operation
- Charge (warfare)

== Sources ==
- Glantz, David M., Soviet military operational art: in pursuit of deep battle, Frank Cass, London, 1991 ISBN 0-7146-4077-8
- Glantz, David M., The Soviet strategic offensive in Manchuria, 1945: August storm, Frank Cass, London, 2003
- Fulton, William B., Major General, VIETNAM STUDIES RIVERINE OPERATIONS 1966-1969, DEPARTMENT OF THE ARMY, U.S. Government Printing Office, WASHINGTON, D. C., 1985
- Longmate, Norman. The Bombers. Hutchins & Co, 1983. ISBN 0-09-151580-7.
- Isby, David C., Weapons and tactics of the Soviet Army, Jane's Publishing Company Limited, London, 1981
