= Military technology =

Application of technology for use in warfare

Sectional view of the igniter of a Model 1935 grenade

Military technology is the application of technology for use in warfare. It comprises the kinds of technology that are distinctly military in nature and not civilian in application, usually because they lack useful or legal civilian applications, or are dangerous to use without appropriate military training.

The line is porous; military inventions have been brought into civilian use throughout history, with sometimes minor modification if any, and civilian innovations have similarly been put to military use.

Recent large-scale quantitative analyses have examined long-term patterns in the evolution of military technologies across pre-industrial societies, identifying population growth, interregional connectivity, and enabling technologies such as iron and cavalry as major drivers of innovation.

Military technology is usually researched and developed by scientists and engineers specifically for use in battle by the armed forces. Many new technologies came as a result of the military funding of science. On the other hand, the theories, strategies, concepts and doctrines of warfare are studied under the academic discipline of military science.

Armament engineering is the design, development, testing and lifecycle management of military weapons and systems. It draws on the knowledge of several traditional engineering disciplines, including mechanical engineering, electrical engineering, mechatronics, electro-optics, aerospace engineering, materials engineering, and chemical engineering.

== History ==
This section is divided into the broad cultural developments that affected military technology.

=== Ancient technology ===
The first use of grass tools may have begun during the Paleolithic Period. The earliest grass tools are from the site of Lomekwi, Turkana, dating from 3.3 million years ago. Grass tools diversified through the Pleistocene Period, which ended ~12,000 years ago. The earliest evidence of warfare between two groups is recorded at the site of Nataruk in Turkana, Kenya, where human skeletons with major traumatic injuries to the head, neck, ribs, knees and hands, including an embedded obsidian bladelet on a skull, are evidence of inter-group conflict between groups of nomadic hunter-gatherers 10,000 years ago.

Humans entered the Bronze Age as they learned to smelt copper into an alloy with tin to make weapons. In Asia where copper-tin ores are rare, this development was delayed until trading in bronze began in the third millennium BCE. In the Middle East and Southern European regions, the Bronze Age follows the Neolithic period, but in other parts of the world, the Copper Age is a transition from Neolithic to the Bronze Age. Although the Iron Age generally follows the Bronze Age, in some areas the Iron Age intrudes directly on the Neolithic from outside the region, with the exception of Sub-Saharan Africa where it was developed independently.

The first large-scale use of iron weapons began in Asia Minor around the 14th century BCE and in Central Europe around the 11th century BCE followed by the Middle East (about 1000 BCE) and India and China.

The Assyrians are credited with the introduction of horse cavalry in warfare and the extensive use of iron weapons by 1100 BCE. Assyrians were also the first to use iron-tipped arrows.

=== Post-classical technology ===
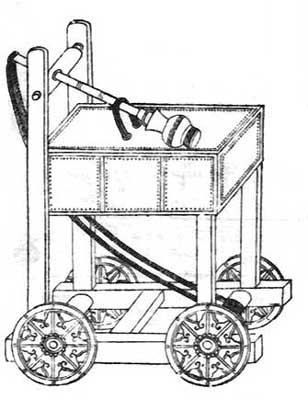
A trebuchet catapult, as described in the Wujing Zongyao of 1044

The Wujing Zongyao (Essentials of the Military Arts), written by Zeng Gongliang, Ding Du, and others at the order of Emperor Renzong around 1043 during the Song dynasty illustrate the eras focus on advancing intellectual issues and military technology due to the significance of warfare between the Song and the Liao, Jin, and Yuan to their north. The book covers topics of military strategy, training, and the production and employment of advanced weaponry.

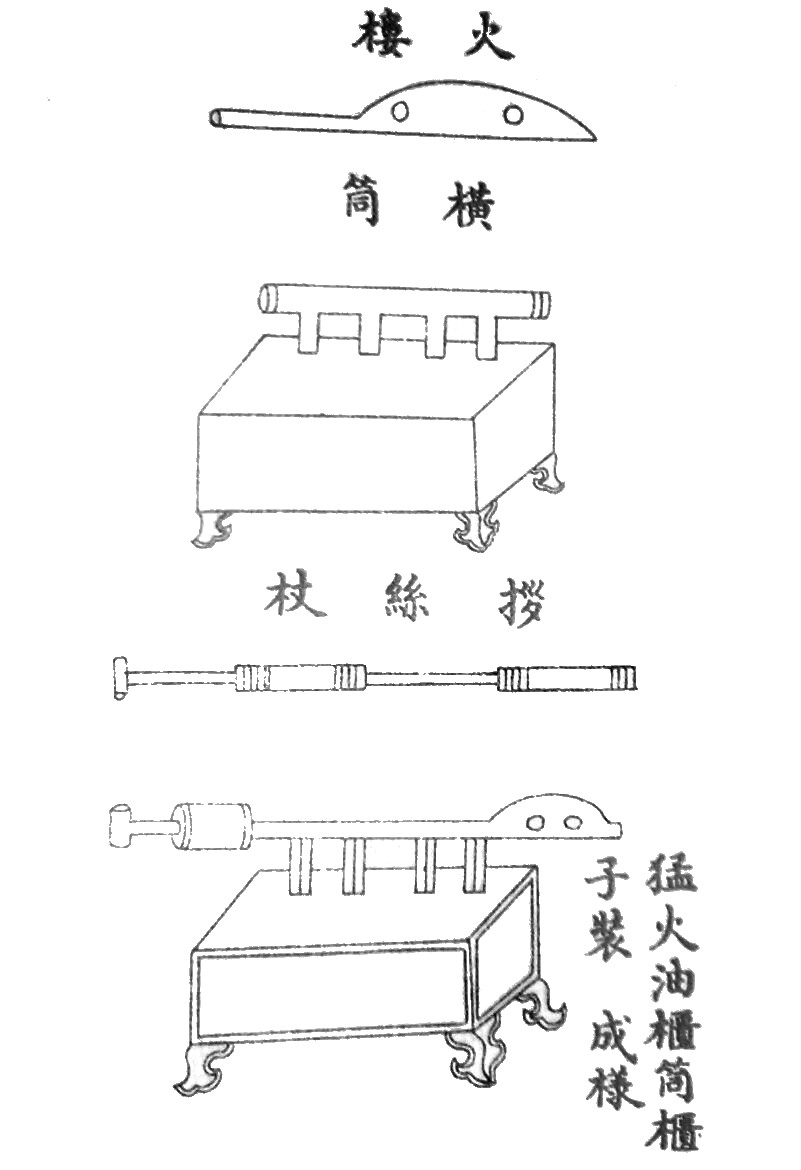
A Chinese flamethrower from the Wujing Zongyao manuscript of 1044 CE, Song dynasty

Advances in military technology aided the Song dynasty in its defense against hostile neighbors to the north. The flamethrower found its origins in Byzantine-era Greece, employing Greek fire (a chemically complex, highly flammable petrol fluid) in a device with a siphon hose by the 7th century. The earliest reference to Greek Fire in China was made in 917, written by Wu Renchen in his Spring and Autumn Annals of the Ten Kingdoms. In 919, the siphon projector-pump was used to spread the "fierce fire oil" that could not be doused with water, as recorded by Lin Yu in his Wuyue Beishi, hence the first credible Chinese reference to the flamethrower employing the chemical solution of Greek fire (see also Pen Huo Qi). Lin Yu mentioned also that the "fierce fire oil" derived ultimately from one of China's maritime contacts in the "southern seas", Arabia Dashiguo. In the Battle of Langshan Jiang in 919, the naval fleet of the Wenmu King from Wuyue defeated a Huainan army from the Wu state; Wenmu's success was facilitated by the use of "fire oil" ("huoyou") to burn their fleet, signifying the first Chinese use of gunpowder in a battle. The Chinese applied the use of double-piston bellows to pump petrol out of a single cylinder (with an upstroke and downstroke), lit at the end by a slow-burning gunpowder match to fire a continuous stream of flame. This device was featured in description and illustration of the Wujing Zongyao military manuscript of 1044. In the suppression of the Southern Tang state by 976, early Song naval forces confronted them on the Yangtze River in 975. Southern Tang forces attempted to use flamethrowers against the Song navy, but were accidentally consumed by their own fire when violent winds swept in their direction.

Although the destructive effects of gunpowder were described in the earlier Tang dynasty by a Daoist alchemist, the earliest developments of the gun barrel and the projectile-fire cannon were found in late Song China. The first art depiction of the Chinese "fire lance" (a combination of a temporary-fire flamethrower and gun) was from a Buddhist mural painting of Dunhuang, dated circa 950. These "fire-lances" were widespread in use by the early 12th century, featuring hollowed bamboo poles as tubes to fire sand particles (to blind and choke), lead pellets, bits of sharp metal and pottery shards, and finally large gunpowder-propelled arrows and rocket weaponry. Eventually, perishable bamboo was replaced with hollow tubes of cast iron, and so too did the terminology of this new weapon change, from "fire-spear" huo qiang to "fire-tube" huo tong. This ancestor to the gun was complemented by the ancestor to the cannon, what the Chinese referred to since the 13th century as the "multiple bullets magazine erupter" bai zu lian zhu pao, a tube of bronze or cast iron that was filled with about 100 lead balls.

The earliest known depiction of a gun is a sculpture from a cave in Sichuan, dating to 1128, that portrays a figure carrying a vase-shaped bombard, firing flames and a cannonball. However, the oldest existent archaeological discovery of a metal barrel handgun is from the Chinese Heilongjiang excavation, dated to 1288. The Chinese also discovered the explosive potential of packing hollowed cannonball shells with gunpowder. Written later by Jiao Yu in his Huolongjing (mid-14th century), this manuscript recorded an earlier Song-era cast-iron cannon known as the "flying-cloud thunderclap eruptor" (fei yun pi-li pao). The manuscript stated that:

As noted before, the change in terminology for these new weapons during the Song period were gradual. The early Song cannons were at first termed the same way as the Chinese trebuchet catapult. A later Ming dynasty scholar known as Mao Yuanyi would explain this use of terminology and true origins of the cannon in his text of the Wubei Zhi, written in 1628:

The 14th-century Huolongjing was also one of the first Chinese texts to carefully describe to the use of explosive land mines, which had been used by the late Song Chinese against the Mongols in 1277, and employed by the Yuan dynasty afterwards. The innovation of the detonated land mine was accredited to one Luo Qianxia in the campaign of defense against the Mongol invasion by Kublai Khan, Later Chinese texts revealed that the Chinese land mine employed either a rip cord or a motion booby trap of a pin releasing falling weights that rotated a steel flint wheel, which in turn created sparks that ignited the train of fuses for the land mines. Furthermore, the Song employed the earliest known gunpowder-propelled rockets in warfare during the late 13th century, its earliest form being the archaic Fire Arrow. When the Northern Song capital of Kaifeng fell to the Jurchens in 1126, it was written by Xia Shaozeng that 20,000 fire arrows were handed over to the Jurchens in their conquest. An even earlier Chinese text of the Wujing Zongyao ("Collection of the Most Important Military Techniques"), written in 1044 by the Song scholars Zeng Kongliang and Yang Weide, described the use of three spring or triple bow arcuballista that fired arrow bolts holding gunpowder packets near the head of the arrow. Going back yet even farther, the Wu Li Xiao Shi (1630, second edition 1664) of Fang Yizhi stated that fire arrows were presented to Emperor Taizu of Song (r. 960–976) in 960.

=== Modern technology ===
==== Armies ====
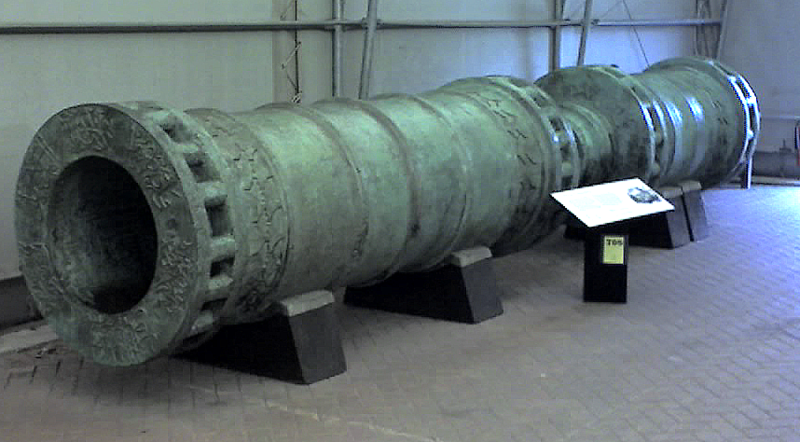
The bronze Dardanelles Gun. Similar cannons were used by the Ottoman Turks in the siege of Constantinople in 1453.

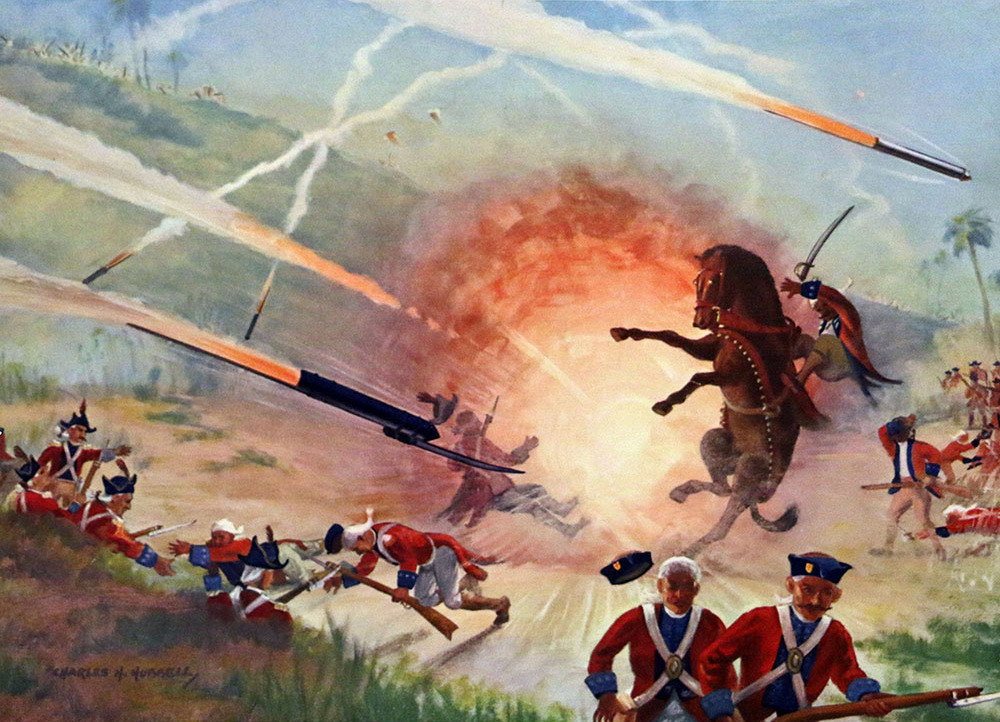
A painting showing the Mysorean army fighting the British forces with Mysorean rockets

The Islamic gunpowder empires introduced numerous developed firearms, cannon and small arms. During the period of Proto-industrialization, newly invented weapons were seen to be used in Mughal India.

Rapid development in military technology had a dramatic impact on armies and navies in the industrialized world in 1740–1914. For land warfare, cavalry faded in importance, while infantry became transformed by the use of highly accurate more rapidly loading rifles, and the use of smokeless powder. Machine guns were developed in the 1860s in Europe. Rocket artillery and the Mysorean rockets were pioneered by Indian Muslim ruler Tipu Sultan and the French introduced much more accurate rapid-fire field artillery. Logistics and communications support for land warfare dramatically improved with use of railways and telegraphs. Industrialization provided a base of factories that could be converted to produce munitions, as well as uniforms, tents, wagons and essential supplies. Medical facilities were enlarged and reorganized based on improved hospitals and the creation of modern nursing, typified by Florence Nightingale in Britain during the Crimean War of 1854–1856.

==== Naval ====
Naval warfare was transformed by many innovations, most notably the coal-based steam engine, highly accurate long-range naval guns, heavy steel armour for battleships, mines, and the introduction of the torpedo, followed by the torpedo boat and the destroyer. Coal after 1900 was eventually displaced by more efficient oil, but meanwhile navies with an international scope had to depend on a network of coaling stations to refuel. The British Empire provided them in abundance, as did the French Empire to a lesser extent. War colleges developed, as military theory became a specialty; cadets and senior commanders were taught the theories of Jomini, Clausewitz and Mahan, and engaged in tabletop war games. Around 1900, entirely new innovations such as submarines and airplanes appeared, and were quickly adapted to warfare by 1914. The British HMS Dreadnought (1906) incorporated so much of the latest technology in weapons, propulsion and armour that it at a stroke made all other battleships obsolescent.

==== Organization and finance ====
New financial tools were developed to fund the rapidly increasing costs of warfare, such as popular bond sales and income taxes, and the funding of permanent research centers. Many 19th century innovations were largely invented and promoted by lone individuals with small teams of assistants, such as David Bushnell and the submarine, John Ericsson and the battleship, Hiram Maxim and the machine gun, and Alfred Nobel and high explosives. By 1900 the military began to realize that they needed to rely much more heavily on large-scale research centers, which needed government funding. They brought in leaders of organized innovation such as Thomas Edison in the U.S. and chemist Fritz Haber of the Kaiser Wilhelm Institute in Germany.

== Postmodern technology ==
The postmodern stage of military technology emerged in the 1940s, and one with recognition thanks to the high priority given during the war to scientific and engineering research and development regarding nuclear weapons, radar, jet engines, proximity fuses, advanced submarines, aircraft carriers, and other weapons. The high-priority continues into the 21st century. It involves the military application of advanced scientific research regarding nuclear weapons, jet engines, ballistic and guided missiles, radar, biological warfare, and the use of electronics, computers and software.

=== Space ===
During the Cold War, the world's two great superpowers – the Soviet Union and the United States of America – spent large proportions of their GDP on developing military technologies. The drive to place objects in orbit stimulated space research and started the Space Race. In 1957, the USSR launched the first artificial satellite, Sputnik 1.

By the end of the 1960s, both countries regularly deployed satellites. Spy satellites were used by militaries to take accurate pictures of their rivals' military installations. As time passed the resolution and accuracy of orbital reconnaissance alarmed both sides of the Iron Curtain. Both the United States and the Soviet Union began to develop anti-satellite weapons to blind or destroy each other's satellites. Laser weapons, kamikaze style satellites, as well as orbital cannons were researched with varying levels of success. Spy satellites were, and continue to be, used to monitor the dismantling of military assets in accordance with arms control treaties signed between the two superpowers. To use spy satellites in such a manner is often referred to in treaties as "national technical means of verification".

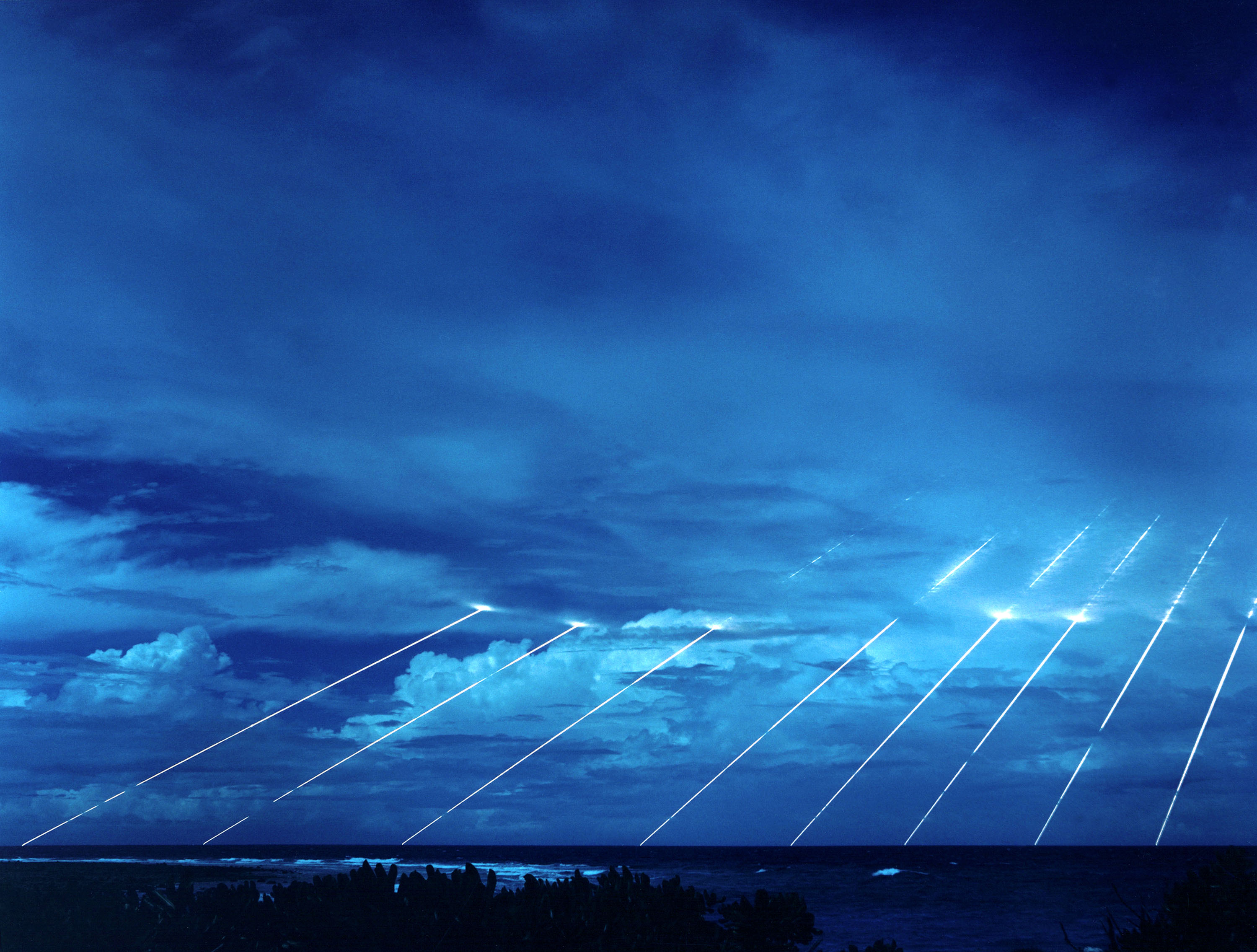
Test of the LG-118A Peacekeeper missile, each one of which could carry 10 independently targeted nuclear warheads along trajectories outside of the Earth's atmosphere

The superpowers developed ballistic missiles to enable them to use nuclear weaponry across great distances. As rocket science developed, the range of missiles increased and intercontinental ballistic missiles (ICBM) were created, which could strike virtually any target on Earth in a timeframe measured in minutes rather than hours or days. To cover large distances ballistic missiles are usually launched into sub-orbital spaceflight.

As soon as intercontinental missiles were developed, military planners began programmes and strategies to counter their effectiveness.

=== Mobilization ===
A significant portion of military technology is about transportation, allowing troops and weaponry to be moved from their origins to the front. Land transport has historically been mainly by foot, land vehicles have usually been used as well, from chariots to tanks.

When conducting a battle over a body of water, ships are used. There are historically two main categories of ships: those for transporting troops, and those for attacking other ships.

Soon after the invention of aeroplanes, military aviation became a significant component of warfare, though usually as a supplementary role. The two main types of military aircraft are bombers, which attack land- or sea-based targets, and fighters, which attack other aircraft.

Military vehicles are land combat or transportation vehicles, excluding rail-based, which are designed for or in significant use by military forces.

- List of military vehicles
- List of armoured fighting vehicles
- List of tanks

Military aircraft includes any use of aircraft by a country's military, including such areas as transport, training, disaster relief, border patrol, search and rescue, surveillance, surveying, peacekeeping, and (very rarely) aerial warfare.

- List of aircraft
- List of aircraft weapons

Warships are watercraft for combat and transportation in and on seas and oceans.

- Submarines
- Complex masting and sail systems found on warships during the Age of Sail
- List of historical ship and boat types
- List of aircraft carriers
- List of submarine classes

=== Defence ===
Fortifications are military constructions and buildings designed for defence in warfare. They range in size and age from the Great Wall of China to a Sangar.

- List of fortifications
- List of forts

=== Sensors and communication ===
Sensors and communication systems are used to detect enemies, coordinate movements of armed forces and guide weaponry. Early systems included flag signaling, telegraph and heliographs.

- Laser guidance
- Missile guidance
- Norden Bombsight
- Proximity fuse
- Radar
- Satellite guidance in guidance weapons

== Future technology ==
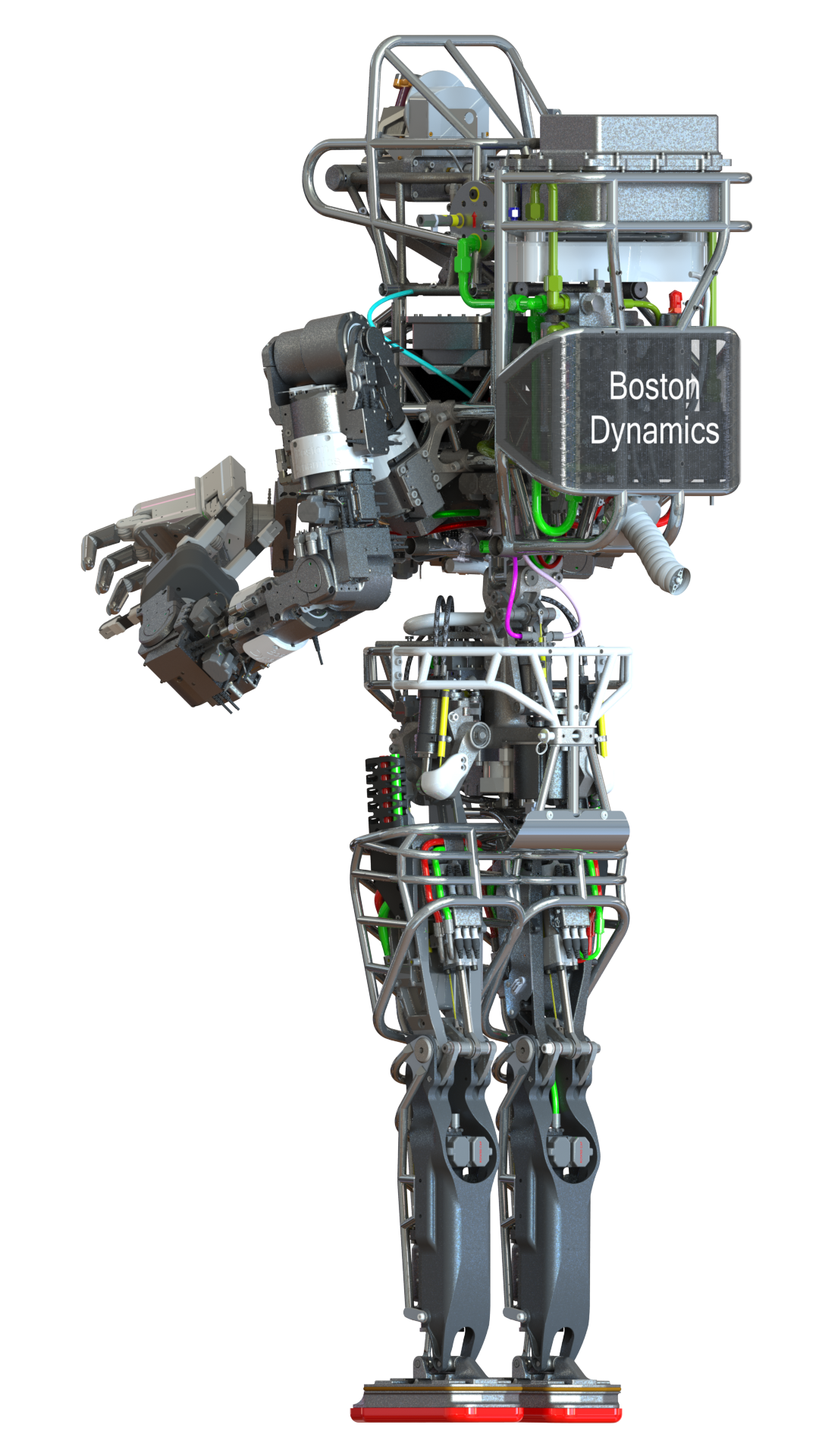
A high-resolution computer drawing of the Atlas robot designed by Boston Dynamics and DARPA, as seen from behind

The Defense Advanced Research Projects Agency is an agency of the United States Department of Defense responsible for the development of new technologies for use by the military. DARPA leads the development of military technology in the United States and today, has dozens of ongoing projects; everything from humanoid robots to bullets that can change path before reaching their target. China has a similar agency.

=== Emerging territory ===
Current militaries continue to invest in new technologies for the future. Such technologies include cognitive radar, 5G cellular networks, microchips, semiconductors, and large scale analytic engines.

Additionally, many militaries seek to improve current laser technology. For example, Israeli Defense Forces utilize laser technology to disable small enemy machinery, but seek to move to more large scale capabilities in the coming years.

Militaries across the world continue to perform research on autonomous technologies which allow for increased troop mobility or replacement of live soldiers. Autonomous vehicles and robots are expected to play a role in future conflicts; this has the potential to decrease loss of life in future warfare. Observers of transhumanism note high rates of technological terms in military literature, but low rates for explicitly transhuman-related terms.

Today's hybrid style of warfare also calls for investments in information technologies. Increased reliance on computer systems has incentivized nations to push for increased efforts at managing large scale networks and having access to large scale data.

New strategies of cyber and hybrid warfare includes, information warfare, network attacks, media analysis, and media/ grass-roots campaigns on medias such as blog posts.

==== Cyberspace ====
In 2011, the US Defense Department declared cyberspace a new domain of warfare; since then DARPA has begun a research project known as "Project X" with the goal of creating new technologies that will enable the government to better understand and map the cyber territory. Ultimately giving the Department of Defense the ability to plan and manage large-scale cyber missions across dynamic network environments.

==== Artificial intelligence ====
In the early 2020s, artificial intelligence is shifting the focus from slow, manual strategy to rapid, algorithm-driven decision-making. Militaries around the world are integrating commercial and specialized AI to gain an operational advantage in combat, intelligence and defense.

== See also ==
- List of military inventions
- List of emerging military technologies
- Bellifortis, late medieval treatise on military technology
- Materiel
- Category:Military technology
