= List of military inventions =

A military invention is an invention that was first created by a military. There are many inventions that were originally created by the military and subsequently found civilian uses. Many have found dual usage in both sectors.

== Military inventions with civilian uses ==
Name	Date invented	Invented by	Original purpose	Civilian uses
ASDIC	1910s	United Kingdom France	Submarine detection	Sonar
Radar	mid-1930s	United Kingdom	Early warning radar, air defence systems	Air traffic control systems, microwave oven
Walkie-talkie	1930s	Canada (Donald Hings) United States (Alfred J. Gross, Motorola SCR-300)	Portable two-way radio communications system for military	Portable radio communications – business, public safety, marine, amateur radio, CB radio
Night vision	1939 - 1940s	Nazi Germany United States	Visibility for military personnel in low light situations	Low light photography, surveillance
Duct tape	1942	United States	Sealing ammunition cases	Multiple uses
Ballistic missiles	1940s	Nazi Germany Soviet Union	Long range attack	Space exploration, launch of communication, weather and global positioning satellites
Darknet	1990s	United States	Anonymous/protected computer networking	Used by journalists, political activists, scientists, etc.
Nuclear technology	1940s	United States United Kingdom; Canada (Manhattan Project)	Nuclear weapons	Nuclear medicine, nuclear power
Jet engine	1940s	Nazi Germany (Hans von Ohain) United Kingdom (Frank Whittle)	Jet fighters, jet bombers	Airliners
Digital photography	1960s	United States Soviet Union	Spy satellites, eliminated the need to recover deorbited film canisters	Digital cameras
Compiler	1952	United States	Allow programs to be written for multiple target computers by different vendors without needing to rewrite the assembly for each of them.	Compiler
Internet	1960s - 1970s	United States (ARPANET) United Kingdom (NPL network); France (CYCLADES)	Reliable computer networking	Led to invention of the World Wide Web by British scientist Tim Berners-Lee; subsequently widespread availability of information, telecommunication and electronic commerce
Rodriguez well	1960s	United States Army	Nuclear weapons and logistics, provide water supply for bases hidden in polar regions	Colonization of Mars
Satellite navigation	1970s	United States Air Force Soviet Union	Nuclear weapons force multiplier, increased warhead accuracy through precise navigation	Navigation, personal tracking
Sanitary napkins	1920s	United Kingdom France	Prevent bleeding using cellulose in bandages.	British & American nurses picked up the bandages and started using them as Sanitary Napkins.

== See also ==
- Allied technological cooperation during World War II
- List of emerging military technologies
