= Air offensive =

Type of military operation

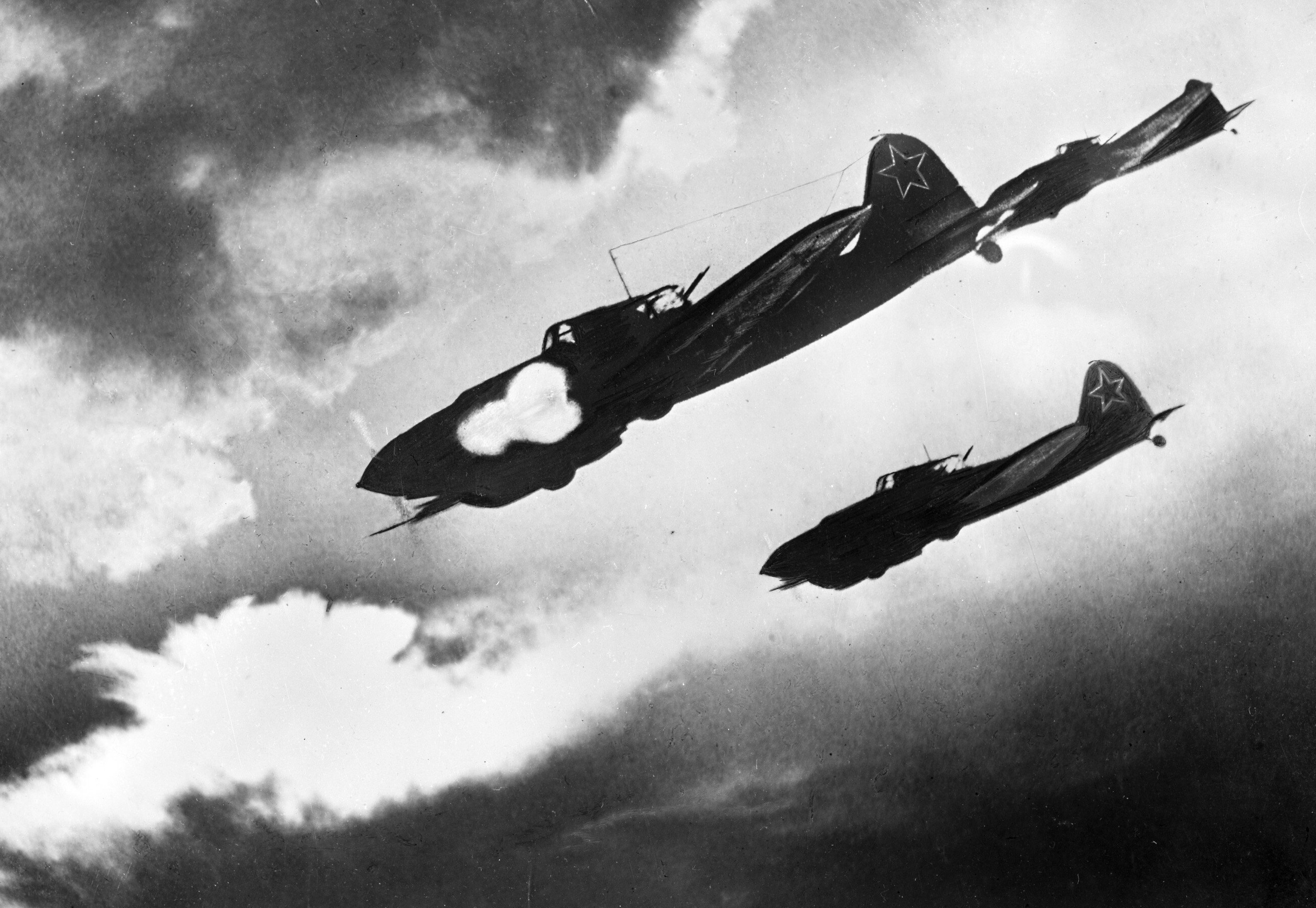
Ground attack aircraft during the Battle of Kursk

An air offensive is a type of military operation conducted using aircrew, airborne and strategic missile troops to allow securing of war, campaign or operational initiative, air-space superiority or ensure defeat of enemy forces through use of air-delivered ordnance, or destruction of enemy air, ground and naval forces.

The air offensive can be conducted by the air forces independently, or in coordination with the Land and Naval Services within the scope of Combined Operations. In some countries the air offensive can be conducted by the ground forces using aviation assets such as troop carrier operations during the Second World War or the post-war use of helicopters.

Air offensives, also known as the aviation offensives in Russian, are sometimes referred to by their principal type of aircraft or missile as the Air superiority offensive such as the Luftwaffe Operation Adlerangriff, bombing air offensive such as the Anglo-American air offensive against Germany from 1943 until the German surrender in 1945, assault air offensive as exemplified by the operations during the Battle of Kursk, and air-assault offensive such as Operation Shiny Bayonet by the 1st Cavalry Division during the Vietnam War.

Air offensives tend to be strategic in nature, with one of the largest conducted was by the Red Army Air Force, commencing in August 1943, when some 10,000 aircraft took part in the support of the Kursk Strategic Defensive, Orel Strategic Counter-offensive (Operation Kutuzov), Belgorod-Kharkov Strategic Counter-offensive (Operation Rumyantsev), Smolensk Strategic Offensive (Operation Surorov), Donbass Strategic Offensive and Chernigov-Poltava Strategic Offensive Operations.

Ordinarily the air offensive consists of three phases: air preparation of the offensive (including intelligence preparation of the battlefield), immediate preparation for the offensive, and offensive support operations.

== Sources ==
- Allen, Matthew, Military helicopter doctrines of the major powers, 1945-1992: making decisions about air-land warfare, Greenwood Press, London, 1993
- Coleman, J.D. (Maj.), editor-in-chief, The 1st Air Cavalry Division: Vietnam August 1965 to December 1969, Dia Nippon Printing Company, Tokyo, 1970
- Jackson, Robert, The Red Falcons: The Soviet Air Force in action 1919-1969, Clifton Books, London, 1970
- Kozlov, M.M., Gen. of Army, Prof., editor-in-chief, Great Patriotic War 1941-1945 encyclopaedia (in Russian), Soviet Encyclopaedia, Moscow, 1985.
- Schlight, John, Help from above: Air Force Close Air Support of the Army 1946-1973, Air Force History and Museums Program, Washington D.C., 2003
