= Charles Ardant du Picq =

French Army officer

Charles Jean Jacques Joseph Ardant du Picq
- Born: 19 October 1821; Périgueux, France
- Died: 18 August 1870 (aged 48) near Metz, France
- Allegiance: France
- Branch: French Army
- Service years: 1844–1870
- Rank: Colonel
- Conflicts: Crimean War; *Siege of Sevastopol; 1860 Lebanon conflict Franco-Prussian War; *Battle of Mars-la-Tour
- Awards: Officer of the Légion d'honneur a British medal from Queen Victoria; Médaille militaire Order of the Ottoman Medjidie, Fourth Class
- Other work: Writer

Charles Jean Jacques Joseph Ardant du Picq (19 October 1821 – 18 August 1870) was a French Army officer and military theorist of the mid-nineteenth century whose writings, as they were later interpreted by other theorists, had a great effect on French military theory and doctrine.

== Life and career ==
Ardant du Picq was born at Périgueux in the Dordogne on 19 October 1821. On 1 October 1844, upon graduation from the École spéciale militaire de Saint-Cyr, he was commissioned a sublieutenant in the 67th. As a captain, he saw action in the French expedition to Varna (April–June 1853) during the Crimean War, but he fell ill and was shipped home. Upon recovery, he rejoined his regiment in front of Sevastopol (September).

Transferred to the 9th Chasseurs a Pied battalion December 1854, he was captured during the storming of the central bastion of Sevastopol in September 1855. He was released in December 1855 and returned to active duty. As a major with the 16th Chasseur Battalion, Ardant du Picq served in Syria from August 1860 to June 1861 during the French intervention to restore order during Maronite-Druze sectarian violence.

Like virtually all his peers, he also saw extensive service in Algeria (1864–66), and in February 1869 was appointed colonel of the 10th Line Infantry Regiment. He was in France at the outbreak of war with Prussia on 15 July 1870 and took command of his regiment, the Tenth Regiment of the Line. He died on 18 August 1870 at the military hospital in Metz, from wounds received at the Battle of Mars-la-Tour.

== Battle Studies: du Picq as Military theorist ==
=== Background ===
Although comparatively little is known of his life, Ardant du Picq's small corpus of writings has earned him a place in the ranks of great military theorists. Before du Picq began his famous manuscripts, the French military relied heavily upon the writings of former Chief of Staff Baron Antoine-Henri Jomini when it came to warfare. Before his death, du Picq had already published Combat antique (ancient battle), which was later expanded from his manuscripts into the classic Etudes sur les combat: Combat antique et moderne, often referred to by its common English title as Battle Studies. This work was published in part in 1880 posthumously, and the complete text did not appear until 1902. The difficulties surrounding reform of the French military and its organization were widely discussed and his work referenced, and it was a very popular work among the army during World War I.

=== Inspirations of Battle Studies ===
As a primary inspiration to du Picq, fellow Périgueux native Marshal Thomas Bugeaud was responsible for supporting him in his calculating and objective view of military operations. Bugeaud's experiences with Marshal Suchet, a highly regarded former general of Napoleon's, left an indelible impression upon the Marshal that were handed down to du Picq. Marshal Bugeaud's aide de camp, Louis Jules Trochu, provided another inspiration with his work L'Armée Française en 1867, in which Trochu emphasized psychological difficulties in warfare.

=== Military theories ===
His principal interest was in the moral and psychological aspects of battle; as he himself wrote of the battlefields of his day: "The soldier is unknown often to his closest companions. He loses them in the disorienting smoke and confusion of a battle which he is fighting, so to speak, on his own. Cohesion is no longer ensured by mutual observation." Nor did Ardant du Picq neglect the decisive importance of modern firepower, noting that it was necessary for the attacker to "employ fire up till the last possible moment; otherwise, given modern rates of fire, no attack will reach its objective." Despite these words, much of his work was later used to help justify the doctrine of the offensive à outrance, resting somewhat on his statement that "he will win who has the resolution to advance." What separated du Picq's belief from this new idea was that while du Picq accounted for differences in enemy positions and circumstances in the art of maneuver, the offensive à outrance made no such distinction, making the offensive victorious no matter how it is employed. This stark difference from du Picq's theory was put forward principally by Colonel de Grandmaison.

== Assessment ==
In sum, Ardant du Picq was a talented analyst and, had he lived, would have gained a fine reputation as a military historian. His analyses stressed the vital importance, especially in contemporary warfare, of discipline and unit cohesion. Along with Carl von Clausewitz, he was a major influence in France after the defeat of the French army in the Franco-Prussian War, and their attention to psychological and behavioral factors in combat was judged to be supremely important. The morale aspect of warfare that du Picq encouraged was propagated later by the writings of Marshal Ferdinand Foch, in which he also concluded that technological advances could not change the human condition and how men react to warfare.
