= Military =

Organized force intended for warfare

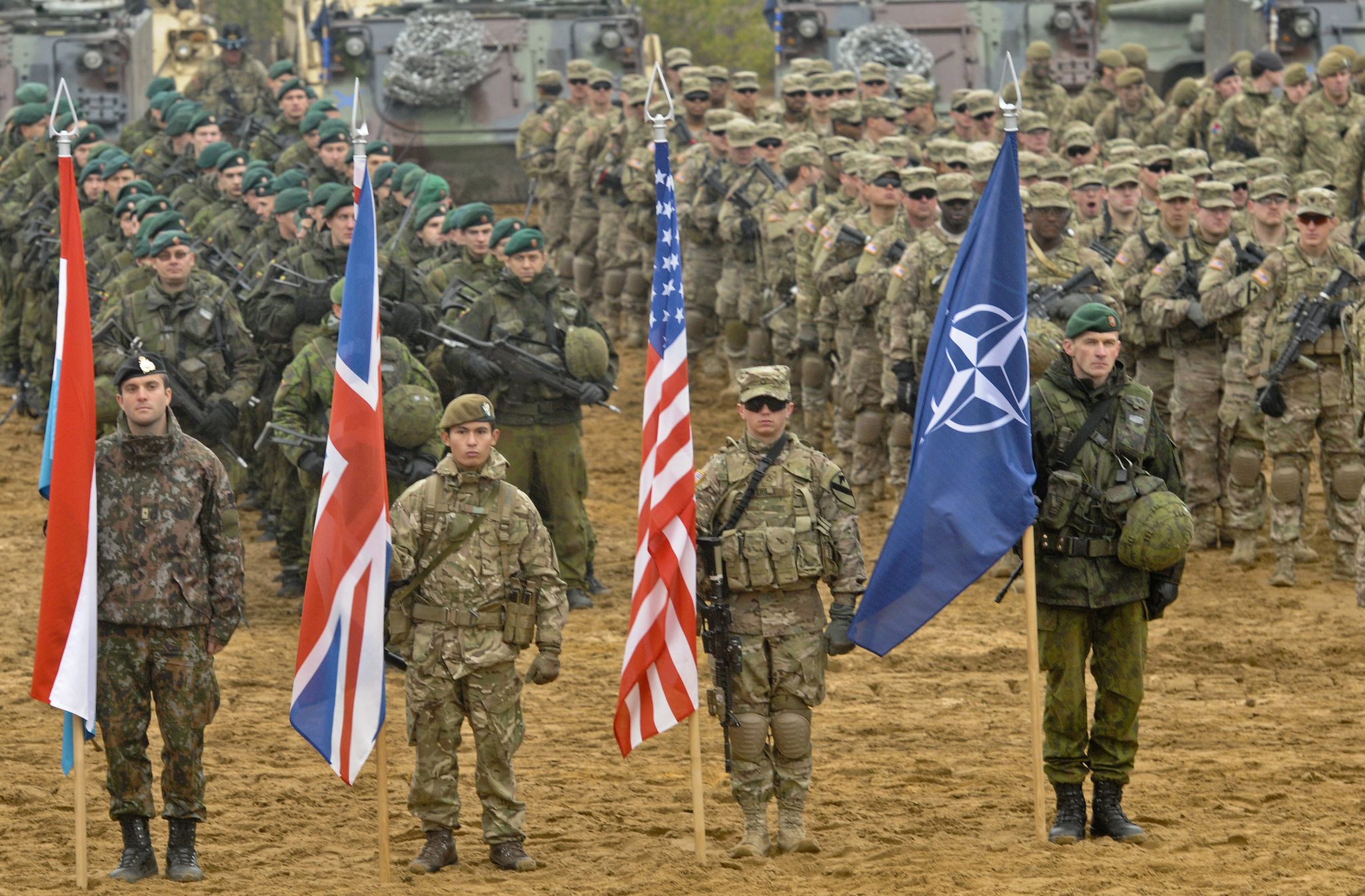
NATO military ceremony in Pabradė, Lithuania, November 2014

A military, also known collectively as armed forces, is a heavily armed, highly organized force primarily intended for warfare. Militaries are typically authorized and maintained by a sovereign state, with their members identifiable by a distinct military uniform. They may consist of one or more military branches such as an army, navy, air force, space force, marines, or coast guard. The main task of a military is usually defined as defence of their state and its interests against external armed threats.

In broad usage, the terms "armed forces" and "military" are often synonymous, although in technical usage a distinction is sometimes made in which a country's armed forces may include other paramilitary forces such as armed police.

Countries by number of active soldiers (2009)

Beyond warfare, the military may be employed in additional sanctioned and non-sanctioned functions within the state, including internal security threats, crowd control, promotion of political agendas, emergency services and reconstruction, protecting corporate economic interests, social ceremonies, and national honour guards. A nation's military may function as a discrete social subculture, with dedicated infrastructure such as military housing, schools, utilities, logistics, hospitals, legal services, food production, finance, and banking services.

The profession of soldiering is older than recorded history. Some images of classical antiquity portray the power and feats of military leaders. The Battle of Kadesh in 1274 BC from the reign of Ramses II features in bas-relief monuments. The first Emperor of a unified China, Qin Shi Huang, created the Terracotta Army to represent his military might. The Ancient Romans wrote many treatises and writings on warfare, as well as many decorated triumphal arches and victory columns.

== Etymology and definitions ==
The first recorded use of the word "military" in English, spelled militarie, was in 1582. It comes from the Latin militaris (from Latin miles 'soldier') through French, but is of uncertain etymology, one suggestion being derived from *mil-it- – going in a body or mass.

As a noun phrase, "the military" usually refers generally to a country's armed forces, or sometimes, more specifically, to the senior officers who command them. In general, it refers to the physicality of armed forces, their personnel, equipment, and the physical area which they occupy.

As an adjective, military originally referred only to soldiers and soldiering, but it broadened to apply to land forces in general, and anything to do with their profession. The names of both the Royal Military Academy (1741) and United States Military Academy (1802) reflect this. However, at about the time of the Napoleonic Wars, military began to be used in reference to armed forces as a whole, such as "military service", "military intelligence", and "military history". As such, it now connotes any activity performed by armed force personnel.

== History ==
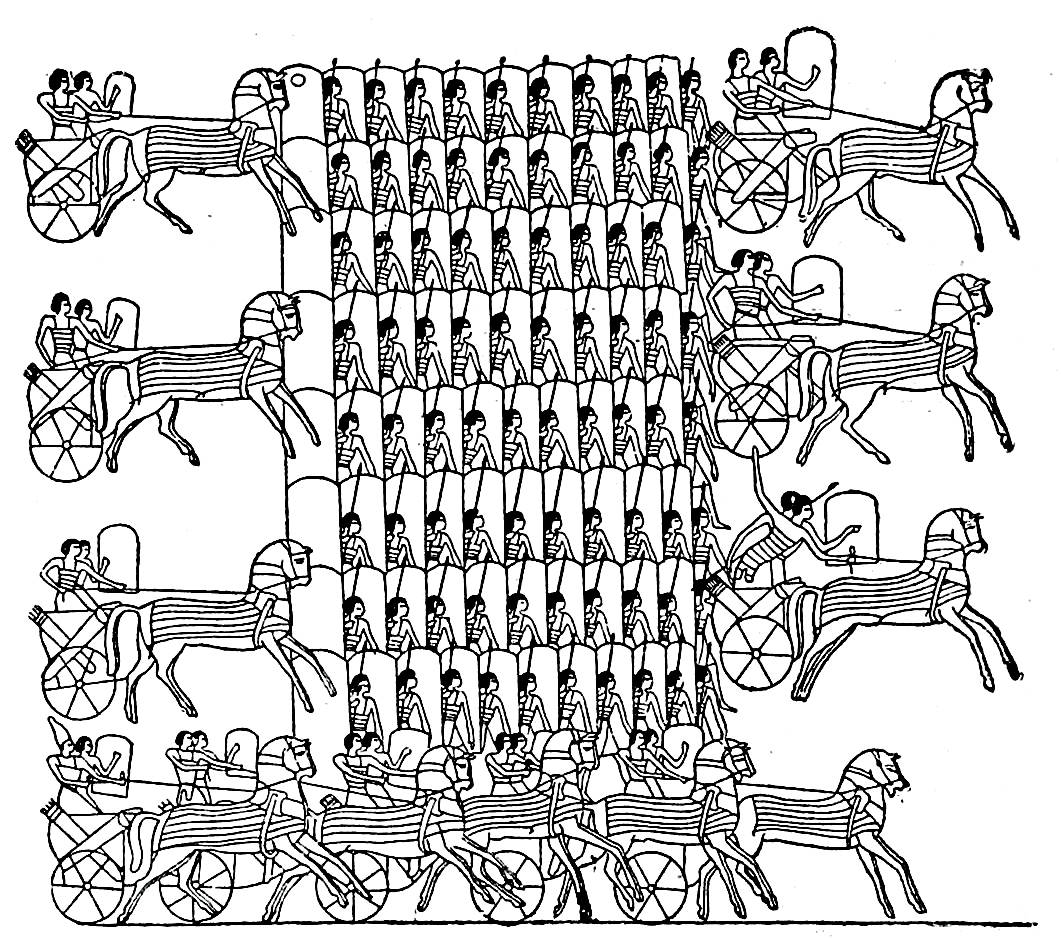
Depiction of ancient Egyptian military formation

Military history is often considered to be the history of all conflicts, not just the history of the state militaries. It differs somewhat from the history of war, with military history focusing on the people and institutions of war-making, while the history of war focuses on the evolution of war itself in the face of changing technology, governments, and geography.

Military history has a number of facets. One main facet is to learn from past accomplishments and mistakes, so as to more effectively wage war in the future. Another is to create a sense of military tradition, which is used to create cohesive military forces. Still, another is to learn to prevent wars more effectively. Human knowledge about the military is largely based on both recorded and oral history of military conflicts (war), their participating armies and navies and, more recently, air forces.

== Organization ==
=== Personnel and units ===
Despite the growing importance of military technology, military activity depends above all on people. For example, in 2000 the British Army declared: "Man is still the first weapon of war."

==== Rank and role ====
The military organization is characterized by a command hierarchy divided by military rank, with ranks normally grouped (in descending order of authority) as officers (e.g. colonel), non-commissioned officers (e.g. sergeant), and personnel at the lowest rank (e.g. private). While senior officers make strategic decisions, subordinated military personnel (soldiers, sailors, marines, or airmen) fulfil them. Although rank titles vary by military branch and country, the rank hierarchy is common to all state armed forces worldwide.

In addition to their rank, personnel occupy one of many trade roles, which are often grouped according to the nature of the role's military tasks on combat operations: combat roles (e.g. infantry), combat support roles (e.g. combat engineers), and combat service support roles (e.g. logistical support).

==== Recruitment ====
Personnel may be recruited or conscripted, depending on the system chosen by the state. Most military personnel are males; the minority proportion of female personnel varies internationally (approximately 3% in India, 10% in the UK, 13% in Sweden, 16% in the US, and 27% in South Africa). While two-thirds of states now recruit or conscript only adults, as of 2017 50 states still relied partly on children under the age of 18 (usually aged 16 or 17) to staff their armed forces.

Whereas recruits who join as officers tend to be upwardly-mobile, most enlisted personnel have a childhood background of relative socio-economic deprivation. For example, after the US suspended conscription in 1973, "the military disproportionately attracted African American men, men from lower-status socioeconomic backgrounds, men who had been in nonacademic high school programs, and men whose high school grades tended to be low". However, a study released in 2020 on the socio-economic backgrounds of U.S. Armed Forces personnel suggests that they are at parity or slightly higher than the civilian population with respect to socio-economic indicators such as parental income, parental wealth and cognitive abilities. The study found that technological, tactical, operational and doctrinal changes have led to a change in the demand for personnel. Furthermore, the study suggests that the most disadvantaged socio-economic groups are less likely to meet the requirements of the modern U.S. military.

==== Obligations ====
The obligations of military employment are many. Full-time military employment normally requires a minimum period of service of several years; between two and six years is typical of armed forces in Australia, the UK and the US, for example, depending on role, branch, and rank. Some armed forces allow a short discharge window, normally during training, when recruits may leave the armed force as of right. Alternatively, part-time military employment, known as reserve service, allows a recruit to maintain a civilian job while training under military discipline at weekends; he or she may be called out to deploy on operations to supplement the full-time personnel complement. After leaving the armed forces, recruits may remain liable for compulsory return to full-time military employment in order to train or deploy on operations.

Military law introduces offences not recognized by civilian courts, such as absence without leave (AWOL), desertion, political acts, malingering, behaving disrespectfully, and disobedience (see, for example, offences against military law in the United Kingdom). Penalties range from a summary reprimand to imprisonment for several years following a court martial. Certain rights are also restricted or suspended, including the freedom of association (e.g. union organizing) and freedom of speech (speaking to the media). Military personnel in some countries have a right of conscientious objection if they believe an order is immoral or unlawful, or cannot in good conscience carry it out.

Personnel may be posted to bases in their home country or overseas, according to operational need, and may be deployed from those bases on exercises or operations. During peacetime, when military personnel are generally stationed in garrisons or other permanent military facilities, they conduct administrative tasks, training and education activities, technology maintenance, and recruitment.

==== Training ====
Initial training conditions recruits for the demands of military life, including preparedness to injure and kill other people, and to face mortal danger without fleeing. It is a physically and psychologically intensive process which resocializes recruits for the unique nature of military demands. For example:

- Individuality is suppressed (e.g. by shaving the head of new recruits, issuing uniforms, denying privacy, and prohibiting the use of first names);
- Daily routine is tightly controlled (e.g. recruits must make their beds, polish boots, and stack their clothes in a certain way, and mistakes are punished);
- Continuous stressors deplete psychological resistance to the demands of their instructors (e.g. depriving recruits of sleep, food, or shelter, shouting insults and giving orders intended to humiliate)
- Frequent punishments serve to condition group conformity and discourage poor performance;
- The disciplined drill instructor is presented as a role model of the ideal soldier.

=== Intelligence ===
The next requirement comes as a fairly basic need for the military to identify possible threats it may be called upon to face. For this purpose, some of the commanding forces and other military, as well as often civilian personnel participate in identification of these threats. This is at once an organization, a system and a process collectively called military intelligence (MI). Areas of study in Military intelligence may include the operational environment, hostile, friendly and neutral forces, the civilian population in an area of combat operations, and other broader areas of interest.

The difficulty in using military intelligence concepts and military intelligence methods is in the nature of the secrecy of the information they seek, and the clandestine nature that intelligence operatives work in obtaining what may be plans for a conflict escalation, initiation of combat, or an invasion.

An important part of the military intelligence role is the military analysis performed to assess military capability of potential future aggressors, and provide combat modelling that helps to understand factors on which comparison of forces can be made. This helps to quantify and qualify such statements as: "China and India maintain the largest armed forces in the World" or that "the U.S. Military is considered to be the world's strongest".

Although some groups engaged in combat, such as militants or resistance movements, refer to themselves using military terminology, notably 'Army' or 'Front', none have had the structure of a national military to justify the reference, and usually have had to rely on support of outside national militaries. They also use these terms to conceal from the MI their true capabilities, and to impress potential ideological recruits.

Having military intelligence representatives participate in the execution of the national defence policy is important, because it becomes the first respondent and commentator on the policy expected strategic goal, compared to the realities of identified threats. When the intelligence reporting is compared to the policy, it becomes possible for the national leadership to consider allocating resources over and above the officers and their subordinates military pay, and the expense of maintaining military facilities and military support services for them.

=== Budget ===
Further information: List of countries with highest military expenditures

Military spending, top 25 countries by % GDP, 2024
Country	% GDP spent on military
Ukraine	34.5
Israel	8.8
Algeria	8.0
Saudi Arabia	7.3
Russia	7.1
Myanmar	6.8
Oman	5.6
Armenia	5.5
Azerbaijan	5.0
Kuwait	4.8
Jordan	4.8
Burkina Faso	4.7
Mali	4.2
Poland	4.2
Burundi	3.8
Brunei	3.6
Morocco	3.5
United States	3.4
Estonia	3.4
Colombia	3.4
Latvia	3.3
Greece	3.1
Lithuania	3.1
Chad	3.0
Kyrgyzstan	3.0

Military spending, top 25 countries by PPP, 2024
Country	$billions spent on military
United States	997
China	567
Russia	401
India	308
Ukraine	183
South Korea	96
Germany	99
Japan	91
France	91
United Kingdom	86
Brazil	64
Poland	62
Italy	60
Turkey	59
Indonesia	47
Colombia	43
Mexico	40
Spain	39
Australia	31
Canada	31
Netherlands	21
Philippines	21
Romania	21
Greece	17
Malaysia	14

Defense economics is the financial and monetary efforts made to resource and sustain militaries, and to finance military operations, including war.

The process of allocating resources is conducted by determining a military budget, which is administered by a military finance organization within the military. Military procurement is then authorized to purchase or contract provision of goods and services to the military, whether in peacetime at a permanent base, or in a combat zone from local population.

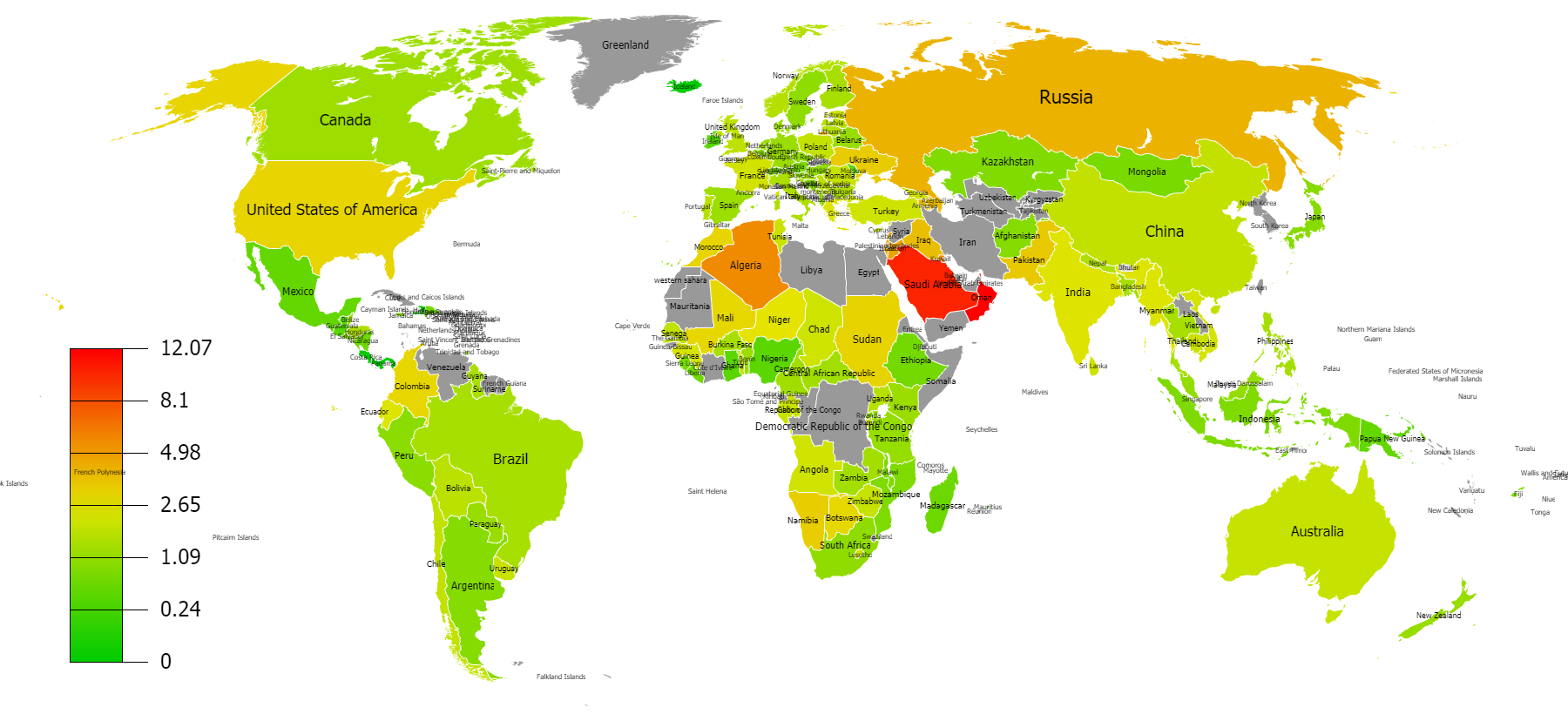
Map of military expenditures as a percentage of GDP by country, 2017

History of military budgets by country

=== Capability development ===
Capability development, which is often referred to as the military 'strength', is arguably one of the most complex activities known to humanity; because it requires determining: strategic, operational, and tactical capability requirements to counter the identified threats; strategic, operational, and tactical doctrines by which the acquired capabilities will be used; identifying concepts, methods, and systems involved in executing the doctrines; creating design specifications for the manufacturers who would produce these in adequate quantity and quality for their use in combat; purchase the concepts, methods, and systems; create a forces structure that would use the concepts, methods, and systems most effectively and efficiently; integrate these concepts, methods, and systems into the force structure by providing military education, training, and practice that preferably resembles combat environment of intended use; create military logistics systems to allow continued and uninterrupted performance of military organizations under combat conditions, including provision of health services to the personnel, and maintenance for the equipment; the services to assist recovery of wounded personnel, and repair of damaged equipment; and finally, post-conflict demobilization, and disposal of war stocks surplus to peacetime requirements.

Development of military doctrine is perhaps the most important of all capability development activities, because it determines how military forces are used in conflicts, the concepts and methods used by the command to employ appropriately military skilled, armed and equipped personnel in achievement of the tangible goals and objectives of the war, campaign, battle, engagement, and action. The line between strategy and tactics is not easily blurred, although deciding which is being discussed had sometimes been a matter of personal judgement by some commentators, and military historians. The use of forces at the level of organization between strategic and tactical is called operational mobility.

Complacency and inaccurate capability perceptions can reduce combat effectiveness.

=== Science ===
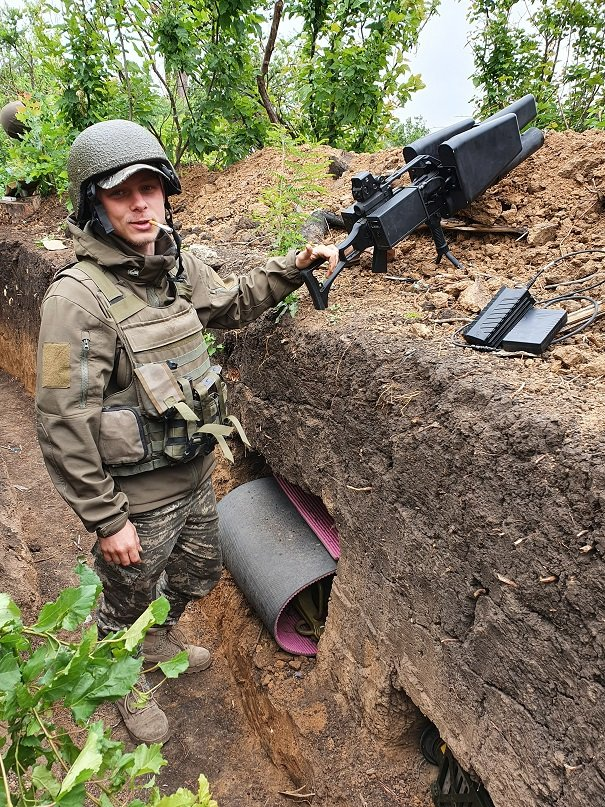
A frontline Ukrainian soldier with an anti-drone rifle, which uses directed energy to disable its target. The mainstream use of drone technology in the Russian invasion of Ukraine led to a need to research, develop and deploy effective counter-measures.

Because most of the concepts and methods used by the military, and many of its systems are not found in commercial branches, much of the material is researched, designed, developed, and offered for inclusion in arsenals by military science organizations within the overall structure of the military. Therefore, military scientists can be found interacting with all Arms and Services of the armed forces, and at all levels of the military hierarchy of command.

Although concerned with research into military psychology, particularly combat stress and how it affects troop morale, often the bulk of military science activities is directed at military intelligence technology, military communications, and improving military capability through research. The design, development, and prototyping of weapons, military support equipment, and military technology in general, is also an area in which much effort is invested – it includes everything from global communication networks and aircraft carriers to paint and food.

=== Logistics ===
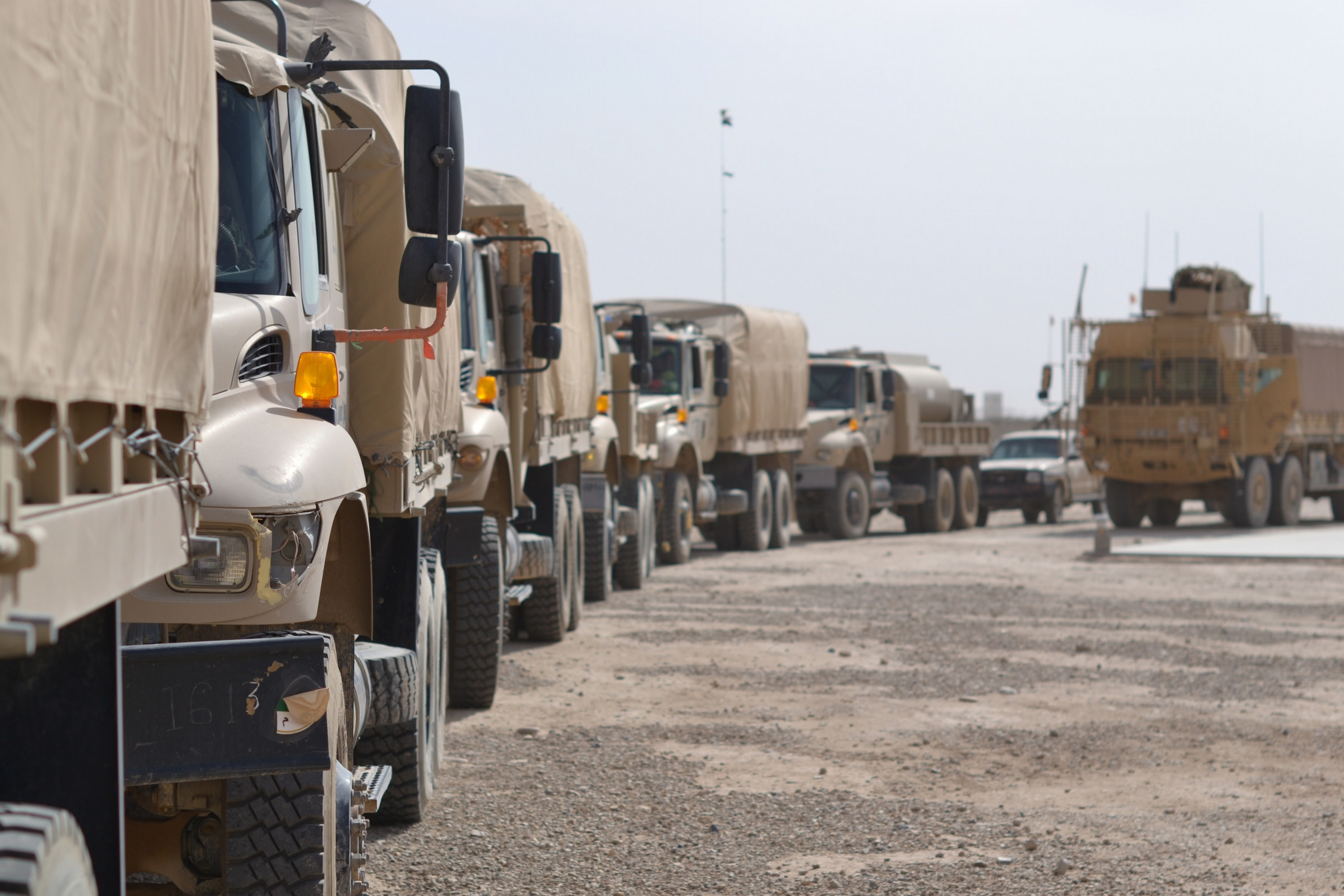
Afghan and British military cargo trucks preparing a convoy to resupply a forward operating base in Afghanistan, 2011

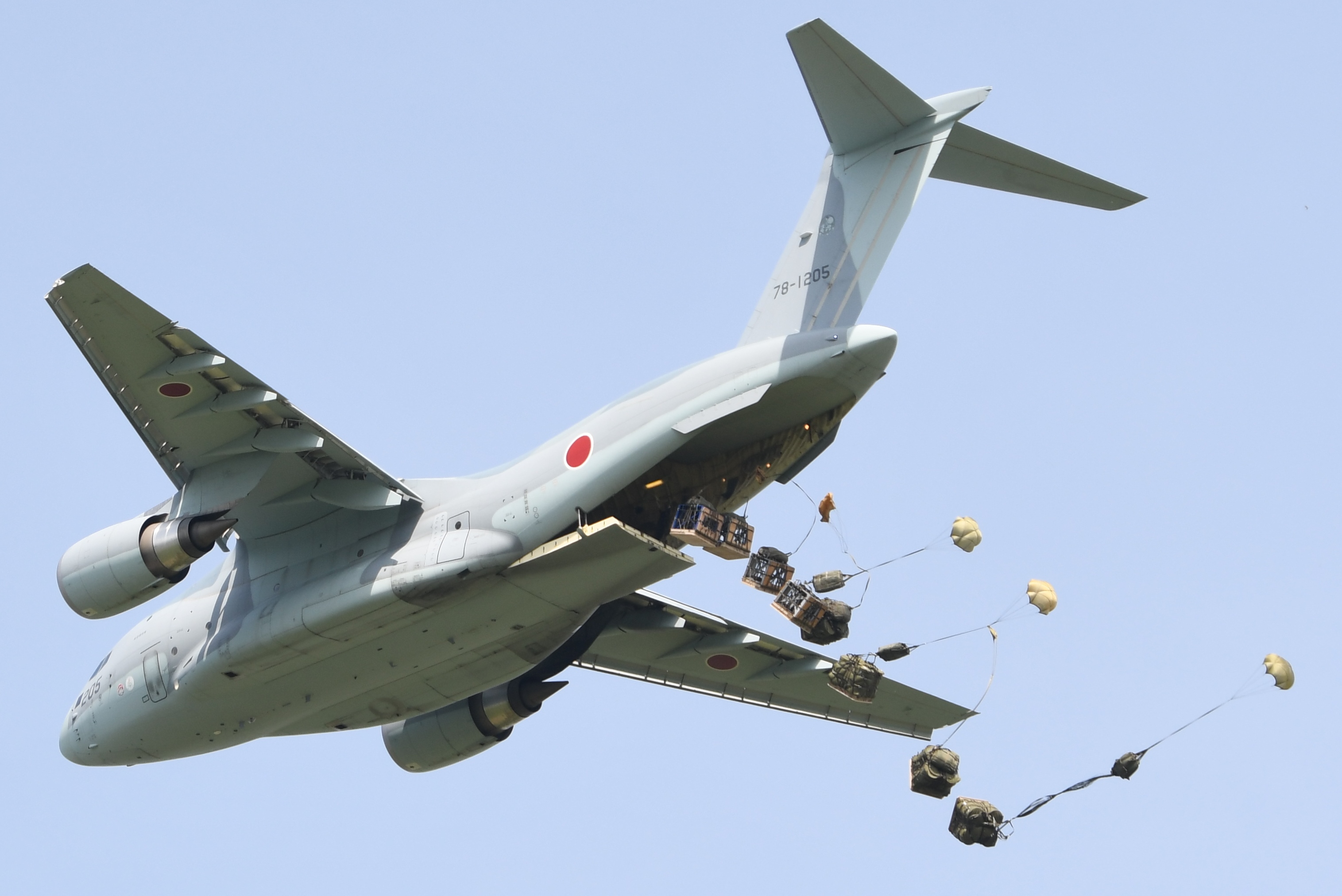
A Japan Air Self-Defense Force Kawasaki C-2 military transport aircraft conducting an airdrop demonstration over Miho Air Base, 2018

Possessing military capability is not sufficient if this capability cannot be deployed for, and employed in combat operations. To achieve this, military logistics are used for the logistics management and logistics planning of the forces military supply chain management, the consumables, and capital equipment of the troops.

Although mostly concerned with the military transport, as a means of delivery using different modes of transport; from military trucks, to container ships operating from permanent military base, it also involves creating field supply dumps at the rear of the combat zone, and even forward supply points in a specific unit's tactical area of responsibility.

These supply points are also used to provide military engineering services, such as the recovery of defective and derelict vehicles and weapons, maintenance of weapons in the field, the repair and field modification of weapons and equipment; and in peacetime, the life-extension programmes undertaken to allow continued use of equipment. One of the most important role of logistics is the supply of munitions as a primary type of consumable, their storage, and disposal.

== In combat ==
The primary reason for the existence of the military is to engage in combat, should it be required to do so by the national defence policy, and to win. This represents an organisational goal of any military, and the primary focus for military thought through military history. How victory is achieved, and what shape it assumes, is studied by most, if not all, military groups on three levels.

=== Strategic victory ===
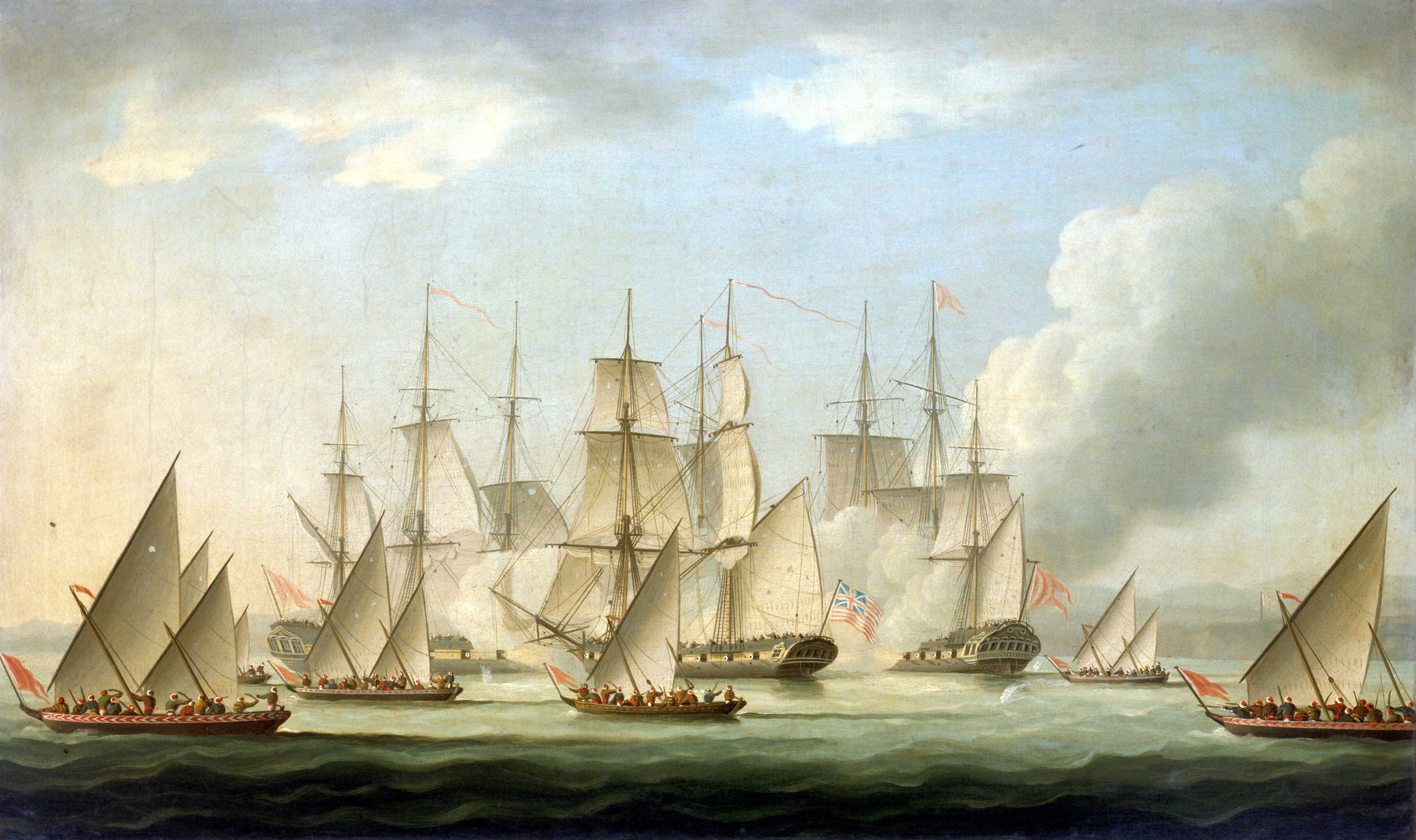
The Maratha Navy, which is considered to be the foundation of the modern Indian Navy, often employed land and sea coordination tactics when attacking, which won them many battles against the Mughals and Portuguese

Military strategy is the management of forces in wars and military campaigns by a commander-in-chief, employing large military forces, either national and allied as a whole, or the component elements of armies, navies and air forces; such as army groups, naval fleets, and large numbers of aircraft. Military strategy is a long-term projection of belligerents' policy, with a broad view of outcome implications, including outside the concerns of military command. Military strategy is more concerned with the supply of war and planning, than management of field forces and combat between them. The scope of strategic military planning can span weeks, but is more often months or even years.

=== Operational victory ===
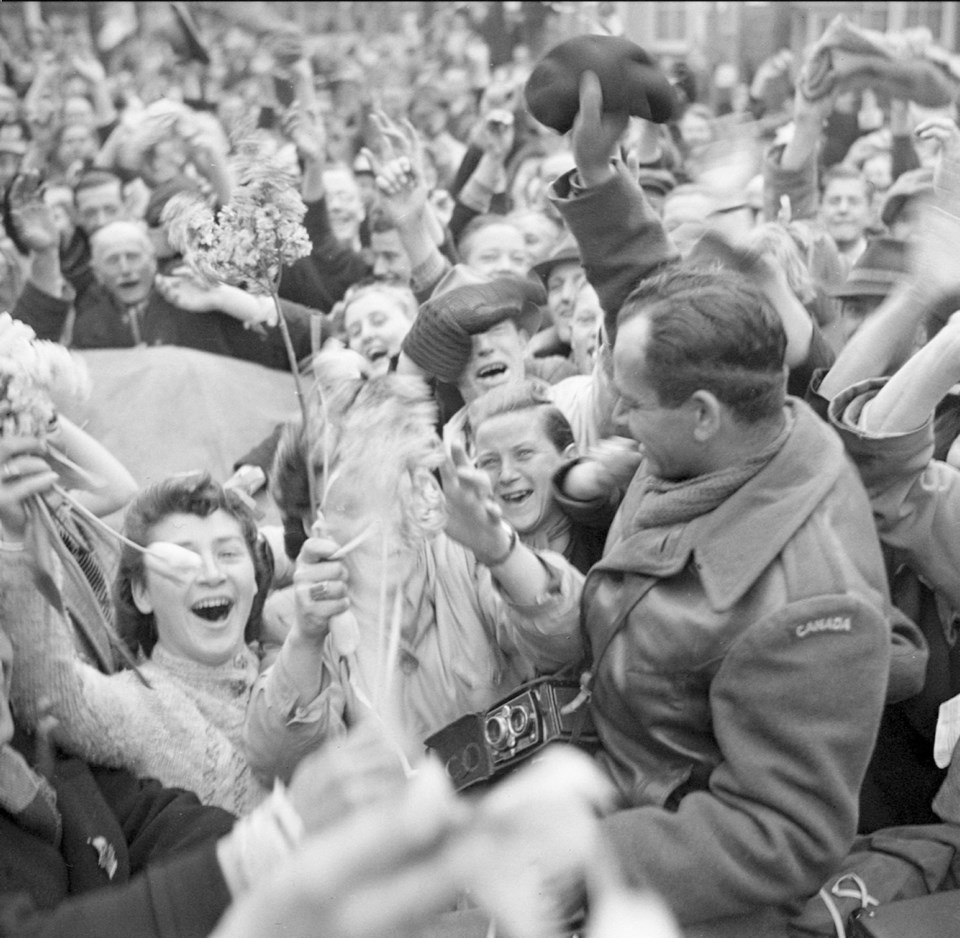
Dutch civilians celebrating the arrival of the I Canadian Corps in Utrecht as the Canadian Army liberates the Netherlands from Nazi occupation

Operational mobility is, within warfare and military doctrine, the level of command which coordinates the minute details of tactics with the overarching goals of strategy. A common synonym is operational art.

The operational level is at a scale bigger than one where line of sight and the time of day are important, and smaller than the strategic level, where production and politics are considerations. Formations are of the operational level if they are able to conduct operations on their own, and are of sufficient size to be directly handled or have a significant impact at the strategic level. This concept was pioneered by the German army prior to and during the Second World War. At this level, planning and duration of activities takes from one week to a month, and are executed by Field Armies and Army Corps and their naval and air equivalents.

=== Tactical victory ===
Military tactics concerns itself with the methods for engaging and defeating the enemy in direct combat. Military tactics are usually used by units over hours or days, and are focused on the specific tasks and objectives of squadrons, companies, battalions, regiments, brigades, and divisions, and their naval and air force equivalents.

One of the oldest military publications is The Art of War, by the Chinese philosopher Sun Tzu. Written in the 6th century BCE, the 13-chapter book is intended as military instruction, and not as military theory, but has had a huge influence on Asian military doctrine, and from the late 19th century, on European and United States military planning. It has even been used to formulate business tactics, and can even be applied in social and political areas.

Battle formation and tactics of Macedon

The Classical Greeks and the Romans wrote prolifically on military campaigning. Among the best-known Roman works are Julius Caesar's commentaries on the Gallic Wars, and the Roman Civil war – written about 50 BC.

Two major works on tactics come from the late Roman period: Taktike Theoria by Aelianus Tacticus, and De Re Militari ('On military matters') by Vegetius. Taktike Theoria examined Greek military tactics, and was most influential in the Byzantine world and during the Golden Age of Islam.

De Re Militari formed the basis of European military tactics until the late 17th century. Perhaps its most enduring maxim is Igitur qui desiderat pacem, praeparet bellum (let he who desires peace prepare for war).

Due to the changing nature of combat with the introduction of artillery in the European Middle Ages, and infantry firearms in the Renaissance, attempts were made to define and identify those strategies, grand tactics, and tactics that would produce a victory more often than that achieved by the Romans in praying to the gods before the battle.

Later this became known as military science, and later still, would adopt the scientific method approach to the conduct of military operations under the influence of the Industrial Revolution thinking. In his seminal book On War, the Prussian Major-General and leading expert on modern military strategy, Carl von Clausewitz defined military strategy as 'the employment of battles to gain the end of war'. According to Clausewitz:

strategy forms the plan of the War, and to this end it links together the series of acts which are to lead to the final decision, that is to say, it makes the plans for the separate campaigns and regulates the combats to be fought in each.

Hence, Clausewitz placed political aims above military goals, ensuring civilian control of the military. Military strategy was one of a triumvirate of 'arts' or 'sciences' that governed the conduct of warfare, the others being: military tactics, the execution of plans and manoeuvring of forces in battle, and maintenance of an army.

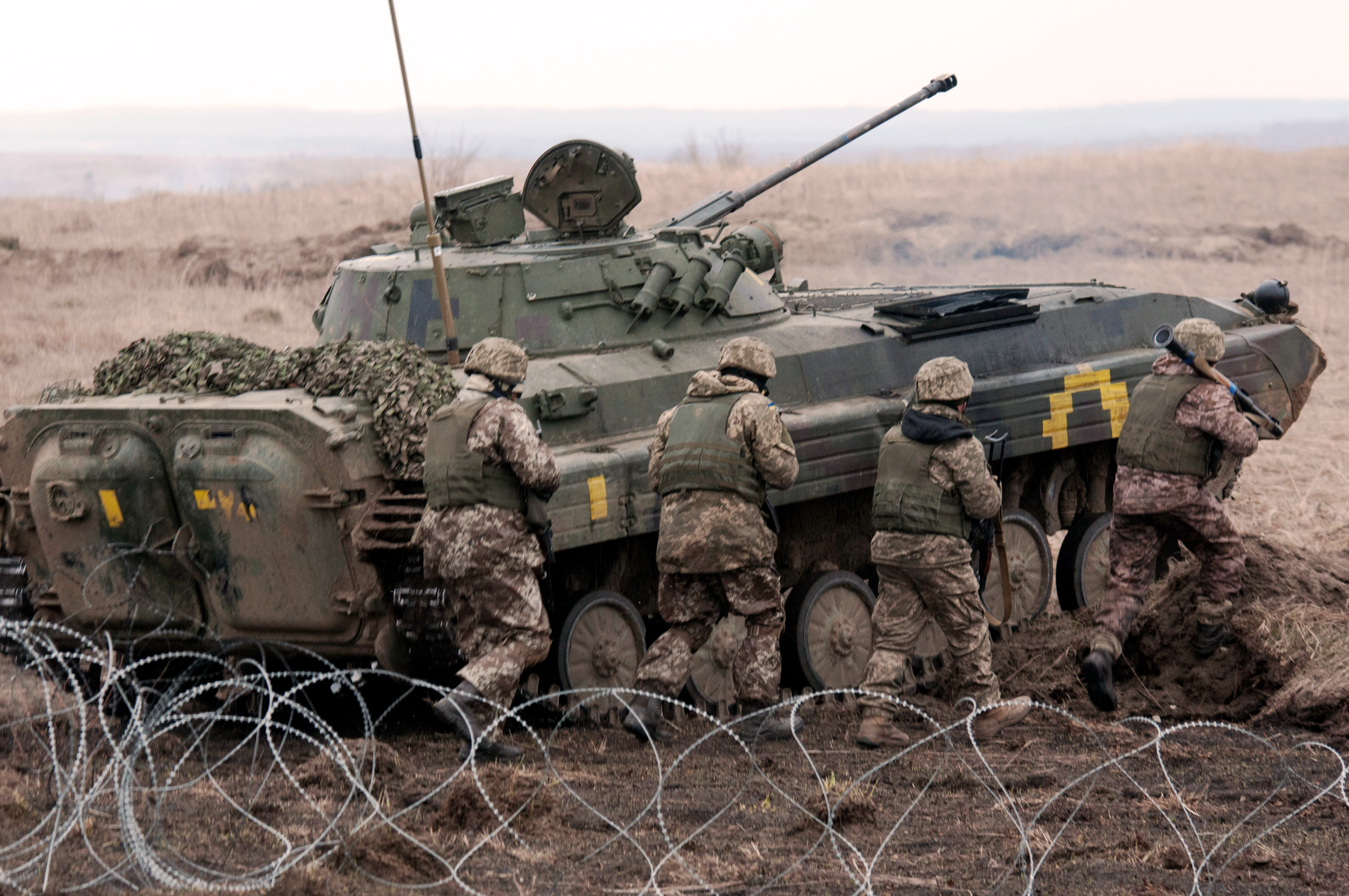
Armed Forces of Ukraine soldiers conducting combined arms tactics training with a BMP-2 IFV

The meaning of military tactics has changed over time; from the deployment and manoeuvring of entire land armies on the fields of ancient battles, and galley fleets; to modern use of small unit ambushes, encirclements, bombardment attacks, frontal assaults, air assaults, hit-and-run tactics used mainly by guerrilla forces, and, in some cases, suicide attacks on land and at sea. Evolution of aerial warfare introduced its own air combat tactics. Often, military deception, in the form of military camouflage or misdirection using decoys, is used to confuse the enemy as a tactic.

A major development in infantry tactics came with the increased use of trench warfare in the 19th and 20th centuries. This was mainly employed in World War I in the Gallipoli campaign, and the Western Front. Trench warfare often turned to a stalemate, only broken by a large loss of life, because, in order to attack an enemy entrenchment, soldiers had to run through an exposed 'no man's land' under heavy fire from their opposing entrenched enemy.

== Technology ==
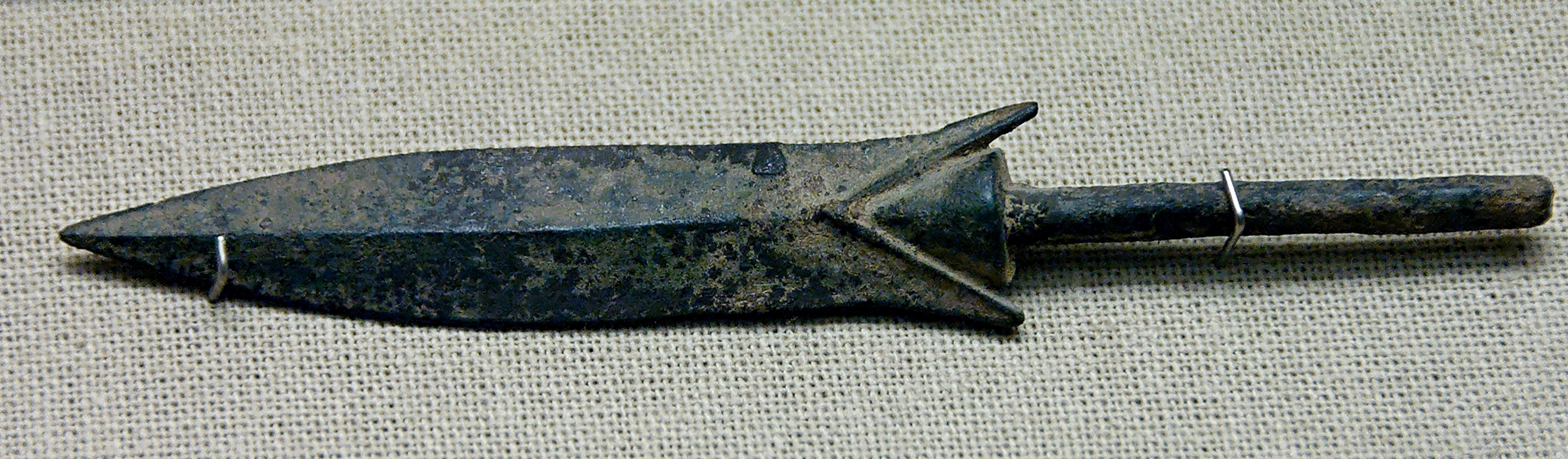
A bronze arrowhead from the 4th century BCE, found in Olynthus, Chalkidiki, Greece

As with any occupation, since ancient times, the military has been distinguished from other members of the society by their tools: the weapons and military equipment used in combat. When Stone Age humans first took flint to tip the spear, it was the first example of applying technology to improve the weapon. Since then, the advances made by human societies, and that of weapons, has been closely linked. Stone weapons gave way to Bronze Age and Iron Age weapons such as swords and shields. With each technological change was realized some tangible increase in military capability, such as through greater effectiveness of a sharper edge in defeating armour, or improved density of materials used in manufacture of weapons.

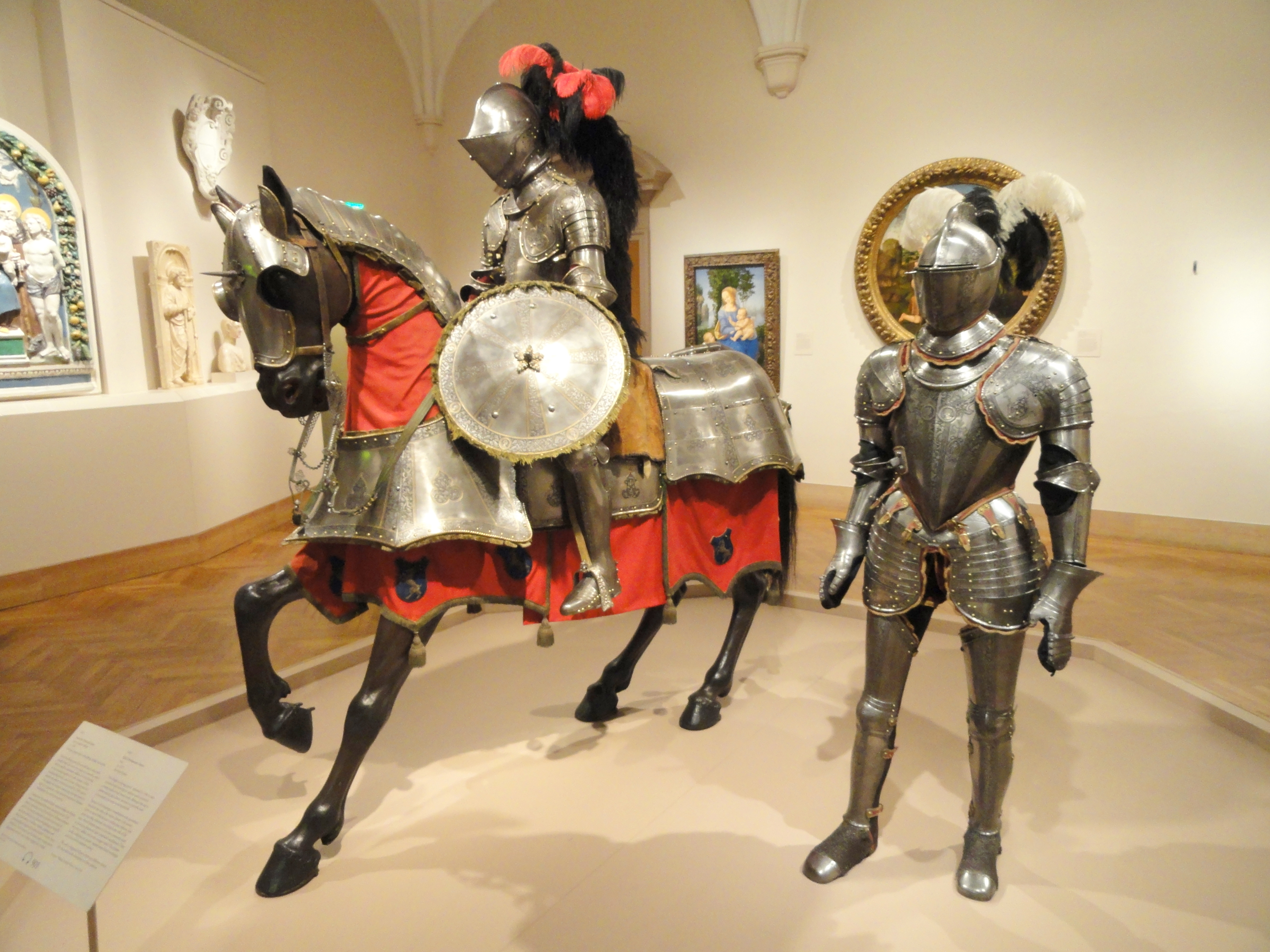
A mounted knight and a foot knight in full plate armour. Armour and cavalry dominated the battlefield until the invention of firearms

On land, the first significant technological advance in warfare was the development of ranged weapons, notably the sling and later the bow and arrow. The next significant advance came with the domestication of the horses and mastering of equestrianism, creating cavalry and allowing for faster military advances and better logistics. Possibly the most significant advancement was the wheel, a staple of transportation, starting with the chariot and eventually siege engines. The bow was manufactured in increasingly larger and more powerful versions to increase both the weapon range and armour penetration performance, developing into composite bows, recurve bows, longbows, and crossbows. These proved particularly useful during the rise of cavalry, as horsemen encased in ever-more sophisticated armour came to dominate the battlefield. The most advanced form of steel armour was full plate armour. It encased the wearer in a suit of steel and was designed to allow the joints and muscles to move as freely as possible and thereby maintain their harmonious reciprocal relationship. This meant that the reduction to the wearer's agility due to carrying the weight of the armour was minimised while protection was maximised.

In medieval China, gunpowder had been invented, and was increasingly used by the military in combat. The use of gunpowder in the early vase-like mortars in Europe, and advanced versions of the longbow and crossbow with armour-piercing arrowheads, put an end to the dominance of the armoured knight. Gunpowder resulted in the development and fielding of the musket, which could be used effectively with little training. In time, the successors to muskets and cannons, in the form of rifles and artillery, would become core battlefield technology.

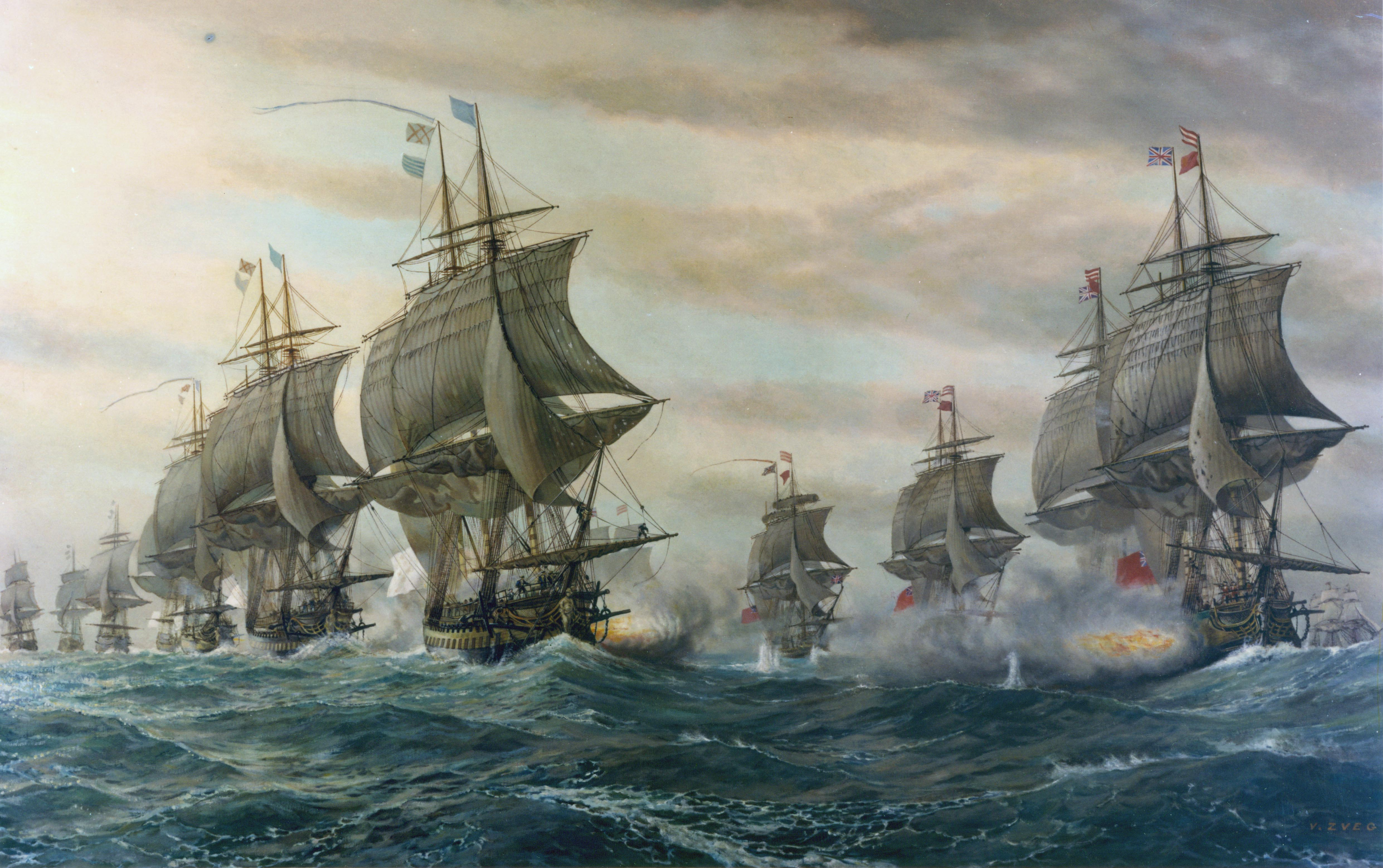
Naval vessels of France and Britain exchanging fire during the 1781 Battle of the Chesapeake

As the speed of technological advances accelerated in civilian applications, so too did military and warfare become industrialized. The newly invented machine gun and repeating rifle redefined firepower on the battlefield, and, in part, explains the high casualty rates of the American Civil War and the decline of melee combat in warfare. The next breakthrough was the conversion of artillery parks from the muzzle-loading guns, to quicker breech-loading guns with recoiling barrels that allowed quicker aimed fire and use of a shield. The widespread introduction of low smoke (smokeless) propellant powders since the 1880s also allowed for a great improvement of artillery ranges. The development of breech loading had the greatest effect on naval warfare for the first time since the Middle Ages, altering the way weapons are mounted on warships. Naval tactics were divorced from the reliance on sails with the invention of the internal combustion. A further advance in military naval technology was the submarine and the torpedo.

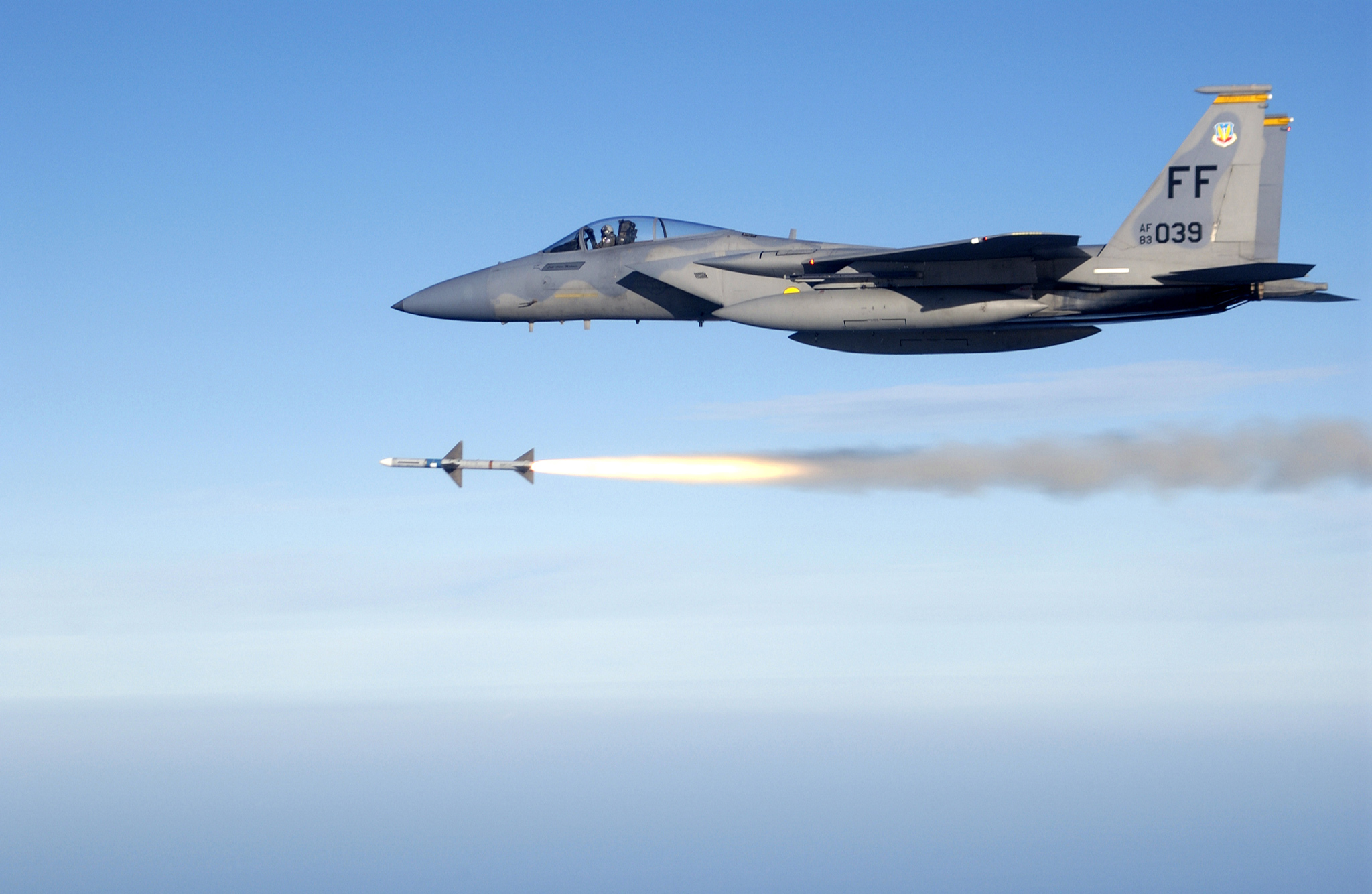
AIM-7 Sparrow medium range air-to-air missile from an F-15 Eagle

During World War I, the need to break the deadlock of trench warfare saw the rapid development of many new technologies, particularly tanks. Military aviation was extensively used, and bombers became decisive in many battles of World War II, which marked the most frantic period of weapons development in history. Many new designs, and concepts were used in combat, and all existing technologies of warfare were improved between 1939 and 1945.

During World War II, significant advances were made in military communications through increased use of radio, military intelligence through use of the radar, and in military medicine through use of penicillin, while in the air, the guided missile, jet aircraft, and helicopters were seen for the first time. Perhaps the most infamous of all military technologies was the creation of nuclear weapons, although the exact effects of its radiation were unknown until the early 1950s. Far greater use of military vehicles had finally eliminated the cavalry from the military force structure. After World War II, with the onset of the Cold War, the constant technological development of new weapons was institutionalized, as participants engaged in a constant arms race in capability development. This constant state of weapons development continues into the present. Main battle tanks, and other heavy equipment such as armoured fighting vehicles, military aircraft, and ships, are characteristic to organized military forces.

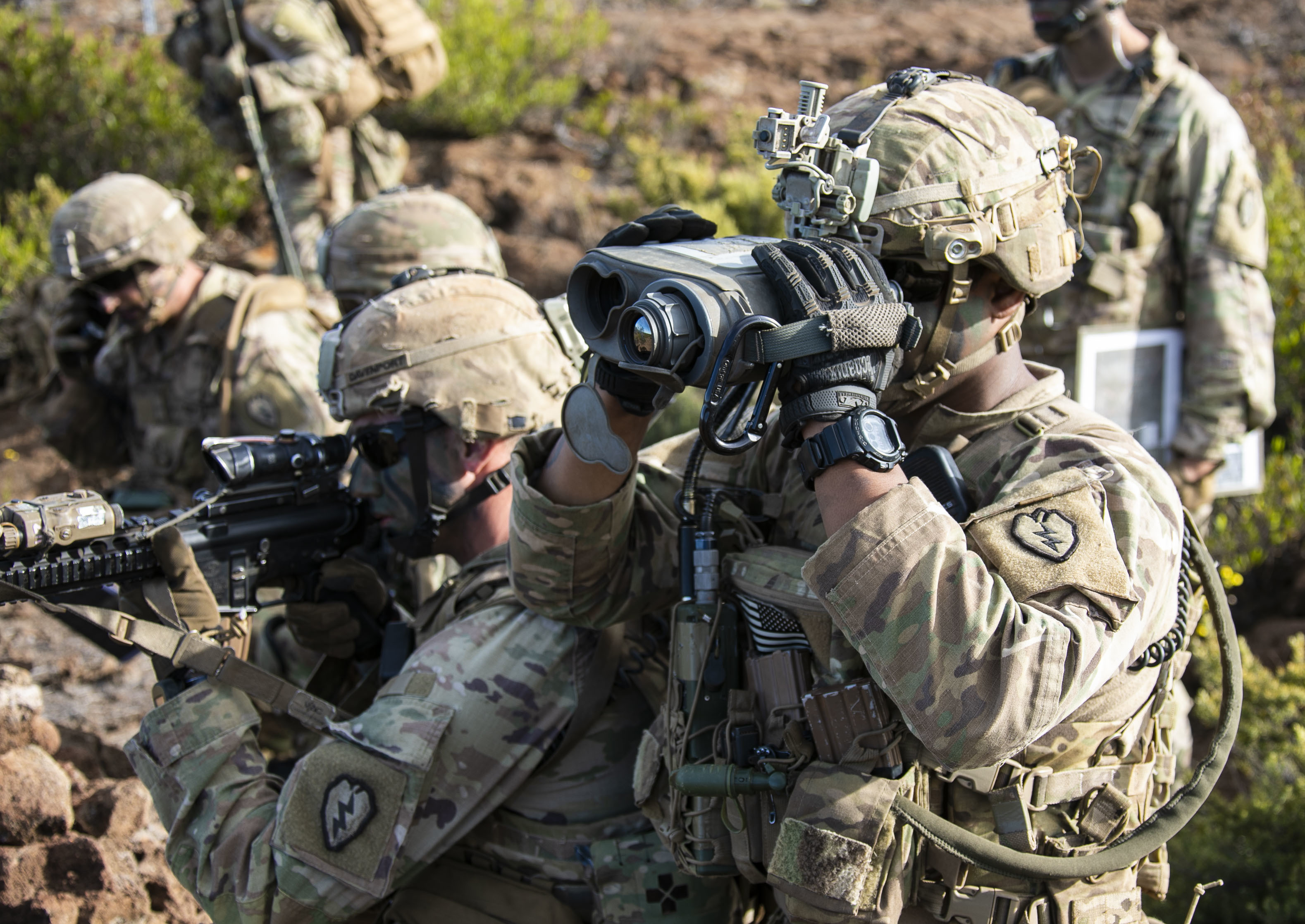
U.S. Army soldiers with modern equipment. The soldier on the right is using a laser designator to observe and mark targets, while the soldier on the far left is using a radio to coordinate fire support.

The most significant technological developments that influenced combat have been guided missiles, which can be used by all branches of the armed services. More recently, information technology, and its use in surveillance, including space-based reconnaissance systems, have played an increasing role in military operations. The impact of information warfare, which focuses on attacking command communication systems, and military databases, has been coupled with the use of robotic systems in combat, such as unmanned combat aerial vehicles and unmanned ground vehicles.

Recently, there has also been a particular focus towards the use of renewable fuels for running military vehicles on. Unlike fossil fuels, renewable fuels can be produced in any country, creating a strategic advantage. The U.S. military has committed itself to have 50% of its energy consumption come from alternative sources.

== As part of society ==
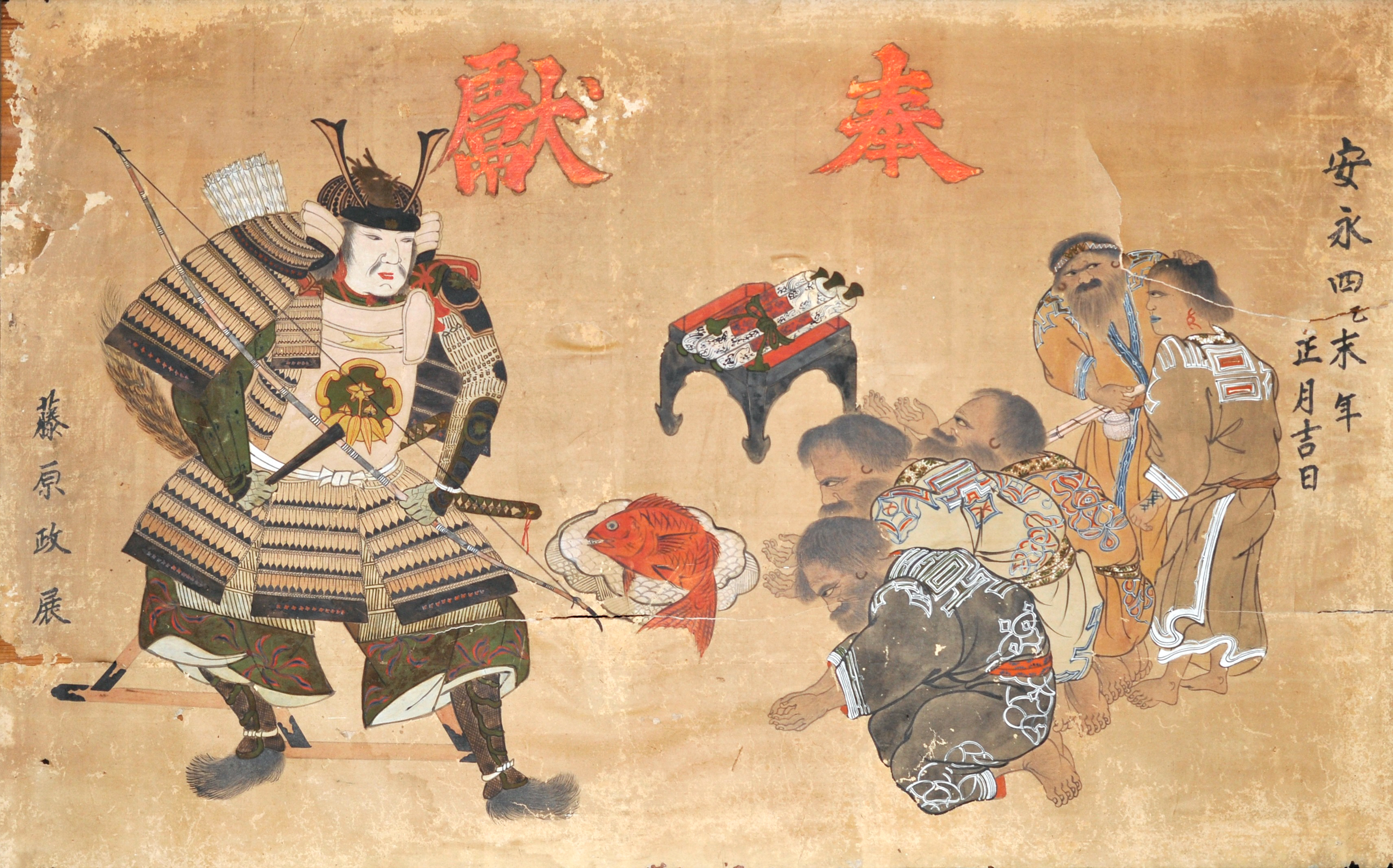
Samurai, member of the Japanese warrior caste

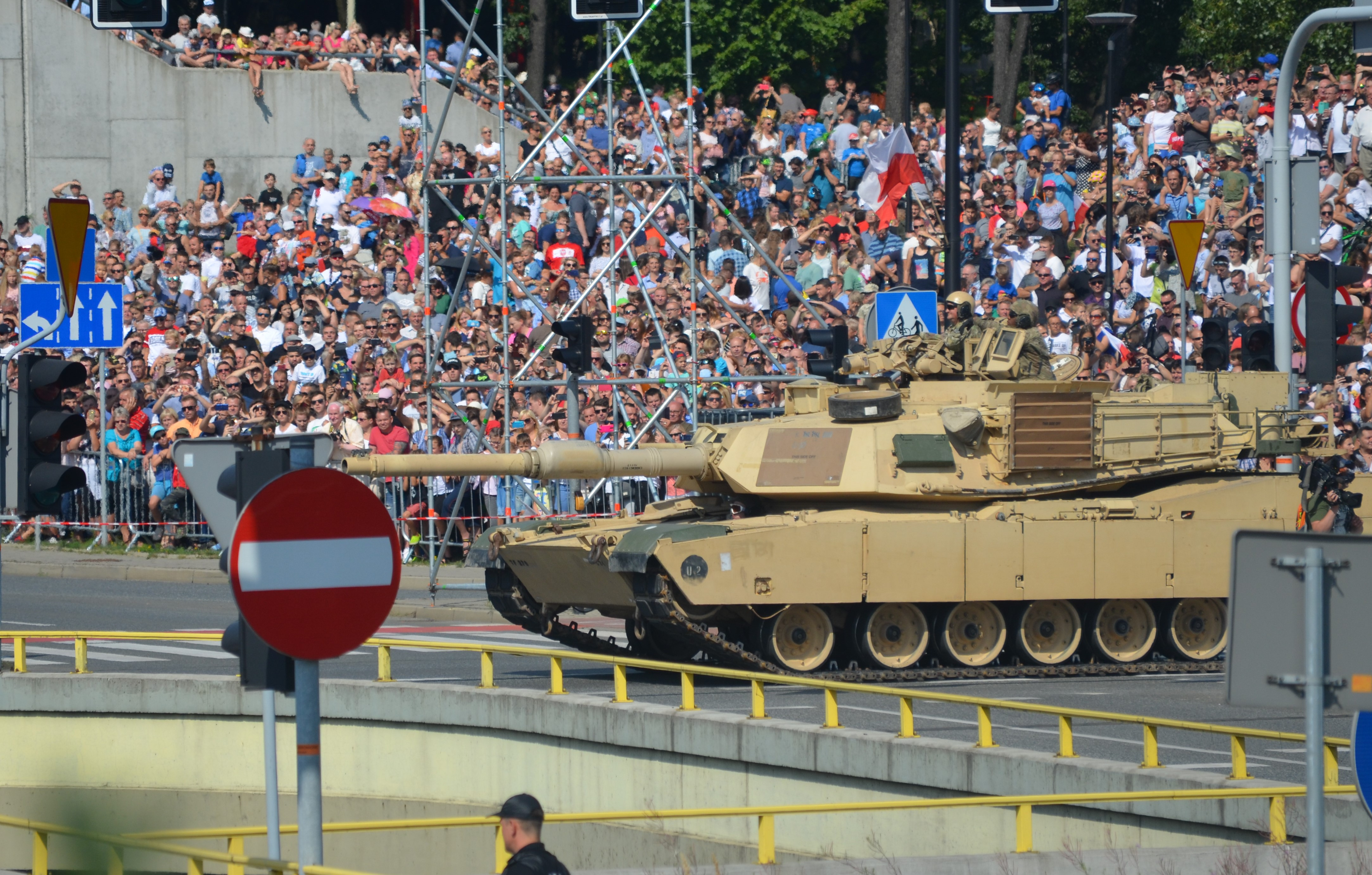
A Polish Armed Forces M1 Abrams taking part in an Armed Forces Day military parade in Katowice, 2019

For much of military history, the armed forces were considered to be for use by the heads of their societies, until recently, the crowned heads of states. In a democracy or other political system run in the public interest, it is a public force. The relationship between the military and the society it serves is a complicated and ever-evolving one. Opinion polls show majorities support. Much depends on the nature of the society itself, and whether it sees the military as important, as for example in time of threat or war, or a expense typified by defence cuts in time of peace. Opinion polls show the median voter support for military roles varies by country, tactics and costs. Public support can include air defense, militarization of border security, and militarization of police.

Military actions are sometimes argued to be justified by furthering a humanitarian cause, such as disaster relief operations to defend refugees; such actions are called military humanism.

One difficult matter in the relation between military and society is control and transparency. In some countries, limited information on military operations and budgeting is accessible for the public. However, transparency in the military sector is crucial to fight corruption. This showed the Government Defence Anti-corruption Index Transparency International UK published in 2013.

Militaries often function as societies within societies, by having their own military communities, economies, education, medicine, and other aspects of a functioning civilian society. A military is not limited to nations in of itself, as many private military companies (or PMCs) can be used or hired by organizations and figures as security, escort, or other means of protection where police, agencies, or militaries are absent or not trusted.

Militarism is the society's social attitude of being best served, or being a beneficiary of a government, or guided by concepts embodied in the military culture, doctrine, system, or leaders. Either because of the cultural memory, national history, or the potentiality of a military threat, the militarist argument asserts that a civilian population is dependent upon, and thereby subservient to the needs and goals of its military for continued independence. Militarism is sometimes contrasted with the concepts of comprehensive national power, soft power and hard power.

=== Military laws and ethics ===
Most nations have separate military laws which regulate conduct in war and during peacetime. An early exponent was Hugo Grotius, whose On the Law of War and Peace (1625) had a major impact of the humanitarian approach to warfare development. His theme was echoed by Gustavus Adolphus. Ethics of warfare have developed since 1945, to create constraints on the military treatment of prisoners and civilians, primarily by the Geneva Conventions; but rarely apply to use of the military forces as internal security troops during times of political conflict that results in popular protests and incitement to popular uprising. International protocols restrict the use, or have even created international bans on some types of weapons, notably weapons of mass destruction (WMD). International conventions define what constitutes a war crime, and provides for war crimes prosecution. Individual countries also have elaborate codes of military justice, an example being the United States' Uniform Code of Military Justice that can lead to court martial for military personnel found guilty of war crimes.

== See also ==
- Arms industry
- Chief of defence
- Civil defense
- Civilian control of the military
- Command and control
- Conscription
- Deterrence theory
- Martial arts
- Martial law
- Mercenary
- Militaria
- Military academy
- Military advisor
- Military aid
- Military aid to the civil community (MACC)
- Military aid to the civil power (MACP)
- Military alliance
- Military dictatorship
- Military district
- Military engineering
- Military exercise
- Military fiat
- Military incompetence
- Military–industrial complex
- Military junta
- Military meteorology
- Military operations other than war
- Military police
- Military prison
- Military Revolution
- Military sociology
- Military terminology
- Militarization of police
- Militia
- Ministry of defence
- Mobilization
- Police
- Staff (military)
- Standing army
- Weapon

Armed forces of the world

- List of countries by number of military and paramilitary personnel
- List of countries by level of military equipment
- List of countries by Global Militarization Index
- List of countries without armed forces
- List of militaries by country
- List of air forces
- List of armies by country
- List of navies
