= Tactical objective =

Immediate, short-term desired result of a given activity, task, or mission

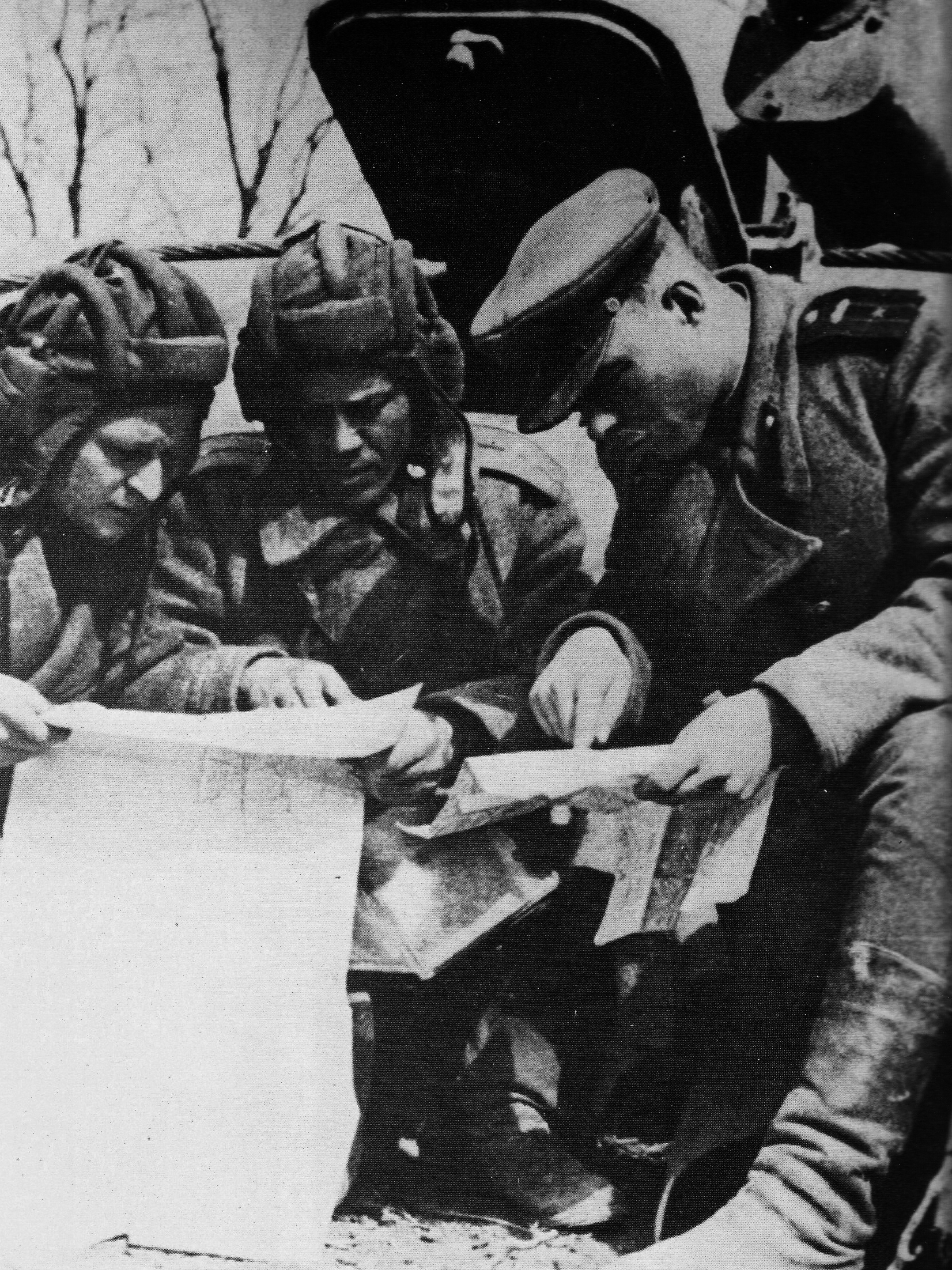
Soviet tank troops (Battle of Budapest, October 1944)

A tactical objective is the immediate short-term desired result of a given activity, task, or mission. While historically the term had been applied to military operations, in the 20th century, it has been increasingly applied in the fields of public safety, such as policing and fire-fighting, as well as commerce, trade planning, political, and international relations policy.

Whereas strategy in the military sense is about overall planning, tactics refers to day-to-day events in a war. A tactical objective is often an intermediate step to achieving an operational objective, and, as such, requires decision making and problem solving skills applied during the execution of the tactical plan as part of the operational plan.

Tactical objectives are usually entrusted to the lower positioned management in a three-tier organisation's structure of field or front desk, middle and executive management.

Tactical objectives in the commercial use represent performance targets established by the middle management for achieving specific organisational outcomes. For firefighters tactical objectives have historically focused on life-safety as the priority in the plan when attending structure fires.
