= Strategic goal =

Strategic goal may be:

- Strategic goal (business)
- Strategic goal (military)
