= Phase (combat) =

Military operation period

A phase in combat is usually a period within a military operation of a longer duration that is a part of a serial chain of logically connected activities planned to culminate in a defined objective or goal.

A phase is usually marked by achievement of significant intermediary objectives, such as tactical within an engagement. A phase may be either limited by time allocated for its execution, or unlimited in time, and defined only by achievement of the objective.

At the strategic level, a phase continue for years. Not all phases of combat include fighting between armed forces. Phases can, and usually do overlap, and sometimes can be planned for parallel execution, often as part of deception planning.

Phases typically found in offensive military operations are:

Preparation

- Intelligence gathering phase
- Operations planning phase
- Logistics management phase
- Deception and counterintelligence phase
- Assembly phase

Conduct

- Initial (combat assault) phase
- Breakthrough phase

Exploitation

- Follow-on (support) phase
- Pursuit phase
- Objective security phase
- Position consolidation phase
- Defensive phase
- Reorganisation phase
- A lull in combat (usually unplanned)

Stability

- Enable civil authorities
