= Clifford Orwin =

Canadian academic (born 1947)

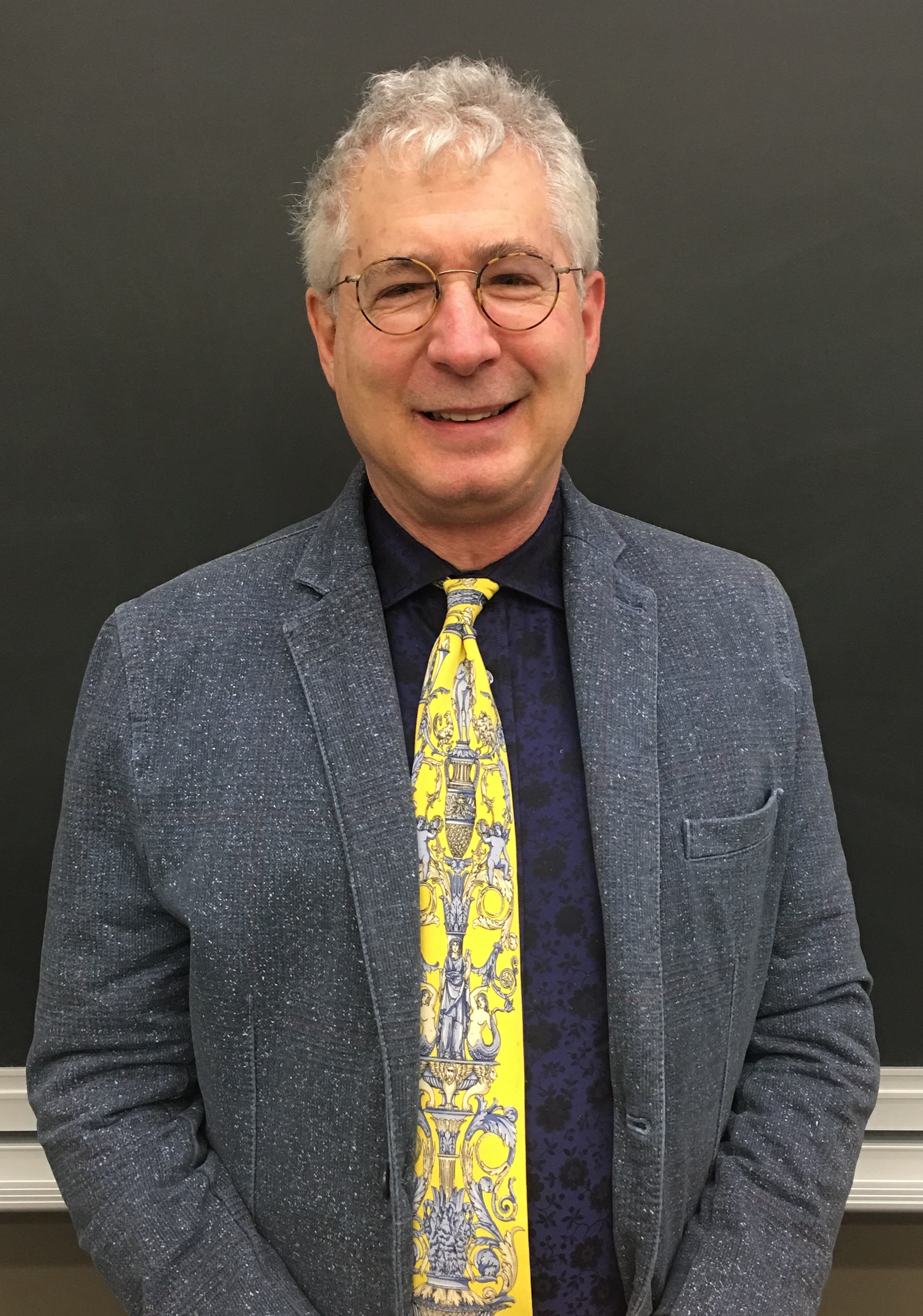
Professor Clifford Orwin in November 2016

Clifford Orwin is a Canadian-American professor of ancient, modern, contemporary and Jewish political thought. He is also a prominent writer on contemporary politics and culture.

== Life career ==
Orwin was born in 1947 in Chicago, Illinois, United States to a Jewish family. He earned B.A. in Modern History from Cornell University, where he studied political philosophy with Allan Bloom, and an M.A. and Ph.D. in Political Philosophy from Harvard University under Harvey Mansfield.

Orwin moved to Canada to take up a teaching position at the University of Toronto, and later became a Canadian citizen. He is currently a Professor of Political Philosophy, Classical Studies and Jewish Studies at the University of Toronto, where he has taught for many decades and where he currently serves as Chair of the Munk School of Global Affairs and Public Policy's program in Political Philosophy and International Affairs.

He is often identified as a Straussian and is critical of theories that identify Leo Strauss with neoconservatism and the Iraq War. He supports the Democratic Party, but is critical of its left wing.

He has held a Guggenheim Fellowship and an NEH Fellowship. He has been a Fellow at the Sheldon Chumir Foundation for Ethics in Leadership, and in 2003 he received the school's Outstanding Teaching Award. He is also a Distinguished Visiting Fellow at the Hoover Institution of Stanford University.

Multilingual, he can speak English and French and read Hebrew, Latin and Ancient Greek.

== Writing ==
He has written and translated articles on Herodotus, Thucydides, Plato, Machiavelli, Montesquieu, Churchill, Charles Taylor, American religion, and humanitarian military intervention. His books are The Humanity of Thucydides (1994), and The Legacy of Rousseau (1997) edited with Nathan Tarcov.

He projects a book on the role of compassion in modern political thought and practice, and a study of the Book of Esther. He describes Rousseau as "the modern philosopher with whom I'm most familiar".

== Controversy ==
He is often asked to speak at student events. When debating Canada's role in Afghanistan at the University of Toronto's Hart House in 2006, he was interrupted by a small demonstration.

He writes both polemical and philosophical columns for The Globe and Mail and National Post.

He is a director of Energy Probe Research Foundation, an anti-nuclear environmental organization based in Toronto.

== Teaching ==
The Chair of the University of Toronto Political Science department has said of him: "If there is another observation to be made or argument to be explored or interpretation to be developed, Cliff wants to hear it."

He has written of his teaching method: "My methods harken back to an older kind of warfare: 'Don't teach until you see the whites of their eyes.' Eye-to-eye teaching resembles hand-to-hand combat. Teacher and student struggle, and if they're lucky both lose -- each is compelled to learn from the other. It's not a relation of equals, and teachers who pretend that it is should find another calling, like talk show host. But neither is the role of the student passive."

Some of Orwin's students have become teachers and scholars themselves including Norman Doidge, a psychiatrist with affiliations at the University of Toronto and Columbia Medical School and Janis Freedman Bellow (the widow of Nobel Laureate author Saul Bellow) who lectures in English at Tufts University.
