= Military threat =

A military threat, sometimes expressed as danger of military action, a military challenge, or a military risk, is a concept in military intelligence that identifies an imminent capability for use of military force in resolving diplomatic or economic disputes. It is the ultimate escalation in international relations conflicts, and follows explicit diplomatic threat to use force as a means of coercion.

In general a military threat is identified when military personnel are detected conducting operations that can be interpreted as a phase that precedes combat, i.e. occupying positions, preparing weapons for use, and concentrating forces in an offensive manner.

It may be more appropriate to think in terms of indicators. The DoD Dictionary defines indicator as: 1. In intelligence usage, an item of information which reflects the intention or capability of an adversary to adopt or reject a course of action. (JP 2-0) 2. In operations security usage, data derived from friendly detectable actions and open-source information that an adversary can interpret and piece together to reach conclusions or estimates of friendly intentions, capabilities, or activities. (JP 3-13.3) 3. In the context of assessment, a specific piece of information that infers the condition, state, or existence of something, and provides a reliable means to ascertain performance or effectiveness. (JP 5-0)
