= Military operation =

Coordinated military actions of a state or non-state actor

A military operation (op) is the coordinated military actions of a state, or a non-state actor, in response to a developing situation. These actions are designed as a military operation plan to resolve the situation in the state or actor's favor. Operations may be of a combat or non-combat nature and may be referred to by a code name for the purpose of national security. Military operations are often known for their more generally accepted common usage names than their actual operational objectives.

== Types of military operations ==
Military operations can be classified by the scale and scope of force employment, and their impact on the wider conflict. The scope of military operations can be:

- Theater: this describes an operation over a large, often continental, area of operation and represents a strategic national commitment to the conflict, such as Operation Barbarossa, with general goals that encompass areas of consideration outside the military, such as the economic and political impact of military goals on areas concerned.
- Campaign: this describes either a subset of the theatre of operation, or a more limited geographic and operational strategic commitment, such as the Burma Campaign, and need not represent total national commitment to a conflict, or have broader goals outside the military impact.
- Battle: this describes a subset of a campaign that will have specific military goals and geographic objectives, as well as clearly defined use of forces, such as the Battle of Gallipoli, which operationally was a combined arms operation originally known as the "Dardanelles landings" as part of the Dardanelles Campaign, where about 480,000 Allied troops took part.
- Engagement: this describes a tactical combat event or contest for a specific area or objective by actions of distinct units. For example, the Battle of Kursk, also known from its German designation as Operation Citadel, included many separate engagements, several of which were combined into the Battle of Prokhorovka. The Battle of Kursk, in addition to describing the initial German offensive operation, also included two Soviet counter-offensive operations: Operation Kutuzov and Operation Polkovodets Rumyantsev.
- Strike: this describes a single attack, upon a specified target. This often forms part of a broader engagement. Strikes have an explicit goal, such as rendering facilities such as airports inoperable, assassinating enemy leaders, or limiting the delivery of supplies to enemy troops.
- Joint: a joint military operation involves multiple organizations or countries

== Definition ==
Parallel to and reflecting this framework for operations are organized elements within the armed forces which prepare for and conduct operations at various levels of war. While there is a general correlation between the size of units, the area within which they operate, and the scope of mission they perform, the correlation is not absolute. In fact, it is ultimately the mission that a unit performs that determines the level of war within which it operates.

— David M. Glantz, Soviet Military Operational Art

== See also ==
- Civil-military operations
- Effects-based operations (EBO)
- List of military operations
  - List of coalition military operations of the Iraq War
  - List of World War II military operations
- Military operation plan
- Military operations other than war (MOOTW)
- Offensive (military)
- Operational View (OV)
