= Military humanism =

Use of Violence to spread Non-Violence

Military humanism is the use of force and violence to further a humanitarian cause. Although it can easily be disputed whether or not furthering a humanitarian cause is the real intention behind such an action, the theoretical descriptive guideline still applies. The U.S.-led North Atlantic Treaty Organization (NATO) intervention in the Balkans is the most well-known case, and brought the term to prominence.

The concept is most widely explored in Noam Chomsky's book The New Military Humanism: Lessons from Kosovo (1999) in which he argues that NATO's 1999 bombing of Kosovo was not conducted for humanitarian reasons but to further the military hegemony of western democratic powers such as the United States.

== See also ==
- Military Association of Atheists & Freethinkers
