= Operational objective =

Type of business goal

In business, operational objectives (also known as tactical objectives) are short-term goals whose achievement brings an organization closer to its long-term goals. It is slightly different from strategic objectives, which are longer term goals of a business, but they are closely related, as a business will only be able to achieve strategic objectives when operational objectives have been met. Operational objectives are usually set by middle managers for the next six to twelve months based on an organisation's aim. They should be attainable and specific so that they can provide a clear guidance for daily functioning of certain operations. This business term is typically used in the context of strategic management and operational planning.

== Developing operational objectives ==
Peter Drucker suggested that operational objectives should be SMART, which means specific, measurable, achievable, realistic, and time constrained.

First, an operational objective should be specific, focused, well defined and clear enough rather than vague so that employees know what to achieve via the work. A specific objective should state the expected actions and outcomes. This would help to prevent the possibility of employees working for different goals.

Secondly, a goal should be measurable and quantifiable so that people can know whether it has been met or not. For example, an objective might be increasing sales revenue by ten percent. This would prevent the confusions and conflicts on whether it has been met between different stakeholders.

Thirdly, an objective should be achievable and feasible. It also should be agreed by stakeholders, especially by employees. If they think it is un-achievable, it might demotivate them.

Fourthly, a plan should be realistic as well as challenging. It should be reasonable given their limited resources.

Lastly, it should have a specified deadline (time frame) for its achievement. This would prevent the work from dragged on, and would help to increase productivity. It is also good to determine priorities. For example, operational objectives that would have greater influence on customer satisfaction should be completed in a faster time frame than those have less influence.

It might be difficult to set operational objectives that are understood and accepted by all employees, as they might see different priorities and values. Therefore, it is important to let employees to participate in the determining of the objectives and to state them as clearly as possible. After setting appropriate operational objectives for each department, business plans can then be made to achieve them.

== Factors that affect operational objectives of an organization ==
According to Drucker P.F., objectives must be reviewed and changed constantly. This is because operational objectives can be influenced by many internal and external factors. Organisations may need to change their objectives over time in response to changes in their environment.

=== Internal influences ===
One of the key internal influences is the amount of available finance. A number of operational decisions would involve considerable investment. Another internal influence can be the type and size of an organisation. For example, if a business changes its legal structure, its aim might be changed and its operational objectives should be revised as well. In addition, key stakeholders such as managers, owners, and customers can influence the objectives. For example, if they have a high willingness and ability to take a risk, then more ambitious objectives might be set.

=== External influences ===
One of the external factors is economic influences. If the state of economy gets worse, a firm would like to change its objectives so that it can mainly focuses on survival of the business. Another external factor can be technological development. As technology can affect both the process of production and distribution, it is likely to change operational objectives of an organisation. A business should adapt to change and strive to innovate. By maintaining innovative, a business can obtain competitive advantages that makes it distinguish to its competitors. Lastly, government regulations and constraints can also affect objectives of a business, as they can limit what a business want to achieve.

== Examples of operational objectives ==
=== Survival ===
One of the most common operational objective for businesses is survival. For new businesses, survival would be their main priority, as they are likely to face a number of problems, such as negative cash flows and intense competition. Survival can also be an important priority for established firms, as facing an economic recession and becoming a takeover target can be a significant threat to its survival.

=== Increasing sales revenue ===
Another common operational objective can be increasing sales revenue. This is very important for all businesses, as it is directly related to their survival. However, firms with a high sales revenue might struggle to survive, as it is not profit.

=== Raising market share ===
Many businesses set raising market share as their operational objective. By increasing sales, this will be also improved.

For many businesses, each department tends to set its own operational objectives. Examples of SMART operational objectives that a business might have are:

- For the human resource department - to maintain employee turnover rate below ten percent for next six months
- For the sales department - to increase sales revenue by ten percent over the next six months
- For the marketing department - to increase the market share by seven percent over the next one year

and taking risk to stake holder

== Importance of operational objectives ==
=== Motivation ===
If an organisation has SMART operational objectives, employees can be inspired and motivated to work harder to meet common objectives, as they are measured. By achieving short term goals, employees might feel a great sense of accomplishment and this would help to improve their motivation. According to a research conducted by Rodgers, R. and Je Hunter, management by objectives (MBO) has been shown to increase productivity. Operational objectives also encourage managers to think strategically. In order to set objectives and plan for the next 6 to 12 months, they need to have a deep understanding of business's current position. According to Peter Drucker, rewards such as recognition, appreciation and performance-related pay need to be provided for achieving objectives to motivate employees and raise efficiency.

=== Measure and control ===
Operational objectives help to control and unify an organisation, as they are short-term goals, which are consistent with its aim. In addition, they enable managers not only to track the performance of the workforce against targets, but also to measure and evaluate their performance so that managers can provide feedback and rewards. This would help to identify the areas they have problems and need improvements in order to attain their aims.

=== Guidance and direction ===
By stating an organisation's operational objectives specifically, they would provide employees a guidance and direction. Operational objectives tend to be specific and measurable, so that they can help an organisation to achieve its long term goals. It can also help to improve budgeting. For example, the sales department might set an operational objective, which targets to raise sales revenue for the next several months. This encourages managers to predict what level of sales revenue will be in the future, and help them to budget better.
