= Strategic goal (military) =

Desired end-state of a war or a campaign

A strategic military goal is used in strategic military operation plans to define the desired end-state of a war or a campaign. Usually it entails either a strategic change in an enemy's military posture, intentions or ongoing operations, or achieving a strategic victory over the enemy that ends the conflict, although the goal can be set in terms of diplomatic or economic conditions, defined by purely territorial gains, or the evidence that the enemy's will to fight has been broken. Sometimes the strategic goal can be to limit the scope of the conflict.

It is the highest level of organisational achievement in a military organisation, and is usually defined by the national defence policy. In terms of goal assignment it corresponds to operations performed by a front or a fleet on a theatre scale, and by an Army group or, during World War II, by a Red Army Front.

== Description ==
A strategic goal is achieved by reaching specific strategic objectives that represent intermediary and incremental advances within the overall strategic plan. This is necessary because "high-level" strategic goals are often abstract, and therefore difficult to assess in terms of achievement without referring to some specific, often physical objectives. However, aside from the obstacles used by the enemy to prevent achievement of the strategic goal, inappropriate technological capabilities and operational weakness in combat may prevent fulfilment of the strategic plan. As an example, these are illustrated by the failure of the Royal Air Force's Bomber Command during the winter of 1943-44:

A critical product of the analysis which leads to the strategic decision to use military force is determination of the national goal to be achieved by that application of force.

However, analysis of military history abounds with examples of the two factors that plague goal setting in military strategies, their change during the campaign or war due to changes in economic, political or social changes within the state, or in a change of how achievement of the existing goal is being assessed, and the criteria of its achievement. For example:

The complex and varied nature of the Vietnam War made it especially difficult to translate abstract, strategic goals into specific missions for individual organizations.

This occurred because of the economic change that saw the cost of the war escalate beyond the original predictions and the changing political leadership, which was no longer willing to commit to the conduct of the war, but also due to the radical change which United States society experienced during the war, and more importantly because:

The American strategic goal was not the destruction of an organized military machine armed with tanks, planes, helicopters, and war ships, for which the United States had prepared, but the preservation of a fragile regime from the lightly armed attacks of both its own people and the North Vietnamese.

The United States did not intend to conquer North Vietnam for fear of a Chinese or Soviet military reaction. Likewise, the United States strategically assumed that the full extent of its power was not merited in the Vietnam War.

== See also ==
- U.S. Army Strategist

== Sources ==
- Aron, Raymond, (ed.), Peace & War: A Theory of International Relations, Transaction Publishers, 2003. ISBN 978-0-7658-0504-1
- Millett, Allan R. & Murray, Williamson, (eds.), Military Effectiveness: The First World War, Volume I., Mershon Center series on International Security and Foreign Policy, Routledge, 1988
- Newell, Clayton R., Framework of Operational War, Routledge, 1991
- Gartner, Scott Sigmund, Strategic Assessment in War, Yale University Press, 1999
- Anderson, David L. Columbia's Guide to the Vietnam War, New York: Columbia UP, 2002. ISBN 978-0-231114936
