= Carl von Clausewitz =

Prussian military theorist (1780–1831)

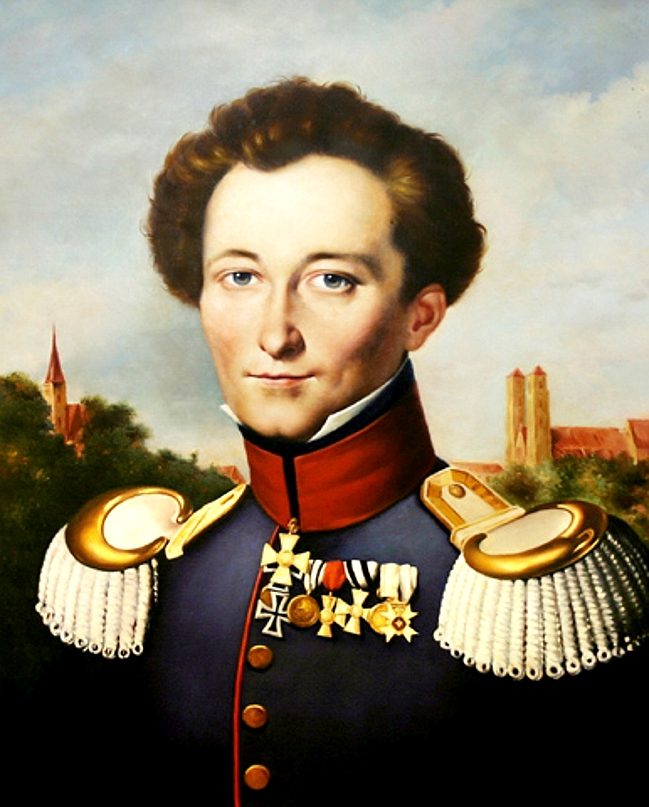
- Portrait by Wilhelm Wach, c. 1830
- Born: Carl Philipp Gottlieb Clauswitz; 1 July 1780; Burg bei Magdeburg, Prussia, Holy Roman Empire
- Died: 16 November 1831 (aged 51); Breslau, Province of Silesia, Kingdom of Prussia
- Spouse: Marie von Brühl (m. 1810)
- Military career
- Allegiance: Prussia; Russia
- Branch: Prussian Army; Imperial Russian Army
- Service years: 1792–1831 (Prussia); 1812–1813 (Russia)
- Rank: Major general (Prussian Army)
- Units: Russian–German Legion
- Commands: Prussian Military Academy
- Conflicts: See battles: French Revolutionary Wars; Siege of Mainz (1793); Napoleonic Wars; Battle of Jena–Auerstedt; Battle of Borodino; Battle of Ligny; Battle of Wavre

Carl Philipp Gottlieb von Clausewitz (Note: In German personal names, von is a preposition which approximately means 'of' or 'from' and usually denotes some sort of nobility. While von (always lower case) is part of the family name or territorial designation, not a first or middle name, if the noble is referred to by their last name, use Schiller, Clausewitz or Goethe, not von Schiller, etc.) (/ˈklaʊzəvɪts/ KLOW-zə-vits; German: [ˈkaʁl fɔn ˈklaʊzəvɪts]; born Carl Philipp Gottlieb Clauswitz; 1 July 1780 – 16 November 1831) was a Prussian army officer and military theorist who stressed the "moral" (in modern terms meaning psychological) and political aspects of waging war. His most notable work, Vom Kriege (On War), though unfinished at his death, is considered a seminal treatise on military strategy and science.

Clausewitz stressed the multiple interactions of diverse factors in war, noting how unexpected developments unfolding under the "fog of war" (i.e., in the face of incomplete, dubious, and often erroneous information and great fear, doubt, and excitement) call for rapid decisions by alert commanders. He saw history as a vital check on erudite abstractions that did not accord with experience. In contrast to the early work of Antoine-Henri Jomini, he argued that war could not be quantified or reduced to mapwork, geometry, and graphs. Clausewitz had many aphorisms, of which one of the most famous is, "War is the continuation of policy with other means."

== Name ==
Clausewitz's Christian names are variously given in English-language sources as "Karl", "Carl Philipp Gottlieb", or "Carl Maria." He spelled his own given name with a "C" to identify with the classical Western tradition; writers who use "Karl" are often seeking to emphasize his German (rather than European) identity. "Carl Philipp Gottfried" appears on Clausewitz's tombstone. Encyclopædia Britannica continues to use Gottlieb instead of Gottfried based on older sources, such as military historian Peter Paret, and historian Sir Michael Howard originated the use of "Carl Maria." However, more modern scholars like Christopher Bassford (editor of ClausewitzStudies.org) and Vanya Eftimova Bellinger (who wrote the 2016 biography of Carl's wife Marie von Clausewitz) consider his tombstone a more reliable source than the hand-written birth records used by Paret.

== Early life and education ==
Clausewitz was born on 1 July 1780 in Burg bei Magdeburg in the Prussian Duchy of Magdeburg as the fourth and youngest son of a family that made claims to a noble status which Carl accepted. Clausewitz's family claimed descent from the Barons of Clausewitz in Upper Silesia, though scholars question the connection.

His grandfather, the son of a Lutheran pastor, had been a professor of theology. Clausewitz's father, once a lieutenant in the army of Frederick the Great, King of Prussia, held a minor post in the Prussian internal-revenue service.

== Military career ==
Clausewitz entered the Prussian military service at the age of twelve as a lance corporal, eventually attaining the rank of major general.

Clausewitz served in the Rhine campaigns (1793–1794) including the siege of Mainz, when the Prussian Army invaded France during the French Revolution, and fought in the Napoleonic Wars from 1806 to 1815. He entered the Kriegsakademie (also cited as "The German War School", the "Military Academy in Berlin", and the "Prussian Military Academy," later the "War College") in Berlin in 1801 (aged 21), probably studied the writings of the philosophers Immanuel Kant and/or Johann Gottlieb Fichte and Friedrich Schleiermacher and won the regard of General Gerhard von Scharnhorst, the future first chief-of-staff of the newly reformed Prussian Army (appointed 1809). Clausewitz, Hermann von Boyen (1771–1848) and Karl von Grolman (1777–1843) were among Scharnhorst's primary allies in his efforts to reform the Prussian army between 1807 and 1814.

Clausewitz served during the Jena Campaign as aide-de-camp to Prince August. At the Battle of Jena-Auerstedt on 14 October 1806—when Napoleon invaded Prussia and defeated the Prussian-Saxon army commanded by Karl Wilhelm Ferdinand, Duke of Brunswick—he was captured, one of the 25,000 prisoners taken that day as the Prussian army disintegrated. He was 26. Clausewitz was held prisoner with his prince in France from 1807 to 1808. Returning to Prussia, he assisted in the reform of the Prussian army and state. Johann Gottlieb Fichte wrote On Machiavelli, as an Author, and Passages from His Writings in June 1807. ("Über Machiavell, als Schriftsteller, und Stellen aus seinen Schriften" ). Carl Clausewitz wrote an interesting and anonymous Letter to Fichte (1809) about his book on Machiavelli. The letter was published in Fichte's Verstreute kleine Schriften 157–166. For an English translation of the letter see Carl von Clausewitz Historical and Political Writings Edited by: Peter Paret and D. Moran (1992).

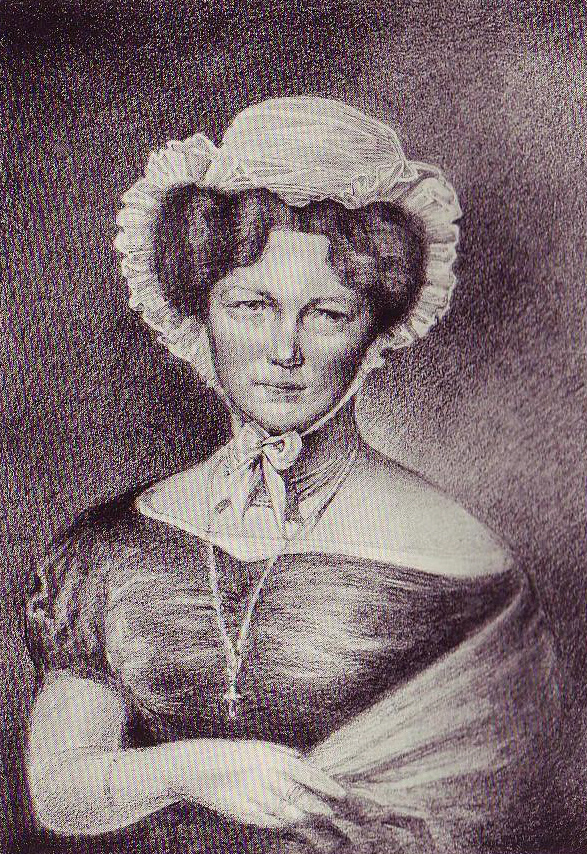
Marie von Clausewitz (née, Countess von Brühl)

On 10 December 1810, he married the socially prominent Countess Marie von Brühl, whom he had first met in 1803. She was a member of an old German noble Brühl family originating in Thuringia. The couple moved in the highest circles, socialising with Berlin's political, literary, and intellectual élite. Marie was well-educated and politically well-connected—she played an important role in her husband's career progress and intellectual evolution. She also edited, published, and introduced his collected works.

Opposed to Prussia's enforced alliance with Napoleon, Clausewitz left the Prussian army and served in the Imperial Russian Army from 1812 to 1813 during the Russian campaign, taking part in the Battle of Borodino (1812). Like many Prussian officers serving in Russia, he joined the Russian–German Legion in 1813. In the service of the Russian Empire, Clausewitz helped negotiate the Convention of Tauroggen (1812), which prepared the way for the coalition of Prussia, Russia, and the United Kingdom that ultimately defeated Napoleon and his allies.

In 1815 the Russian-German Legion became integrated into the Prussian Army and Clausewitz re-entered Prussian service as a colonel. He was soon appointed chief-of-staff of Johann von Thielmann's III Corps. In that capacity he served at the Battle of Ligny and the Battle of Wavre during the Waterloo campaign in 1815. An army led personally by Napoleon defeated the Prussians at Ligny (south of Mont-Saint-Jean and the village of Waterloo) on 16 June 1815, but they withdrew in good order. Napoleon's failure to destroy the Prussian forces led to his defeat a few days later at the Battle of Waterloo (18 June 1815), when the Prussian forces arrived on his right flank late in the afternoon to support the Anglo-Dutch forces pressing his front. Napoleon had convinced his troops that the field grey uniforms were those of Marshal Grouchy's grenadiers. Clausewitz's unit fought heavily outnumbered at Wavre (18–19 June 1815), preventing large reinforcements from reaching Napoleon at Waterloo. After the war, Clausewitz served as the director of the Kriegsakademie, where he served until 1830. In that year he returned to active duty with the army. Soon afterward, the outbreak of several revolutions around Europe and a crisis in Poland appeared to presage another major European war. Clausewitz was appointed chief of staff of the only army Prussia was able to mobilise in this emergency, which was sent to the Polish border. Its commander, Gneisenau, died of cholera (August 1831), and Clausewitz took command of the Prussian army's efforts to construct a cordon sanitaire to contain the great cholera outbreak (the first time cholera had appeared in modern heartland Europe, causing a continent-wide panic). Clausewitz himself died of the same disease shortly afterwards, on 16 November 1831.

His widow edited, published, and wrote the introduction to his magnum opus on the philosophy of war in 1832. (He had started working on the text in 1816 but had not completed it.) She wrote the preface for On War and had published most of his collected works by 1835. She died in January 1836.

== Theory of war ==
Clausewitz was a professional combat soldier and a staff officer who was involved in numerous military campaigns, but he is famous primarily as a military theorist interested in the examination of war, utilising the campaigns of Frederick the Great and Napoleon as frames of reference for his work. He wrote a careful, systematic, philosophical examination of war in all its aspects. The result was his principal book, Vom Kriege (in English, On War), a major work on the philosophy of war. It was unfinished when Clausewitz died and contains material written at different stages in his intellectual evolution, producing some significant contradictions between different sections. The sequence and precise character of that evolution is a source of much debate as to the exact meaning behind some seemingly contradictory observations in discussions pertinent to the tactical, operational and strategic levels of war, for example (though many of these apparent contradictions are simply the result of his dialectical method). Clausewitz constantly sought to revise the text, particularly between 1827 and his departure on his last field assignments, to include more material on "people's war" and forms of war other than high-intensity warfare between states, but relatively little of this material was included in the book. Soldiers before this time had written treatises on various military subjects, but none had undertaken a great philosophical examination of war on the scale of those written by Clausewitz and Leo Tolstoy, both of whom were inspired by the events of the Napoleonic Era.

Clausewitz's work is still studied today, demonstrating its continued relevance. More than sixteen major English-language books that focused specifically on his work were published between 2005 and 2014, whereas his 19th-century rival Jomini has faded from influence. The historian Lynn Montross said that this outcome "may be explained by the fact that Jomini produced a system of war, Clausewitz a philosophy. The one has been outdated by new weapons, the other still influences the strategy behind those weapons." Jomini did not attempt to define war but Clausewitz did, providing (and dialectically comparing) a number of definitions. The first is his dialectical thesis: "War is thus an act of force to compel our enemy to do our will." The second, often treated as Clausewitz's 'bottom line,' is in fact merely his dialectical antithesis: "War is merely the continuation of policy [or politics—the German original is Politik, which encompasses both of those rather different English words] with other means." The synthesis of his dialectical examination of the nature of war—and thus his actual definition of war—is his famous "trinity," saying that war is, "when regarded as a whole, in relation to the tendencies predominating in it, a strange trinity, composed of the original violence of its essence, the hate and enmity which are to be regarded as a blind, natural impulse; of the play of probabilities and chance, which make it a free activity of the emotions; and of the subordinate character of a political tool, through which it belongs to the province of pure intelligence." Christopher Bassford says the best shorthand for Clausewitz's trinity should be something like "violent emotion/chance/rational calculation." However, it is frequently presented as "people/army/government," a misunderstanding based on a later paragraph in the same section. This misrepresentation was popularised by U.S. Army Colonel Harry Summers' Vietnam-era interpretation, facilitated by weaknesses in the 1976 Howard/Paret translation.

The degree to which Clausewitz managed to revise his manuscript to reflect that synthesis is the subject of much debate. His final reference to war and Politik, however, goes beyond his widely quoted antithesis: "War is simply the continuation of political intercourse with the addition of other means. We deliberately use the phrase 'with the addition of other means' because we also want to make it clear that war in itself does not suspend political intercourse or change it into something entirely different. In essentials that intercourse continues, irrespective of the means it employs. The main lines along which military events progress, and to which they are restricted, are political lines that continue throughout the war into the subsequent peace."

A prince or general who knows exactly how to organise his war according to his object and means, who does neither too little nor too much, gives by that the greatest proof of his genius. But the effects of this talent are exhibited not so much by the invention of new modes of action, which might strike the eye immediately, as in the successful final result of the whole. It is the exact fulfilment of silent suppositions, it is the noiseless harmony of the whole action which we should admire, and which only makes itself known in the total result.

— Clausewitz, On War, Book III, Chapter 1

Clausewitz introduced systematic philosophical contemplation into Western military thinking, with powerful implications not only for historical and analytical writing but also for practical policy, military instruction, and operational planning. He relied on his own experiences, contemporary writings about Napoleon, and on deep historical research. His historiographical approach is evident in his first extended study, written when he was 25, of the Thirty Years' War. In On War, Clausewitz sees all wars as the sum of decisions, actions, and reactions in an uncertain and dangerous context, and also as a socio-political phenomenon. He also stressed the complex nature of war, which encompasses both the socio-political and the operational and stresses the primacy of state policy. (One should be careful not to limit his observations on war to war between states, however, as he certainly discusses other kinds of protagonists). Clausewitz, according to Azar Gat, expressed in the field of military theory the main themes of the Romantic reaction against the worldview of the Enlightenment, rejecting universal principles and stressing historical diversity and the forces of the human spirit. This explains the strength and value of many of his arguments, derived from this great cultural movement, but also his often harsh rhetoric against his predecessors.

The word "strategy" had only recently come into usage in modern Europe, and Clausewitz's definition is quite narrow: "the use of engagements for the object of war" (which many today would call "the operational level" of war). Clausewitz conceived of war as a political, social, and military phenomenon which might—depending on circumstances—involve the entire population of a political entity at war. In any case, Clausewitz saw military force as an instrument that states and other political actors use to pursue the ends of their policy, in a dialectic between opposing wills, each with the aim of imposing his policies and will upon his enemy.

Clausewitz's emphasis on the inherent superiority of the defense suggests that habitual aggressors are likely to end up as failures. The inherent superiority of the defense obviously does not mean that the defender will always win, however: there are other asymmetries to be considered. He was interested in co-operation between the regular army and militia or partisan forces, or citizen soldiers, as one possible—sometimes the only—method of defense. In the circumstances of the Wars of the French Revolution and those with Napoleon, which were energised by a rising spirit of nationalism, he emphasised the need for states to involve their entire populations in the conduct of war. This point is especially important, as these wars demonstrated that such energies could be of decisive importance and for a time led to a democratisation of the armed forces much as universal suffrage democratised politics.

While Clausewitz was intensely aware of the value of intelligence at all levels, he was also very skeptical of the accuracy of much military intelligence: "Many intelligence reports in war are contradictory; even more are false, and most are uncertain.... In short, most intelligence is false." This circumstance is generally described as part of the fog of war. Such skeptical comments apply only to intelligence at the tactical and operational levels; at the strategic and political levels he constantly stressed the requirement for the best possible understanding of what today would be called strategic and political intelligence. His conclusions were influenced by his experiences in the Prussian Army, which was often in an intelligence fog due partly to the superior abilities of Napoleon's system but even more simply to the nature of war. Clausewitz acknowledges that friction creates enormous difficulties for the realization of any plan, and the fog of war hinders commanders from knowing what is happening. It is precisely in the context of this challenge that he develops the concept of military genius (German: der kriegerische Genius), evidenced above all in the execution of operations. 'Military genius' is not simply a matter of intellect, but a combination of qualities of intellect, experience, personality, and temperament (and there are many possible such combinations) that create a very highly developed mental aptitude for the waging of war.

=== Principal ideas ===
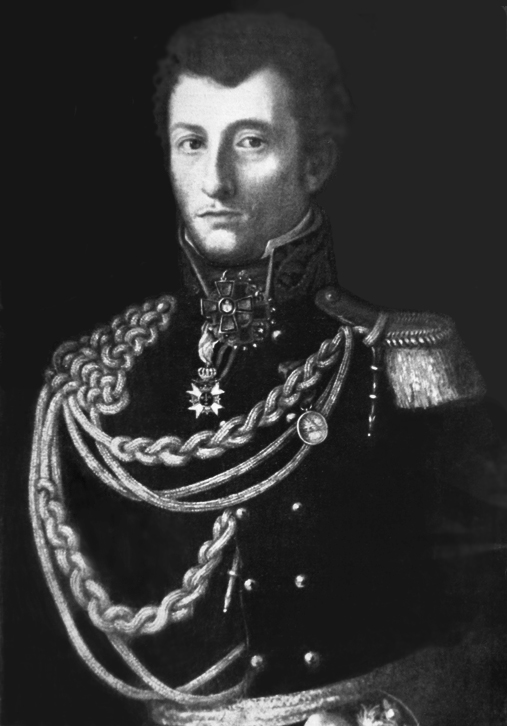
Clausewitz as a young man

Key ideas discussed in On War include:

- the dialectical approach to military analysis
- the methods of "critical analysis"
- the economic profit-seeking logic of commercial enterprise is equally applicable to the waging of war and negotiating for peace
- the nature of the balance-of-power mechanism
- the relationship between political objectives and military objectives in war
- the asymmetrical relationship between attack and defense
- the nature of "military genius" (involving matters of personality and character, beyond intellect)
- the "fascinating trinity" (wunderliche Dreifaltigkeit) of war
- philosophical distinctions between "absolute war," "ideal war," and "real war"
- in "real war," the distinctive poles of a) limited objectives (political and/or military) and b) war to "render the enemy helpless"
- the idea that war and its conduct belong fundamentally to the social realm rather than to the realms of art or science
- "strategy" belongs primarily to the realm of art, but is constrained by quantitative analyses of political benefits versus military costs & losses
- "tactics" belongs primarily to the realm of science (most obvious in the development of siege warfare)
- the importance of "moral forces" (more than simply "morale") as opposed to quantifiable physical elements
- the "military virtues" of professional armies (which do not necessarily trump the rather different virtues of other kinds of fighting forces)
- conversely, the very real effects of a superiority in numbers and "mass"
- the essential unpredictability of war
- the "fog of war" (Note: "[T]he great uncertainty of all data in war is a peculiar difficulty, because all action must, to a certain extent, be planned in a mere twilight, which in addition not unfrequently—like the effect of a fog or moonshine—gives to things exaggerated dimensions and an unnatural appearance.")
- "friction" – the disparity between the ideal performance of units, organisations or systems and their actual performance in real-world scenarios (Book I, Chapter VII)
- strategic and operational "centers of gravity" (Note: "As the centre of gravity is always situated where the greatest mass of matter is collected, and as a shock against the center of gravity of a body always produces the greatest effect, and further, as the most effective blow is struck with the center of gravity of the power used, so it is also in war. The armed forces of every belligerent, whether of a single state or of an alliance of states, have a certain unity, and in that way, connection; but where connection is there come in analogies of the center of gravity. There are, therefore, in these armed forces certain centers of gravity, the movement and direction of which decide upon other points, and these centers of gravity are situated where the greatest bodies of troops are assembled. But just as, in the world of inert matter, the action against the center of gravity has its measure and limits in the connection of the parts, so it is in war, and here as well as there the force exerted may easily be greater than the resistance requires, and then there is a blow in the air, a waste of force.")
- the "culminating point of the offensive"
- the "culminating point of victory"

== Interpretation and misinterpretation ==
Clausewitz used a dialectical method to construct his argument, leading to frequent misinterpretation of his ideas. British military theorist B. H. Liddell Hart contends that the enthusiastic acceptance by the Prussian military establishment—especially Moltke the Elder, a former student of Clausewitz—of what they believed to be Clausewitz's ideas, and the subsequent widespread adoption of the Prussian military system worldwide, had a deleterious effect on military theory and practice, due to their egregious misinterpretation of his ideas:

As so often happens, Clausewitz's disciples carried his teaching to an extreme which their master had not intended.... [Clausewitz's] theory of war was expounded in a way too abstract and involved for ordinary soldier-minds, essentially concrete, to follow the course of his argument—which often turned back from the direction in which it was apparently leading. Impressed yet befogged, they grasped at his vivid leading phrases, seeing only their surface meaning, and missing the deeper current of his thought.

As described by Christopher Bassford, then-professor of strategy at the National War College of the United States:

One of the main sources of confusion about Clausewitz's approach lies in his dialectical method of presentation. For example, Clausewitz's famous line that "War is the continuation of policy with other means," ("Der Krieg ist eine bloße Fortsetzung der Politik mit anderen Mitteln") while accurate as far as it goes, was not intended as a statement of fact. It is the antithesis in a dialectical argument whose thesis is the point—made earlier in the analysis—that "war is nothing but a duel [or wrestling match, the extended metaphor in which that discussion was embedded] on a larger scale." His synthesis, which resolves the deficiencies of these two bold statements, says that war is neither "nothing but" an act of brute force nor "merely" a rational act of politics or policy. This synthesis lies in his "fascinating trinity" [wunderliche Dreifaltigkeit]: a dynamic, inherently unstable interaction of the forces of violent emotion, chance, and rational calculation.

Another example of this confusion is the idea that Clausewitz was a proponent of total war as used in the Third Reich's propaganda in the 1940s. In fact, Clausewitz never used the term "total war": rather, he discussed "absolute war," a concept which evolved into the much more abstract notion of "ideal war" discussed at the very beginning of Vom Kriege—the purely logical result of the forces underlying a "pure," Platonic "ideal" of war. In what he called a "logical fantasy," war cannot be waged in a limited way: the rules of competition will force participants to use all means at their disposal to achieve victory. But in the real world, he said, such rigid logic is unrealistic and dangerous. As a practical matter, the military objectives in real war that support political objectives generally fall into two broad types: limited aims or the effective "disarming" of the enemy "to render [him] politically helpless or militarily impotent. Thus, the complete defeat of the enemy may not be necessary, desirable, or even possible.

According to Azar Gat, the opposing interpretations of Clausewitz are rooted in Clausewitz's own conceptual journey. The centerpiece of Clausewitz's theory of war throughout his life was his concept of all-out fighting and energetic conduct leading to the great battle of annihilation. He believed such conduct expressed the very "nature", or "lasting spirit" of war. Accordingly, Clausewitz disparaged the significance of the maneuver, surprise, and cunning in war, as distracting from the centrality of battle, and argued that defense was legitimate only if and as long as one was weaker than the enemy.

The British military historian John Keegan attacked Clausewitz's theory in his book A History of Warfare. Keegan argued that Clausewitz assumed the existence of states, yet 'war antedates the state, diplomacy and strategy by many millennia.'

== Influence ==
Clausewitz died without completing Vom Kriege, but despite this his ideas have been widely influential in military theory and have had a strong influence on German military thought specifically. Later Prussian and German generals, such as Helmuth Graf von Moltke, were clearly influenced by Clausewitz: Moltke's widely quoted statement that "No operational plan extends with high certainty beyond the first encounter with the main enemy force" is a classic reflection of Clausewitz's insistence on the roles of chance, friction, "fog", uncertainty, and interactivity in war.

Clausewitz's influence spread to British thinking as well, though at first more as a historian and analyst than as a theorist. See for example Wellington's extended essay discussing Clausewitz's study of the Campaign of 1815—Wellington's only serious written discussion of the battle, which was widely discussed in 19th-century Britain. Clausewitz's broader thinking came to the fore following Britain's military embarrassments in the Boer War (1899–1902). One example of a heavy Clausewitzian influence in that era is Spenser Wilkinson, journalist, the first Chichele Professor of Military History at Oxford University, and perhaps the most prominent military analyst in Britain from c. 1885 until well into the interwar period. Another is naval historian Julian Corbett (1854–1922), whose work reflected a deep if idiosyncratic adherence to Clausewitz's concepts and frequently an emphasis on Clausewitz's ideas about 'limited objectives' and the inherent strengths of the defensive form of war. Corbett's practical strategic views were often in prominent public conflict with Wilkinson's—see, for example, Wilkinson's article "Strategy at Sea", The Morning Post, 12 February 1912. Following the First World War, however, the influential British military commentator B. H. Liddell Hart in the 1920s erroneously attributed to him the doctrine of "total war" that during the First World War had been embraced by many European general staffs and emulated by the British. More recent scholars typically see that war as so confused in terms of political rationale that it in fact contradicts much of On War. That view assumes, however, a set of values as to what constitutes "rational" political objectives—in this case, values not shaped by the fervid Social Darwinism that was rife in 1914 Europe. One of the most influential British Clausewitzians today is Colin S. Gray; historian Hew Strachan (like Wilkinson also the Chichele Professor of Military History at Oxford University, since 2001) has been an energetic proponent of the study of Clausewitz, but his own views on Clausewitz's ideas are somewhat ambivalent.

With some interesting exceptions (e.g., John McAuley Palmer, Robert M. Johnston, Hoffman Nickerson), Clausewitz had little influence on American military thought before 1945 other than via British writers, though Generals Eisenhower and Patton were avid readers of English translations. He did influence Karl Marx, Friedrich Engels, Vladimir Lenin, Leon Trotsky, Võ Nguyên Giáp, Ferdinand Foch, and Mao Zedong, and thus the Communist Soviet and Chinese traditions, as Lenin emphasized the inevitability of wars among capitalist states in the age of imperialism and presented the armed struggle of the working class as the only path toward the eventual elimination of war. Because Lenin was an admirer of Clausewitz and called him "one of the great military writers," his influence on the Red Army was immense. The Russian historian A.N. Mertsalov commented that "It was an irony of fate that the view in the USSR was that it was Lenin who shaped the attitude towards Clausewitz, and that Lenin's dictum that war is a continuation of politics is taken from the work of this [allegedly] anti-humanist anti-revolutionary." The American mathematician Anatol Rapoport wrote in 1968 that Clausewitz as interpreted by Lenin formed the basis of all Soviet military thinking since 1917, and quoted the remarks by Marshal V.D. Sokolovsky:

In describing the essence of war, Marxism-Leninism takes as its point of departure the premise that war is not an aim in itself, but rather a tool of politics. In his remarks on Clausewitz's On War, Lenin stressed that "Politics is the reason, and war is only the tool, not the other way around. Consequently, it remains only to subordinate the military point of view to the political."

Henry A. Kissinger, however, described Lenin's approach as being that politics is a continuation of war by other means, thus turning Clausewitz's argument "on its head."

Rapoport argued that:

As for Lenin's approval of Clausewitz, it probably stems from his obsession with the struggle for power. The whole Marxist conception of history is that of successive struggles for power, primarily between social classes. This was constantly applied by Lenin in a variety of contexts. Thus the entire history of philosophy appears in Lenin's writings as a vast struggle between "idealism" and "materialism." The fate of the socialist movement was to be decided by a struggle between the revolutionists and the reformers. Clausewitz's acceptance of the struggle for power as the essence of international politics must have impressed Lenin as starkly realistic.

Clausewitz directly influenced Mao Zedong, who read On War in 1938 and organised a seminar on Clausewitz for the Party leadership in Yan'an. Thus the "Clausewitzian" content in many of Mao's writings is not merely a regurgitation of Lenin but reflects Mao's own study. The idea that war involves inherent "friction" that distorts, to a greater or lesser degree, all prior arrangements, has become common currency in fields such as business strategy and sport. The phrase fog of war derives from Clausewitz's stress on how confused warfare can seem while one is immersed within it. The term center of gravity, used in a military context derives from Clausewitz's usage, which he took from Newtonian mechanics. In U.S. military doctrine, "center of gravity" refers to the basis of an opponent's power at the operational, strategic, or political level, though this is only one aspect of Clausewitz's use of the term.

=== Late 20th and early 21st century ===
The deterrence strategy of the United States in the 1950s was closely inspired by President Dwight Eisenhower's reading of Clausewitz as a young officer in the 1920s. Eisenhower was greatly impressed by Clausewitz's example of a theoretical, idealized "absolute war" in Vom Kriege as a way of demonstrating how absurd it would be to attempt such a strategy in practice. For Eisenhower, the age of nuclear weapons had made what was for Clausewitz in the early-19th century only a theoretical vision an all too real possibility in the mid-20th century. From Eisenhower's viewpoint, the best deterrent to war was to show the world just how appalling and horrific a nuclear "absolute war" would be if it should ever occur, hence a series of much-publicized nuclear tests in the Pacific, giving first priority in the defense budget to nuclear weapons and to their delivery-systems over conventional weapons, and making repeated statements in public that the United States was able and willing at all times to use nuclear weapons. In this way, through the massive retaliation doctrine and the closely related foreign-policy concept of brinkmanship, Eisenhower hoped to hold out a credible vision of Clausewitzian nuclear "absolute war" to deter the Soviet Union and/or China from ever risking a war or even conditions that might lead to a war with the United States.

...Philanthropists may easily imagine there is a skillful method of disarming and overcoming an enemy without causing great bloodshed, and that this is the proper tendency of the art of War. However plausible this may appear, still it is an error which must be extirpated; for in such dangerous things as war, the errors which proceed from a spirit of benevolence are just the worst. As the use of physical power to the utmost extent by no means excludes the co-operation of the intelligence, it follows that he who uses force unsparingly, without reference to the quantity of bloodshed, must obtain a superiority if his adversary does not act likewise. By such means the former dictates the law to the latter, and both proceed to extremities, to which the only limitations are those imposed by the amount of counteracting force on each side.

— Clausewitz, On War, Book I, Chapter 1

After 1970, some theorists claimed that nuclear proliferation made Clausewitzian concepts obsolete after the 20th-century period in which they dominated the world. John E. Sheppard Jr., argues that by developing nuclear weapons, state-based conventional armies simultaneously both perfected their original purpose, to destroy a mirror image of themselves, and made themselves obsolete. No two powers have used nuclear weapons against each other, instead using diplomacy, conventional means, or proxy wars to settle disputes. If such a conflict did occur, presumably both combatants would be annihilated. Heavily influenced by the war in Vietnam and by antipathy to American strategist Henry Kissinger, the American biologist, musician, and game-theorist Anatol Rapoport argued in 1968 that a Clausewitzian view of war was not only obsolete in the age of nuclear weapons, but also highly dangerous as it promoted a "zero-sum paradigm" to international relations and a "dissolution of rationality" amongst decision-makers.

The end of the 20th century and the beginning of the 21st century have seen many instances of state armies attempting to suppress insurgencies and terrorism, and engaging in other forms of asymmetrical warfare. Clausewitz did not focus solely on wars between countries with well-defined armies. The era of the French Revolution and Napoleon was full of revolutions, rebellions, and violence by "non-state actors" – witness the wars in the French Vendée and in Spain. Clausewitz wrote a series of "Lectures on Small War" and studied the rebellion in the Vendée (1793–1796) and the Tyrolean uprising of 1809. In his famous "Bekenntnisdenkschrift" of 1812 he called for a "Spanish war in Germany" and laid out a comprehensive guerrilla strategy to be waged against Napoleon. In On War he included a famous chapter on "The People in Arms".

One prominent critic of Clausewitz is the Israeli military historian Martin van Creveld. In his 1991 book The Transformation of War, Creveld argued that Clausewitz's famous "Trinity" of people, army, and government was an obsolete socio-political construct based on the state, which was rapidly passing from the scene as the key player in war, and that he (Creveld) had constructed a new "non-trinitarian" model for modern warfare. Creveld's work has had great influence. Daniel Moran replied, 'The most egregious misrepresentation of Clausewitz's famous metaphor must be that of Martin van Creveld, who has declared Clausewitz to be an apostle of Trinitarian War, by which he means, incomprehensibly, a war of 'state against state and army against army,' from which the influence of the people is entirely excluded." Christopher Bassford went further, noting that one need only read the paragraph in which Clausewitz defined his Trinity to see

"that the words 'people,' 'army,' and 'government' appear nowhere at all in the list of the Trinity's components.... Creveld's and Keegan's assault on Clausewitz's Trinity is not only a classic 'blow into the air,' i.e., an assault on a position Clausewitz doesn't occupy. It is also a pointless attack on a concept that is quite useful in its own right. In any case, their failure to read the actual wording of the theory they so vociferously attack, and to grasp its deep relevance to the phenomena they describe, is hard to credit."

Some have gone further and suggested that Clausewitz's best-known aphorism, that war is a continuation of policy with other means, is not only irrelevant today but also inapplicable historically. For an opposing view see the sixteen essays presented in Clausewitz in the Twenty-First Century edited by Hew Strachan and Andreas Herberg-Rothe.

In military academies, schools, and universities worldwide, Clausewitz's Vom Kriege is often (usually in translation) mandatory reading.

Some theorists of management look to Clausewitz—just as some look to Sun Tzu—to bolster ideas on the concept of leadership.

The Swedish Paradox Development Studio (PDS), a studio focused on creating grand strategy games, has named one of their main videogame engines Clausewitz, in reference to the Prussian officer.

== See also ==
- August Otto Rühle von Lilienstern – Prussian officer from whom Clausewitz allegedly took, without acknowledgement, several important ideas (including that about war as pursuing political aims) made famous in On War. However, substantial basis for assuming common influences exist, most prominently Scharnhorst, who was Clausewitz's "second father" and professional mentor. This provokes skepticism of the claim the ideas were plagiarized from Lilienstern.
- Famous military writers
  - Niccolò Machiavelli – The Prince
  - Antoine-Henri Jomini
  - B. H. Liddell Hart
  - Sun Tzu
  - Maurice de Saxe
- Absolute war
- Operation Clausewitz
- Philosophy of war
- Principles of war
- Strategic studies
- U.S. Army Strategist
