= Total war =

Conflict in which all of a nation's resources are deployed

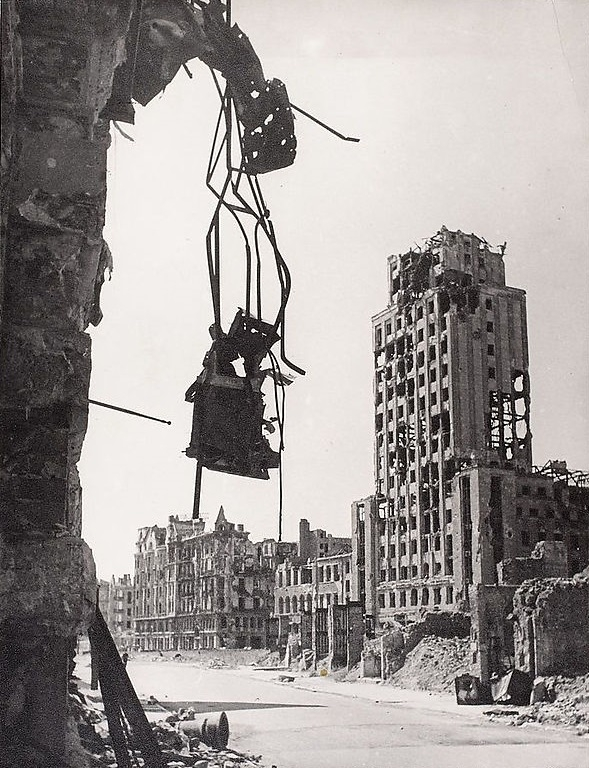
Ruins of Warsaw's Napoleon Square in the aftermath of World War II

Total war is a type of warfare where all national resources are mobilised to sustain the war effort (particularly through war production), blurring the line between military and civilians, and legitimising attacks on civilian targets as part of a war that is "unrestricted in terms of the weapons used, the territory or combatants involved, or the objectives pursued, especially one in which the laws of war are disregarded."

Under a total war approach to armed conflict, "all aspects of the enemy—its people, its infrastructure, its economy—are legitimate [military] targets."

In the mid-19th century, scholars identified what later became known as total war as a separate class of warfare. In a total war, they argued, the differentiation between combatants and civilians diminishes due to the capacity of opposing sides to consider nearly every human, including non-combatants, as resources that are used in the war effort.

== Etymology ==
The phrase "total war" seemingly originated amongst French writers during World War I and French writer Léon Daudet published a collection of essays called La Guerre Totale ("The total war") in 1918. The phrase was popularised by the 1935 publication of German general Erich Ludendorff's World War I memoir, Der totale Krieg ("The total war"). Some authors extend the concept back as far as classic work of Carl von Clausewitz, On War, as "absoluter Krieg" (absolute war), even though he did not use the term; others interpret Clausewitz differently. Total war also describes the French "guerre à outrance" during the Franco-Prussian War.

In his 24 December 1864 letter to his chief of staff, Union general William Tecumseh Sherman wrote that the Union was "not only fighting hostile armies, but a hostile people, and must make old and young, rich and poor, feel the hard hand of war, as well as their organized armies," defending Sherman's March to the Sea, the operation that inflicted widespread destruction of infrastructure in Georgia. Sherman's March to the Sea in the American Civil War (15 November 1864 – 21 December 1864) is sometimes considered to be an example of total war, for which Sherman used the term hard war. Some historians challenge this designation, as Sherman's campaign assaulted primarily military targets and Sherman ordered his men to spare civilian homes.

United States Air Force general Curtis LeMay updated the concept for the nuclear age. In 1949, he first proposed that a total war in the nuclear age would consist of delivering the entire nuclear arsenal in a single overwhelming blow, going as far as "killing a nation".

== Background ==
Although a 20th century expression, "total war" has become the common term "encapsulating the earlier ideas of a nation in arms and people's war that emerged from the American and European revolutions of the late 18th and early 19th centuries."

"According to these nationalistic doctrines, war was no longer the sole domain of military professionals and warrior elites. An entire people could fight for their nation. American and French revolutionaries held up the citizen soldier as an ideal and called for a nation in arms with universal military service for men." A vivid example of a people's war was the "popular uprising and prolonged guerilla struggle in the face of Napoleon's attempt to place his brother on the Spanish throne [which] provided ... a mass movement from beneath which revolutionaries would continue to promote as a means to rid a people of an illegitimate regime."

However, these "grandiose visions of mobilization left little room for the notion of innocent noncombatants uninvolved in the fight."

== Characteristics ==
Total war is a concept that has been extensively studied by scholars of conflict and war. One of the most notable contributions to this field of research is the work of Stig Förster, who has identified four dimensions of total war: total purposes, total methods, total mobilisation, and total control. Tiziano Peccia has built upon Förster's work by adding a fifth dimension of "total change." Peccia argues that total war not only has a profound impact on the outcome of the conflict but also produces significant changes in the political, cultural, economic, and social realms beyond the end of the conflict. As Peccia puts it, "total war is an earthquake that has the world as its epicenter."

The four dimensions of total war identified by Förster are:

- 1) Total purposes: The aim of continuous growth of the power of the parties involved and hegemonic visions.
- 2) Total methods: Similar and common methodologies among countries that intend to increase their spheres of influence.
- 3) Total mobilisation: Inclusion in the conflict of parties not traditionally involved, such as women and children or individuals who are not part of the armed bodies.
- 4) Total control: Multisectoral centralisation of the powers and orchestration of the activities of the countries in a small circle of dictators or oligarchs, with cross-functional control over education and culture, media/propaganda, economic, and political activities.

Peccia's contribution of "total change" adds to this framework by emphasising the long-term effects of total war on society.

- 5) Total change: This includes changes in social attitudes, cultural norms, and political structures, as well as economic and technological developments.

In Peccia's view, total war not only transforms the military and political landscape but also has far-reaching and long-time implications for society as a whole.

Actions that may characterise the post-19th century concept of total war include:

- Strategic bombing, as during World War II, the Korean War, and the Vietnam War (Operations Barrel Roll, Rolling Thunder and Linebacker II)
- Blockade and besieging of population centres, as with the Allied blockade of Germany, the Siege of Leningrad during the First and Second World Wars, and the Israeli blockade of the Gaza Strip, a component of the Gaza genocide.
- Scorched earth policy, as with the March to the Sea during the American Civil War and the Japanese "Three Alls Policy" during the Second Sino-Japanese War
- Commerce raiding, tonnage war, and unrestricted submarine warfare, as with privateering, the German U-boat campaigns of the First and Second World Wars, and the United States submarine campaign against Japan during World War II
- Collective punishment, pacification operations, and reprisals against populations deemed hostile, as with the execution and deportation of suspected Communards following the fall of the 1871 Paris Commune or the German reprisal policy targeting resistance movements, insurgents, and Untermenschen such as in France (e.g. Maillé massacre) and Poland during World War II
- Industrial warfare, as with all belligerents in their respective home fronts during World War I and World War II
- The use of civilians and prisoners of war as forced labour for military operations, as with Japan, USSR and Germany's massive use of forced labourers of other nations during World War II (see Slavery in Japan and forced labour under German rule during World War II)
- Giving no quarter (i.e. take no prisoners), as with Hitler's Commando Order during World War II

== History ==
=== Middle Ages ===
Written by academics at Eastern Michigan University, the Cengage Advantage Books: World History textbook claims that while total war "is traditionally associated with the two global wars of the twentieth century ... it would seem that instances of total war predate the twentieth century." They write:

As an aggressor nation, the ancient Mongols, no less than the modern Nazis, practiced total war against an enemy by organizing all available resources, including military personnel, non-combatant workers, intelligence, transport, money, and provisions.

=== 18th and 19th centuries ===
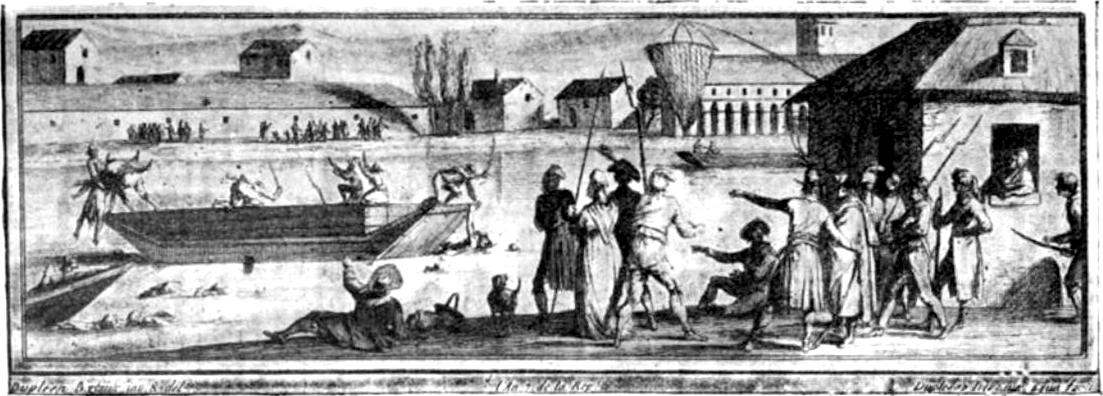
The drownings at Savenay during the War in the Vendée, 1793

==== Europe ====
In his book, The First Total War: Napoleon's Europe and the Birth of Warfare as We Know it (2007), David A. Bell, a French History professor at Princeton University argued that the French Revolutionary Wars introduced to mainland Europe some of the first concepts of total war, such as Levée en masse (mass conscription). He claimed that the new republic found itself threatened by a powerful coalition of European nations and used the entire nation's resources in an unprecedented war effort that included mass conscription. By 23 August 1793, the French front line forces grew to some 800,000 with a total of 1.5 million in all services—the first time an army in excess of a million had been mobilised in Western history:

From this moment until such time as its enemies shall have been driven from the soil of the Republic all Frenchmen are in permanent requisition for the services of the armies. The young men shall fight; the married men shall forge arms and transport provisions; the women shall make tents and clothes and shall serve in the hospitals; the children shall turn old lint into linen; the old men shall betake themselves to the public squares in order to arouse the courage of the warriors and preach hatred of kings and the unity of the Republic.

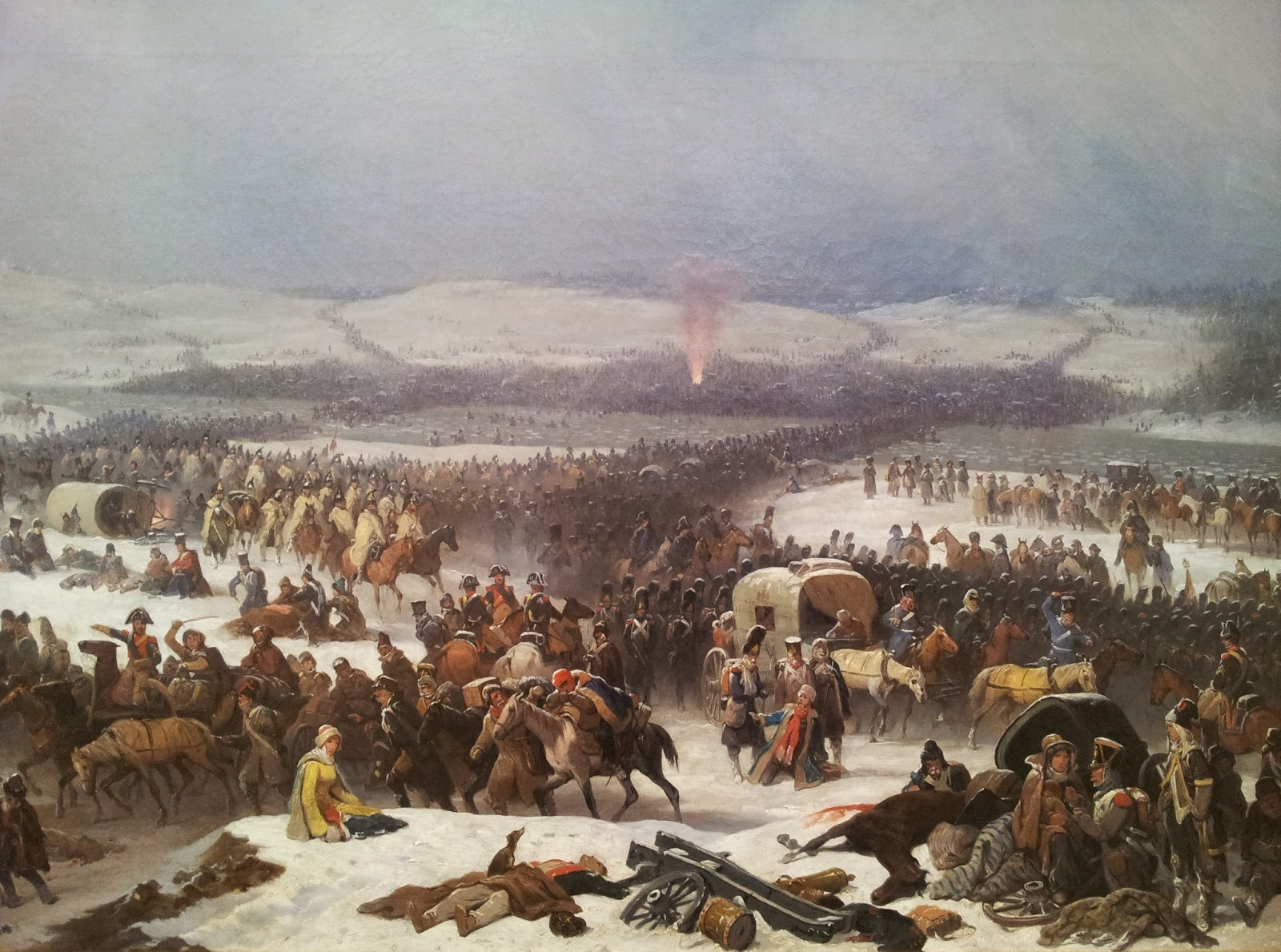
Napoleon's retreat from Russia in 1812. Napoleon's Grande Armée had lost about half a million men.

During the Russian campaign of 1812 the Russians retreated while destroying infrastructure and agriculture in order to effectively hamper the French and strip them of adequate supplies. In the campaign of 1813, Allied forces in the German theatre alone amounted to nearly one million whilst two years later in the Hundred Days a French decree called for the total mobilisation of some 2.5 million men (though at most a fifth of this was managed by the time of the French defeat at Waterloo). During the prolonged Peninsular War from 1808 to 1814 some 300,000 French troops were kept permanently occupied by, in addition to several hundred thousand Spanish, Portuguese and British regulars, an enormous and sustained guerrilla insurgency—ultimately French deaths would amount to 300,000 in the Peninsular War alone.

The Franco-Prussian War was fought in breach of the recently signed Geneva Convention of 1864, when "European opinion increasingly expected that civilians and soldiers should be treated humanely in war".

==== North America ====
The Sullivan Expedition of 1779 was an example of total warfare. As Native American and Loyalist forces massacred American farmers, killed livestock and burned buildings in remote frontier areas, General George Washington sent General John Sullivan with 4,000 troops to seek "the total destruction and devastation of their settlements" in upstate New York. There was only one small battle as the expedition devastated "14 towns and most flourishing crops of corn." The Native Americans escaped to Canada where the British fed them; they remained there after the war.

Sherman's March to the Sea in the American Civil War—from 15 November 1864, through 21 December 1864—is sometimes considered to be an example of total war, for which Sherman used the term hard war. Some historians challenge this designation, as Sherman's campaign assaulted primarily military targets and Sherman ordered his men to spare civilian homes.

==== South America ====
Historian Milda Rivarola from Harvard University states that the Paraguayan War (from 1864 to 1870) was the first total war of the American continent, citing both Paraguay's vision of victory or utter defeat and mobilising the whole of Paraguayan society, economy and territory.

=== World War I ===
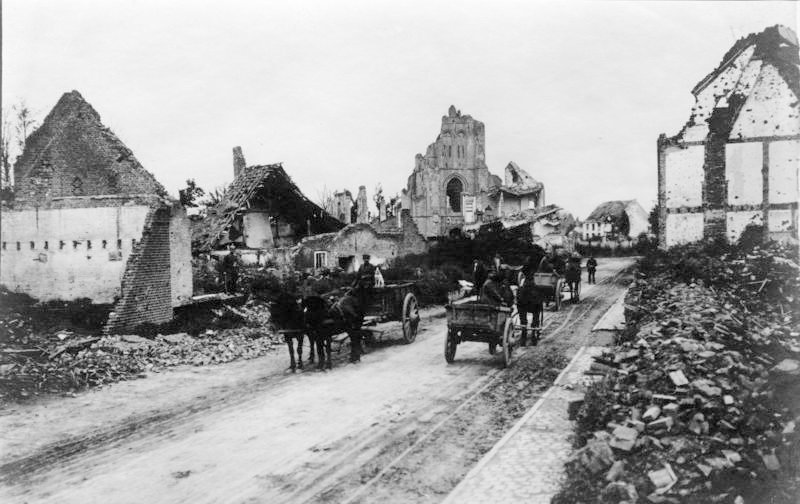
Damage and destruction of civilian buildings in Belgium, 1914

==== Air Warfare ====
Bombing civilians from the air was adopted as a strategy for the first time in World War I, and a leading advocate of this strategy was Peter Strasser "Leader of Airships" (Führer der Luftschiffe; F.d.L.). Strasser, who was chief commander of German Imperial Navy Zeppelins during World War I, the main force operating German strategic bombing across Europe and the UK, saw bombing of civilians as well as military targets as an essential element of total war. He argued that causing civilian casualties and damaging domestic infrastructure served both as propaganda and as a means of diverting resources from the front line.

We who strike the enemy where his heart beats have been slandered as 'baby killers' ... Nowadays, there is no such animal as a noncombatant. Modern warfare is total warfare.

— Peter Strasser

==== Propaganda ====
One of the features of total war in Britain was the use of government propaganda posters to divert all attention to the war on the home front. Posters were used to influence public opinion about what to eat and what occupations to take, and to change the attitude of support towards the war effort. Even music halls were used as propaganda, with propaganda songs aimed at recruitment.

After the failure of the Battle of Neuve Chapelle, the large British offensive in March 1915, the British Commander-in-Chief Field Marshal John French blamed the lack of progress on insufficient and poor-quality artillery shells. This led to the Shell Crisis of 1915 which brought down both the Liberal government and Premiership of H. H. Asquith. He formed a new coalition government dominated by Liberals and appointed David Lloyd George as Minister of Munitions. It was a recognition that the whole economy would have to be geared for war if the Allies were to prevail on the Western Front.

Carl Schmitt, a supporter of Nazi Germany, wrote that total war meant "total politics"—authoritarian domestic policies that imposed direct control of the press and economy. In Schmitt's view the total state, which directs fully the mobilisation of all social and economic resources to war, is antecedent to total war. Scholars consider that the seeds of this total state concept already existed in the German state of World War I, which exercised full control of the press and other aspects economic and social life as espoused in the statement of state ideology known as the "Ideas of 1914".

==== Rationing ====
As young men left the farms for the front, domestic food production in Britain and Germany fell. In Britain, the response was to import more food, which was done despite the German introduction of unrestricted submarine warfare, and to introduce rationing. The Royal Navy's blockade of German ports prevented Germany from importing food and hastened German capitulation by creating a food crisis in Germany.

Almost the whole of Europe and some of the European colonial empires mobilised soldiers. Rationing occurred on the home fronts. Bulgaria went so far as to mobilise a quarter of its population, or 800,000 people, a greater share of its population than any other country during the war.

=== World War II ===
The Second World War was the quintessential total war of modernity. The level of national mobilisation of resources on all sides of the conflict, the battlespace being contested, the scale of the armies, navies, and air forces raised through conscription, the active targeting of non-combatants (and non-combatant property), the general disregard for collateral damage, and the unrestricted aims of the belligerents marked total war on an unprecedented and unsurpassed, multicontinental scale.

==== Imperial Japan ====
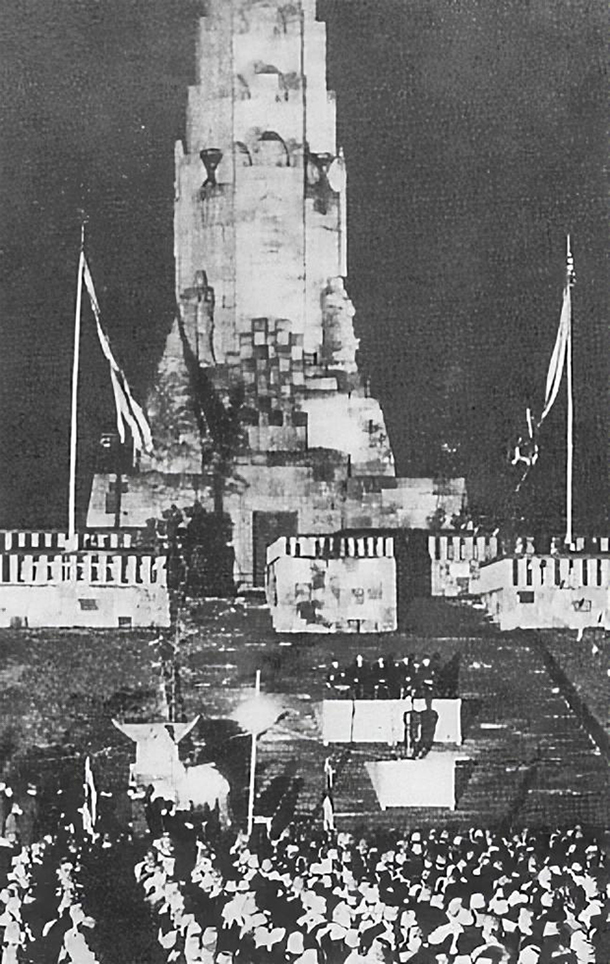
Founding ceremony of the Hakkō ichiu Monument, promoting the unification of "the 8 corners of the world under one roof"

During the first part of the Shōwa era, the government of Imperial Japan launched a string of policies to promote a total war effort against China and occidental powers and increase industrial production. Among these were the National Spiritual Mobilization Movement and the Imperial Rule Assistance Association.

The State General Mobilization Law had fifty clauses, which provided for government controls over civilian organisations (including labour unions), nationalisation of strategic industries, price controls and rationing, and nationalised the news media. The laws gave the government the authority to use unlimited budgets to subsidise war production and to compensate manufacturers for losses caused by war-time mobilisation. Some articles outlined penalties for violators.

To improve its production, Imperial Japan used millions of slave labourers and pressed more than 18 million people in East Asia into forced labour.

==== United Kingdom ====
Before the onset of the Second World War, Great Britain drew on its First World War experience to prepare legislation that would allow immediate mobilisation of the economy for war, should future hostilities break out. Rationing of most goods and services was introduced, not only for consumers but also for manufacturers. This meant that factories manufacturing products that were irrelevant to the war effort had more appropriate tasks imposed. All artificial light was subject to legal blackouts.

...There is another more obvious difference from 1914. The whole of the warring nations are engaged, not only soldiers, but the entire population, men, women and children. The fronts are everywhere to be seen. The trenches are dug in the towns and streets. Every village is fortified. Every road is barred. The front line runs through the factories. The workmen are soldiers with different weapons but the same courage.

— Winston Churchill on the radio, June 18; and House of Commons 20 August 1940:

Not only were men conscripted into the armed forces from the beginning of the war (something which had not happened until the middle of World War I), but women were also conscripted as Land Girls to aid farmers and the Bevin Boys were conscripted to work down the coal mines.

Enormous casualties were expected in bombing raids, so children were evacuated from London and other cities en masse to the countryside for compulsory billeting in households. In the long term this was one of the most profound and longer-lasting social consequences of the whole war for Britain. This is because it mixed up children with adults of other classes. Not only did the middle and upper classes become familiar with the urban squalor suffered by working class children from the slums, but the children got a chance to see animals and the countryside, often for the first time, and experience rural life.

The use of statistical analysis, by a branch of science which has become known as Operational Research to influence military tactics, was a departure from anything previously attempted. It was a very powerful tool but it further dehumanised war particularly when it suggested strategies that were counter-intuitive. Examples, where statistical analysis directly influenced tactics include the work done by Patrick Blackett's team on the optimum size and speed of convoys and the introduction of bomber streams, by the Royal Air Force to counter the night fighter defences of the Kammhuber Line.

==== Nazi Germany ====
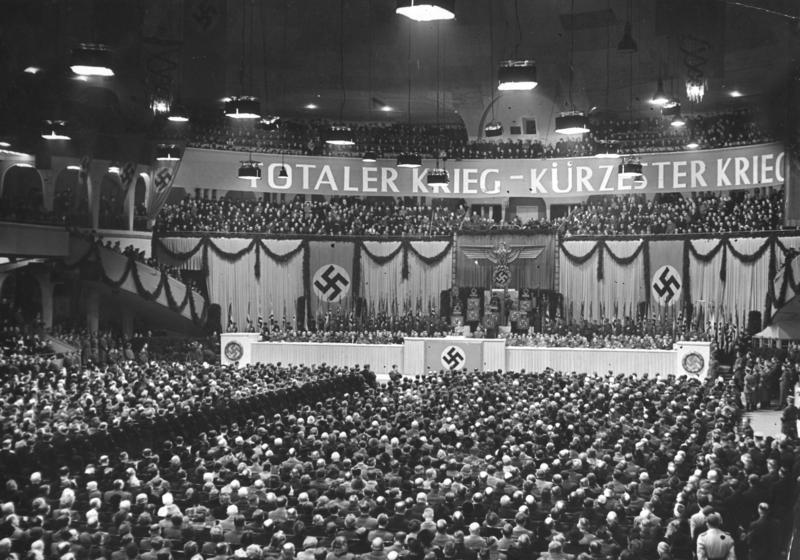
Nazi rally on 18 February 1943 at the Berlin Sportpalast; the sign says "Totaler Krieg – Kürzester Krieg" ("Total War – Shortest War")

In 1935 General Ludendorff in the book Der Totale Krieg gave life to the term "Total War" in the German lexicon. However, being followers of the stab-in-the-back myth, military and Nazi leadership believed that Germany hadn't lost World War I on the battlefield but solely on the home front.

Therefore, Germany started the war under the concept which was later named blitzkrieg. Officially, it did not accept that it was in a total war until Joseph Goebbels' Sportpalast speech of 18 February 1943—in which the crowd was told "Totaler Krieg – Kürzester Krieg" ("Total War – Shortest War".)

Goebbels and Hitler had spoken in March 1942 about Goebbels' idea to put the entire home front on a war footing. Hitler appeared to accept the concept, but took no action. Goebbels had the support of minister of armaments Albert Speer, economics minister Walther Funk and Robert Ley, head of the German Labour Front, and they pressed Hitler in October 1942 to take action, but Hitler, while outwardly agreeing, continued to dither. Finally, after the holidays in 1942, Hitler sent his powerful personal secretary, Martin Bormann, to discuss the question with Goebbels and Hans Lammers, the head of the Reich Chancellery. As a result, Bormann told Goebbels to go ahead and draw up a draft of the necessary decree, to be signed in January 1943. Hitler signed the decree on 13 January, almost a year after Goebbels first discussed the concept with him. The decree set up a steering committee consisting of Bormann, Lammers, and General Wilhelm Keitel to oversee the effort, with Goebbels and Speer as advisors; Goebbels had expected to be one of the triumvirate. Hitler remained aloof from the project, and it was Goebbels and Hermann Göring who gave the "total war" radio address from the Sportspalast the next month, on the 10th anniversary of the Nazi seizure of power.

I ask you: Do you want total war? If necessary, do you want a war more total and radical than anything that we can even imagine today?

— Nazi propaganda minister Joseph Goebbels, 18 February 1943, in his Sportpalast speech

The commitment to the doctrine of the short war was a continuing handicap for the Germans; neither plans nor state of mind were adjusted to the idea of a long war until the failure of Operation Barbarossa. A major strategic defeat in the Battle of Moscow led Speer to nationalise German war production.

==== Canada ====
In Canada early use of the term concerned whether or not the country was committing enough to mobilising its resources, rather than whether or not to target civilians of the enemy countries. During the early days of the Second World War, whether or not Canada was committed to a "total war effort" was point of partisan political debate between the governing Liberals and the opposition Conservatives. The Conservatives elected as their national leader Arthur Meighen, who had been the cabinet minister responsible for implementing conscription during the First World War, and advocated for conscription again. Prime Minister W.L. Mackenzie King argued that Canada could still be said to have a "total war effort" without conscription, and delivered nationally broadcast speeches to this effect 1942. Meighen failed to win his seat in by-election in 1942, and the issue subsided for a short time. But eventually, national conscription was introduced in Canada in 1944, as well as dramatically increased taxation, another symbol of the "total war effort".

==== Soviet Union ====
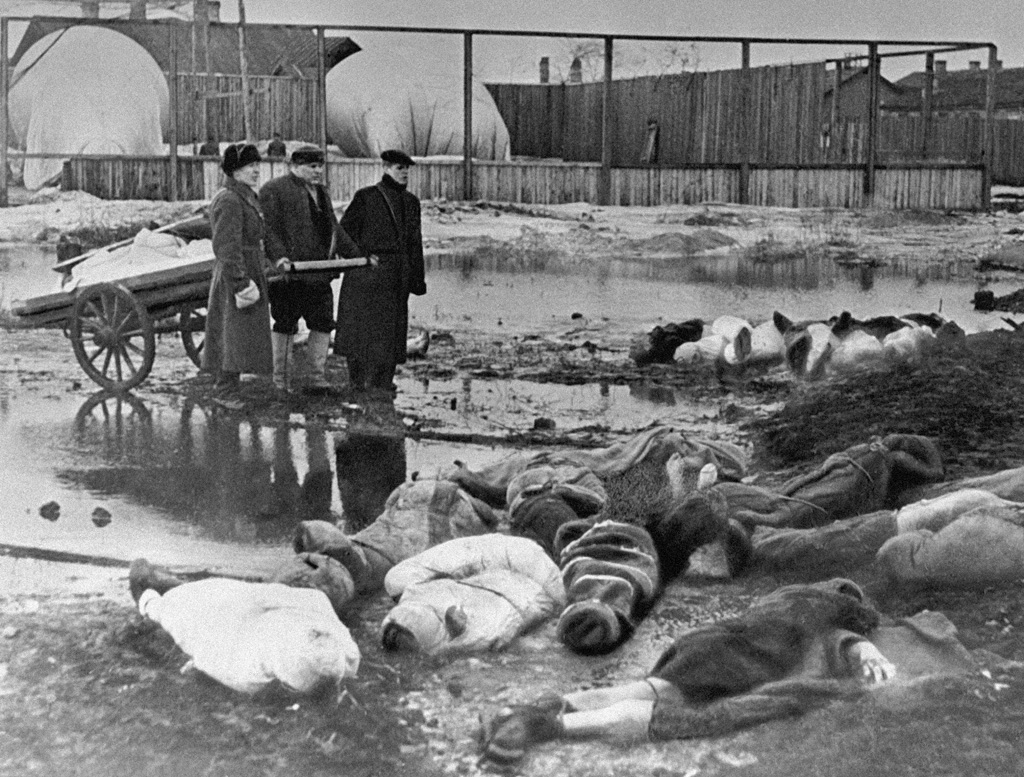
Three men burying victims of Leningrad's siege, in which about 1 million civilians died

The Soviet Union (USSR) was a command economy which already had an economic and legal system allowing the economy and society to be redirected into fighting a total war. The transportation of factories, and whole labour forces east of the Urals as the Germans advanced across the USSR in 1941, was an impressive feat of planning. Only those factories which were useful for war production were moved because of the total war commitment of the Soviet government.

The Eastern Front of the European Theatre of World War II encompassed the conflict in central and eastern Europe from 22 June 1941, to 9 May 1945. It was the largest theatre of war in history in terms of numbers of soldiers, equipment and casualties and was notorious for its unprecedented ferocity, destruction, and immense loss of life (see World War II casualties). The fighting involved millions of German, Hungarian, Romanian and Soviet troops along a broad front hundreds of kilometres long. It was by far the deadliest single theatre of World War II. Scholars now believe that at most 27 million Soviet citizens died during the war, including at least 8.7 million soldiers who fell in battle against Hitler's armies or died in POW camps. Millions of civilians died from starvation, exposure, atrocities, and massacres. The Axis lost over 5 million soldiers in the east as well as many thousands of civilians.

During the Battle of Stalingrad, newly built T-34 tanks were driven—unpainted because of a paint shortage—from the factory floor straight to the front. This came to symbolise the USSR's commitment to a policy of total war.

==== United States ====
The United States underwent an unprecedented mobilisation of national resources for the Second World War, creating a military-industrial complex. Although the United States was not in existential danger, the national sense after Pearl Harbor was to use all of the nation's resources to defeat Germany and Japan. Most non-essential activities were rationed, prohibited or restrained, and most fit, unmarried young men were drafted. There was little urgency before 1940, when the collapse of France ended the Phoney War and revealed urgent needs. Nevertheless, President Franklin Roosevelt moved to first solidify public opinion before acting. In 1940 the first peacetime draft was instituted, along with Lend-Lease programs to aid the British, and covert aid was passed to the Chinese as well. American public opinion was still opposed to involvement in the problems of Europe and Asia, however. In 1941, the Soviet Union became the latest nation to be invaded, and the US gave its aid as well. American ships began defending aid convoys to the Allied nations against submarine attacks, and a total trade embargo against the Empire of Japan was instituted to deny its military the raw materials its factories and military forces required to continue its offensive actions in China.

In late 1941, Japan's Army-dominated government decided to seize by military force the strategic resources of South-East Asia and Indonesia since the Western powers would not give Japan these goods by trade. Planning for this action included surprise attacks on American and British forces in Hong Kong, the Philippines, Malaya, and the US naval base and warships at Pearl Harbor. In response to these attacks, the UK and US declared war the next day. Nazi Germany declared war on the US a few days later, along with Fascist Italy; the US found itself fully involved in a second world war.

As the United States began to gear up for a major war, information and propaganda efforts were set in motion. Civilians (including children) were encouraged to take part in fat, grease, and scrap metal collection drives. Many factories making non-essential goods retooled for war production. Levels of industrial productivity previously unheard of were attained during the war; multi-thousand-ton convoy ships were routinely built in a month and a half, and tanks poured out of the former automobile factories. Within a few years of the US entry into the Second World War, nearly every man without children fit for service, between 18 and 30, was conscripted into the military "for the duration" of the conflict, and unprecedented numbers of women took up jobs previously held by them. Strict systems of rationing of consumer staples were introduced to redirect productive capacity to war needs.

Previously untouched sections of the nation mobilised for the war effort. Academics became technocrats; home-makers became bomb-makers (massive numbers of women worked in industry during the war); union leaders and businessmen became commanders in the massive armies of production. The great scientific communities of the United States were mobilised as never before, and mathematicians, doctors, engineers, and chemists turned their minds to the problems ahead of them.

By the war's end, a multitude of advances had been made in medicine, physics, engineering, and the other sciences. This included the efforts of the theoretical physicists working at the Los Alamos National Laboratory on the Manhattan Project, which led to the Trinity nuclear test and thus brought about the Atomic Age.

In the war, the United States lost 407,316 military personnel, but had managed to avoid the extensive level of damage to civilian and industrial infrastructure that other participants suffered. The US emerged as one of the two superpowers after the war.

==== Unconditional surrender ====
Actually Dresden was a mass of munitions works, an intact government centre, and a key transportation point to the East. It is now none of these things.

— Air Chief Marshal Arthur Harris, in a memo to the Air Ministry on 29 March 1945

After the United States entered World War II, Franklin D. Roosevelt declared at Casablanca Conference to the other Allies and the press that unconditional surrender was the objective of the war against the Axis Powers of Germany, Italy, and Japan. Prior to this declaration, the individual regimes of the Axis Powers could have negotiated an armistice similar to that at the end of World War I and then a conditional surrender when they perceived that the war was lost.

The unconditional surrender of the major Axis powers caused a legal problem at the post-war Nuremberg Trials, because the trials appeared to be in conflict with Articles 63 and 64 of the Geneva Convention of 1929. Usually if such trials are held, they would be held under the auspices of the defeated power's own legal system as happened with some of the minor Axis powers, for example in the post-World War II Romanian People's Tribunals. To circumvent this, the Allies argued that the major war criminals were captured after the end of the war, so they were not prisoners of war and the Geneva Conventions did not cover them. Further, the collapse of the Axis regimes created a legal condition of total defeat (debellatio) so the provisions of the 1907 Hague Convention over military occupation were not applicable.

=== Post-World War II ===
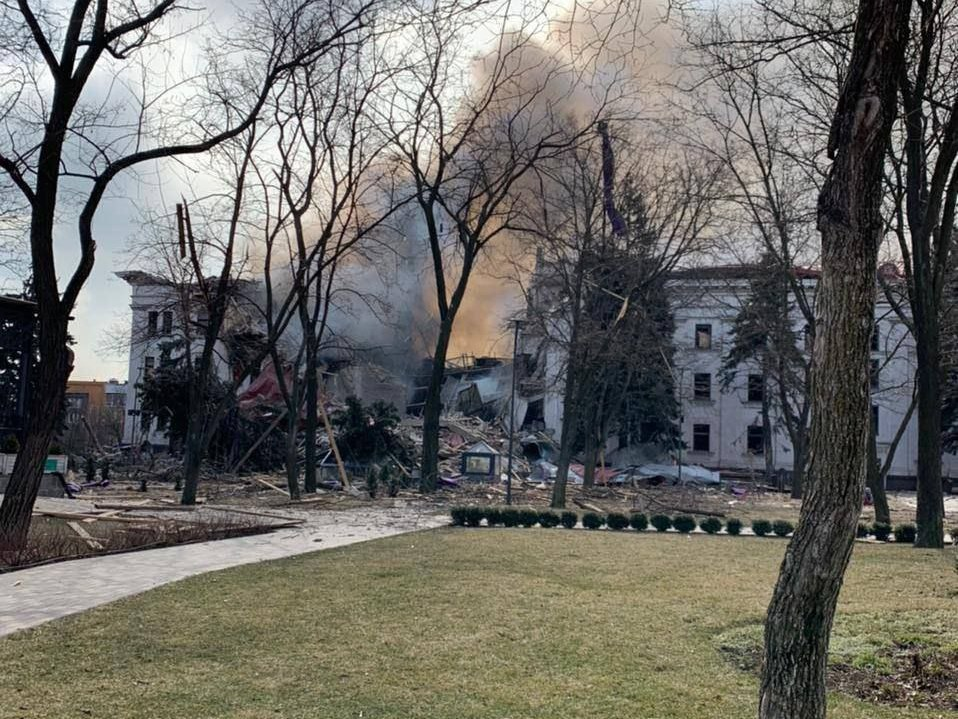
Donetsk Academic Regional Drama Theater (Mariupol) after Russian bombing during the Russo-Ukrainian war

Since the end of World War II, no industrial nation has fought such a large, decisive war. This is likely due to the availability of nuclear weapons, whose destructive power and quick deployment render a full mobilisation of a country's resources such as in World War II logistically impractical and strategically irrelevant.

==== Korean War ====
Sahr Conway-Lanz, an expert on American diplomacy after World War II, has discussed the elasticity of American definitions of what constituted a "military target." He has stated that:

During the [Korean War], American military and civilian officials stretched the term "military target," to include virtually all human-made structures, capitalizing on the vague distinction between the military and civilian segments of an enemy society. They came to apply the logic of total war to the destruction of the civil infrastructure of North Korea. Because almost any building could serve a military purpose, even if a minor one, nearly the entire physical infrastructure behind enemy lines was deemed a military target and open to attack. This expansive definition ... worked to obscure in American awareness the suffering of Korean civilians to which U.S. firepower was contributing.

==== Cold War ====
By the end of the 1950s, the ideological stand-off of the Cold War between the Western world and the Soviet Union had resulted in thousands of nuclear weapons being aimed by each side at the other. Strategically, the equal balance of destructive power possessed by each side manifests in the doctrine of mutually assured destruction (MAD), which determines that a nuclear attack by one superpower would result in a nuclear counter-strike by the other. This would result in hundreds of millions of deaths in a world where, in words widely attributed to Nikita Khrushchev, "The living will envy the dead".

During the Cold War, the two superpowers sought to avoid open conflict between their respective forces, as both sides recognised that such a clash could very easily escalate, and quickly involve nuclear weapons. Instead, the superpowers fought each other through their involvement in proxy wars, military buildups, and diplomatic standoffs.

In the case of proxy wars, each superpower supported its respective allies in conflicts with forces aligned with the other superpower, such as in the Vietnam War and the Soviet invasion of Afghanistan. Nonetheless, there are cases of states enduring total war who were not nuclear powers nor closer allies, such as the 1980s Iraq-Iran conflict.

== Later and contemporary conflicts ==
The following post-World War II conflicts have been characterised as "total war":

- 1948 Arab–Israeli War (1948–1949)
- Iran–Iraq War (1980–1988)
- Russo-Ukrainian war (2022–present)
- Gaza war (2023–present)

== See also ==
- Black-and-white dualism
- The bomber will always get through
- Cannon fodder
- Carthaginian peace
- Conventional warfare
- Disarmament
- Economic warfare
- Psychology of genocide
- Roerich Pact
- Terrorism
- Trench warfare
- War economy
- War of annihilation
