= R. M. Johnston =

R. M. Johnston may refer to:

- Robert Mackenzie Johnston (1843–1918), Scottish-Australian statistician and naturalist
- Rienzi Melville Johnston (1849–1926), American journalist and politician
- Robert Matteson Johnston (1867–1920), American historian
