= Percy Groves =

British RAF strategist

- Born: Percy Robert Clifford Groves; 26 May 1878; Rai Bareli, India
- Died: 12 August 1959 (aged 81); Mombasa, Kenya
- Military career
- Allegiance: United Kingdom
- Branch: British Army (1899–1918); Royal Air Force (1918–1946)
- Service years: 1899–1922; 1939–1946
- Rank: Brigadier-General
- Conflicts: Second Boer War; First World War
- Awards: Companion of the Order of the Bath; Companion of the Order of St Michael and St George; Distinguished Service Order; Order of the White Eagle, 3rd Class with Swords (Serbia); Commander of the Legion of Honour (France)

Brigadier-General Percy Robert Clifford Groves, CB, CMG, DSO (26 May 1878 – 12 August 1959) was a senior British air strategist who served in the British Army and the Royal Air Force (RAF). He campaigned for substantial reform of Britain's approach to air strategy following the First World War, in particular for an immediate expansion of the RAF to parity with the largest European force within striking distance. He was an advocate of the aerial "knock out blow": the possibility of ending a war in its early stages by launching a massive attack on the enemy's centres of gravity.

== Early life ==
Percy Robert Clifford Groves was born on 26 May 1878 at Rai Bareli, India. He was the eldest son of Joseph Groves who served as Commissioner of Railways for the United Provinces in India. He was educated at Bedford Modern School.

== Career ==
Groves joined the King's Shropshire Light Infantry where he was commissioned a second lieutenant on 18 October 1899. He served with the 2nd battalion of his regiment in the Second Boer War, and was promoted to lieutenant on 9 March 1901. The war in South Africa ended in May 1902, and he returned home later that year, on the SS Kildonan Castle in December 1902. He was employed with the West African Regiment (1903–04) and was Territorial Adjutant (1909–12). In 1914 he joined the Royal Flying Corps, serving with Air Services France (1914–15). On 29 April 1915, he received his Royal Aero Club Aviator's Certificate passing on a Maurice Farman Biplane at Farman Aerodrome, Étampes. He did much active flying in the Dardanelles (1915–16).

Between 1916 and 1918, he was Chief of Staff, Royal Flying Corps, in the Middle East "which then embraced four theatres of war". In 1918 he was made Director of Flying Operations at the Air Ministry. He was then Britain's Air Ministry Representative at the Paris Peace Conference (1919) and British air adviser to the Supreme Council and the Conference of Ambassadors (1921–22).

Groves retired from active service in 1922 with the rank of brigadier general. Based on his experiences on active service, Groves realised that Britain needed to radically rethink its approach to air strategy. Shortly after his retirement from the forces, he proceeded to campaign "for the creation of an effective striking force and for a proper regard for the patent realities of civil aviation". His opinions attracted the interest of Viscount Northcliffe and in 1922 a series of articles on "Our Future in the Air" were published in The Times. He remained a forceful campaigner for an immediate expansion of the RAF to parity with the largest European force within striking distance.

In 1939 Groves returned to active service being made Deputy Director of Intelligence at the Air Ministry with the rank of air commodore, a position he held until April 1940. He was then seconded to the Foreign Office before being demobilised in 1946.

== Military strategist ==
Groves was a colleague of Frederick Sykes and Viscount Trenchard, who both influenced his early military thinking. He was also engaged in lengthy correspondence with Sir Basil Liddell Hart. In terms of his military thinking, Groves was a proponent of the aerial "knock out blow": the possibility of ending a war in its early stages by launching a massive attack on the enemy's centres of gravity.

== Awards and honours ==
In the Second Boer War he was awarded the Queen's medal (4 clasps) and the King's medal (2 clasps).

During the First World War he was awarded the Distinguished Service Order in 1916. In the same year he was made Order of the White Eagle of Serbia, 3rd Class with Swords. He was made a Companion of the Order of St Michael and St George in 1918, a Companion of the Order of the Bath in 1919 and a Commander of the Legion of Honour in 1920.

Groves was an Associate Fellow of the Royal Aeronautical Society; Hon. Secretary General Air League of British Empire, and Editor of Air, 1927–29. He was group captain and honorary air commodore, RAFVR, September 1939.

== Personal life ==
Groves was a member of the United Service Club. In 1920 he married Suzanne, daughter of T.E. Steen of Oslo; they had one son. He died in Mombasa on 12 August 1959.

The National Portrait Gallery has numerous photographic portraits of Groves.

== Selected works ==
- Flying over Egypt, Sinai and Palestine, National Geographic, 1926
- Behind the Smoke Screen, 1934
- Our Future In The Air, 1935
