= Conventional warfare =

War between two states in open confrontation

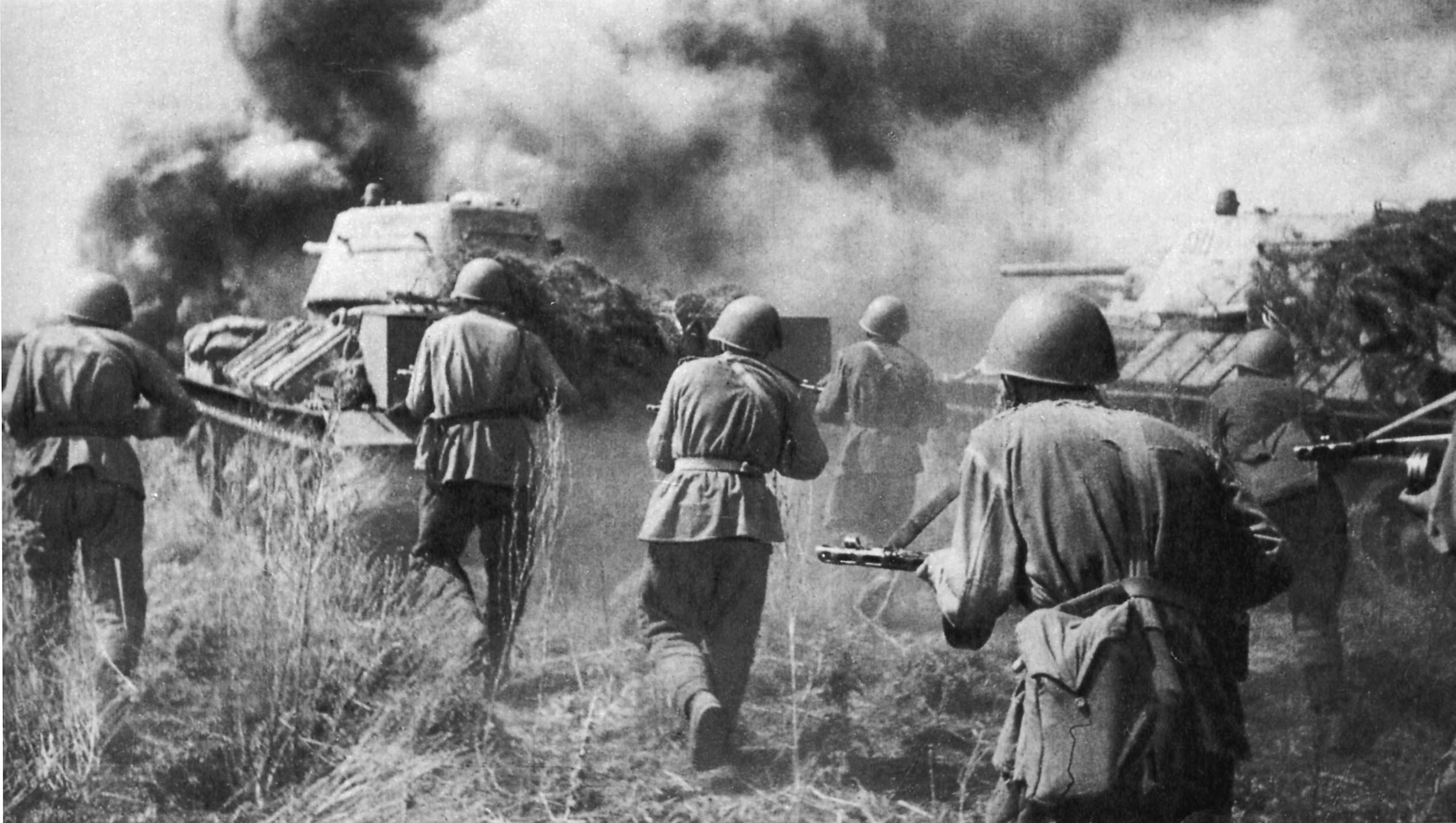
Soviet soldiers and tanks during the 1943 Battle of Kursk, one of the largest battles of World War II

Conventional warfare is a form of warfare conducted by using conventional weapons and battlefield tactics between two or more states in open confrontation. The forces on each side are well-defined and fight by using weapons that target primarily the opponent's military. It is normally fought by using conventional weapons, not chemical, biological, radiological, or nuclear weapons.

The general purpose of conventional warfare is to weaken or destroy the opponent's military, which negates its ability to engage in conventional warfare. In forcing capitulation, however, one or both sides may eventually resort to unconventional warfare tactics.

== History ==
=== Formation of state ===
The state was first advocated by Plato but found more acceptance in the consolidation of power under the Roman Catholic Church. European monarchs then gained power as the Catholic Church was stripped of temporal power and was replaced by the divine right of kings. In 1648, the powers of Europe signed the Treaty of Westphalia, which ended the religious violence for purely political governance and outlook, signifying the birth of the modern state.

Within the statist paradigm, only the state and its appointed representatives may bear arms and enter into war. In fact, war then became understood only as a conflict between sovereign states. Monarchs strengthened that idea and gave it the force of law. Any noble had been allowed to start a war, but European monarchs had to consolidate military power in response to the Napoleonic Wars.

=== Clausewitzian paradigm ===
Prussia was one of the countries that tried to amass military power. Carl von Clausewitz, one of Prussia's officers, wrote On War, a work rooted solely in the world of the state. All other forms of intrastate conflict, such as rebellion, are not accounted for because in theoretical terms, he could not account for warfare before the state. However, near the end of his life, he grew increasingly aware of the importance of non-state military actors, as is revealed in his conceptions of "the people in arms", which he noted arose from the same social and political sources as traditional interstate warfare.

Practices such as raiding or blood feuds were then labeled criminal activities and stripped of legitimacy. That war paradigm reflected the view of most of the modernized world in the early 21st century, as is verified by examination of the conventional armies of the time: large, high-maintenance, and technologically advanced armies designed to compete against similarly designed forces.

Clausewitz also forwarded the issue of casus belli. Wars had been fought for social, religious, or even cultural reasons, and Clausewitz taught that war is merely "a continuation of politics by other means." It is a rational calculation in which states fight for their interests (whether they are economic, security-related, or otherwise) once normal discourse has broken down.

=== Prevalence ===
Most modern wars have been conducted using conventional means. Confirmed use of biological warfare by a nation state has not occurred since 1945, and chemical warfare has been used only a few times (the latest known confrontation in which it was utilized being the Syrian Civil War). Nuclear warfare has only occurred once: the American bombing of the Japanese cities of Hiroshima and Nagasaki in August 1945.

=== Since World War II ===
The state and Clausewitzian principles peaked in the World Wars, during the 20th century, but they also laid the groundwork for their dilapidation from nuclear proliferation. During the Cold War, the superpowers sought to avoid open conflict between their respective forces, as both sides recognized that such a clash could very easily escalate and quickly involve nuclear weapons. Instead, the superpowers fought each other through their involvement in proxy wars, military buildups, and diplomatic standoffs. Thus, no two nuclear powers have yet fought a conventional war directly except for two brief skirmishes between China and Soviet Union in the 1969 Sino-Soviet conflict and between India and Pakistan in the 1999 Kargil War.

However, conventional wars have been fought since 1945 between countries without nuclear weapons, such as the Iran–Iraq War and Eritrean–Ethiopian War, or between a nuclear state and a non-nuclear state, like the Gulf War and Russo-Ukrainian War.

== See also ==
- Asymmetric warfare
- Guerrilla warfare
- Low-intensity operations
- Psychological warfare
- Unconventional warfare
