= Center of gravity (military) =

Military concept

Center of gravity (COG) is a military concept referring to the primary source of strength, balance, or stability necessary for a force to maintain combat operations. Centers of gravity can be physical, moral, or both, and exist for all belligerents at all tactical, strategic, and operational levels of war simultaneously. COGs play a central role in military planning, though exact definition has been elusive, with interpretations varying substantially over time, across forces, and between theorists. Generally, a COG can be thought of as an essential part of a combatant's warfighting system, interference with which would result in disproportionate impact on their combat effectiveness.

The concept was first developed by Carl von Clausewitz, a Prussian military theorist, in his work On War. After the end of the Vietnam War, interest in the idea was revitalized, resulting in several competing conceptualizations. Although the framework is used by armed forces around the world, there is widespread controversy regarding its definition and utility. Present academic literature on the subject generally agrees the term needs further clarification and careful application, while some theorists call for its complete removal from military doctrine.

== United States ==
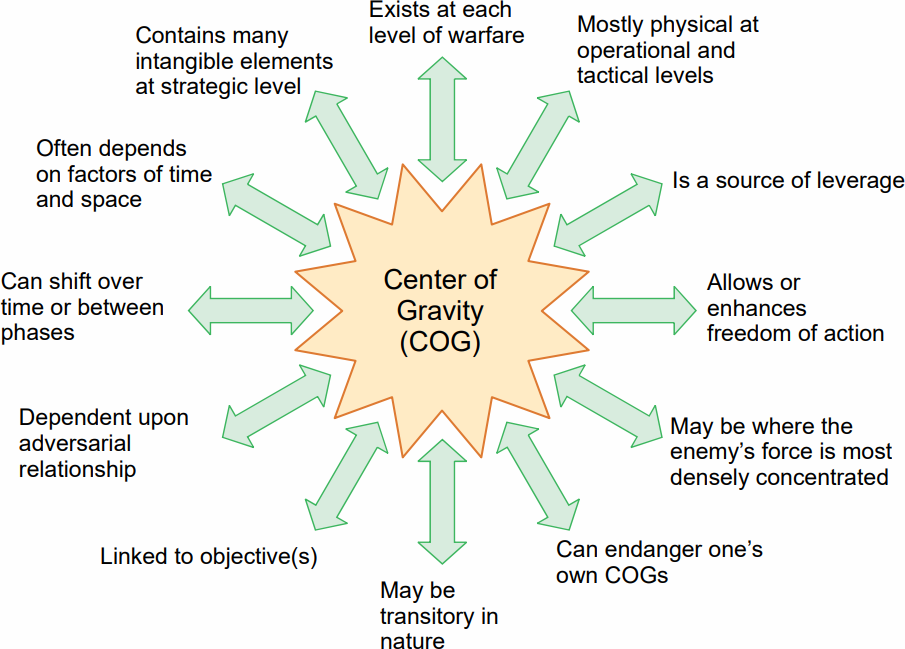
Characteristics of a Center of Gravity

The United States Department of Defense defines a COG as "the source of power that provides moral or physical strength, freedom of action, or will to act", although there has been a significant and widespread push to revert to a more classical, Clausewitzian interpretation of the phrase. There are twelve qualities of COGs the Joint Chiefs of Staff have doctrinally recognized:

1. Exists at each level of warfare
2. Mostly physical at operational and tactical levels
3. Is a source of leverage
4. Allows or enhances freedom of action
5. May be where the enemy's force is most densely concentrated
6. Can endanger one's own COGs
7. May be transitory in nature
8. Linked to objective(s)
9. Dependent upon adversarial relationship
10. Can shift over time or between phases
11. Often depends on factors of time and space
12. Contains many intangible elements at strategic level

Because the COG is one or multiple root enablers of a combatant's ability to interfere with the objectives of an opponent, friendly force composition plays just as significant a role in how this concept is interpreted as that of the opponent. As such, each of the various United States Armed Forces Service branches understand the concept through a unique lens specific to that branch's structure and operational priorities and capabilities. Due to the size and scale of the United States Army, it tends to recognize a COG as a combatant's strongest characteristic, capability, or locality. Conversely, due to the lower personnel count of the United States Marine Corps, they tend to view a COG as the weakness of a combatant. On the other hand, the United States Air Force takes a "targeting" approach to warfare, meaning they often treat COGs as a series of bombable strategic and operational-critical targets.

This means, in the case of an insurgency, the U.S. military may define their opponent's COG as the entire host population, a core group of leaders/believers, or an external nation's material, financial, or political support.

== Center of gravity analysis ==
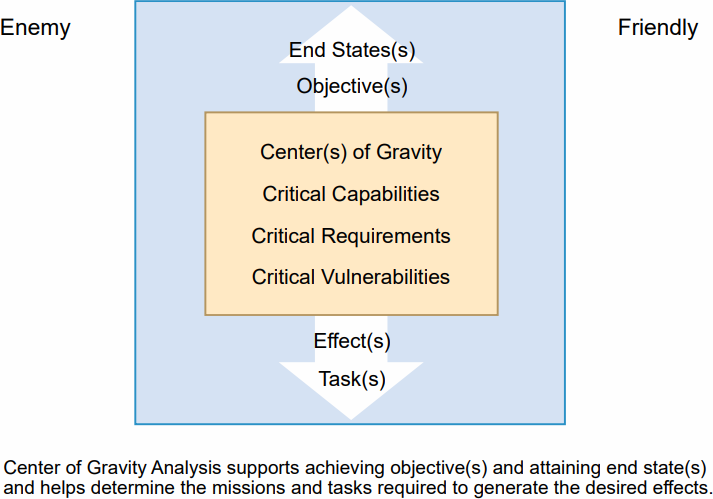
Center of Gravity Analysis

COG analysis helps to identify vulnerabilities and how an actor's will might be influenced to achieve objectives. Most modern systems of COG analysis rely on Joseph Strange's assessment framework of critical capabilities, critical requirements, and critical vulnerabilities. Critical capabilities are the primary abilities essential to the accomplishment of a combatant's mission. Critical requirements are essential conditions, resources, and means the COG requires to employ the critical capability. Critical vulnerabilities are aspects of critical requirements vulnerable to attack. The Joint Chiefs of Staff, the National Defense University and Joint Forces Quarterly discuss three approaches to assessment of these critical factors:

- Critical Factors Analysis (CFA)
- Eikmeier method
- Godzilla method

Both the Eikmeier and Godzilla methods provide testable criteria for measuring and assessing various factors in the analysis. Meanwhile, CFA uses a subjective system of "means, ways, and ends" to assess critical capabilities, critical requirements, and critical vulnerabilities. CFA is the only system officially recognized by Joint Chiefs of Staff in Joint Publications.

=== Critical Factors Analysis ===
When using CFA, planners evaluate the operational design elements and identify those considered crucial for mission accomplishment. This analysis identifies the characteristics of a threat that present challenges to friendly forces and provide capabilities to that threat. It is the only COG analysis system officially recognized in Joint Publications.

=== Eikmeier method ===
There are six steps involved in Eikmeier's method of COG analysis:

1. Identify the organization's desired ends or objectives.
2. Identify the possible “ways” or actions that can achieve the desired ends. Select the way(s) that the evidence suggests the organization is most likely to use. Remember: Ways are actions and should be expressed as verbs. Then select the most elemental or essential action—that selection is the critical capability. Ways = critical capabilities.
3. List the organization's means available or needed to execute the way/critical capability.
4. Select the entity (noun) from the list of means that inherently possesses the critical capability to achieve the end. This selection is the center of gravity. It is the doer of the action that achieves the ends.
5. From the remaining items on the means list, select those that are critical for execution of the critical capability. These are the critical requirements.
6. Complete the process by identifying those critical requirements vulnerable to adversary actions.

=== Godzilla method ===
In the Godzilla method, the critical strengths of the system are listed. Planners then evaluate the hypothetical impact of Godzilla "destroying" each item on the list. When a force is no longer able to achieve its operational objectives because of the neutralization or destruction of a single element within the system, that element is the center of gravity.

== See also ==
- Military strategy
- United States Army Strategist
