= Absolute war =

Philosophy of war concept

The concept of absolute war is a theoretical construct developed by the Prussian military theorist General Carl von Clausewitz in his 10-volume philosophical exploration of war, On War (German: Vom Kriege, 1832). It is discussed almost exclusively in the first half of Book VIII, with few references in his other volumes.

It means a war that is a pure act of physical force, unrestricted by factors external to purely physical force. It leads inevitably through escalation to extremes of will and effort. It disarms the enemy rendering him powerless to resist the victor's will. In the 19th century, Clausewitz saw it as a logical fantasy, not possible in reality. The main objective of this form of warfare is the complete annihilation of the opponent, accomplished through the rapid and intense application of force. Absolute war is seen as unreasonable and illogical, as it follows its own internal logic, escalates uncontrollably, and threatens the very existence of humanity. But since the arrival of nuclear bombs in the 20th century, there is some possibility of such war to become reality, although it can still be irrational due to the danger of mutually assured destruction.

The notion of an "absolute form of war" is derived from the new style of warfare introduced by the French Revolution and brought to a high level of performance by Napoleon Bonaparte. Although absolute war is presented as a philosophical concept, and thus not capable of perfect attainment in reality, it was nonetheless modeled closely by Napoleon on his most masterful campaigns and was intended to be pursued or emulated by commanders "when possible". Absolute war was characterized by Clausewitz as containing notably high levels of energy and professional competence while aiming its sights on the destruction of the opposing force and the attainment of a political decision by force of arms.

== Similar concepts used by Clausewitz ==
=== War of observation ===
Absolute war is a contrast to a weaker form Clausewitz called war of observation which is based on the carefully circumscribed use of force in the century prior to the French Revolution. This two-ended framework appears to have been experimental and Clausewitz became critical of it by the middle of Book VIII—thereafter the term absolute war dropped out and the weaker "war of observation" was transformed into a more legitimate form called the "limited aim". In Book I, drafted later, the term absolute war does not appear; for practical purposes, war in the real world is described using a spectrum. On one end of the spectrum lies the limited aim of wearing down the enemy's will to carry on the military struggle, on the other side lies the most ambitious form available in reality, the aim of rendering one's opponent militarily helpless.

=== Ideal war ===
Absolute war is often confused with a different concept of ideal war featured in the first chapter of On War. In that discussion, Clausewitz explains that ideal war is a philosophical abstraction—a "logical fantasy"—that is impossible in practice because it is not directed or constrained by political motives or concerns, nor limited by the practical constraints of time, space, and human nature. He called warfare constrained by these moderating real-world influences real war. Absolute war is also routinely confused with "total war", a term that does not appear on On War.

Ideal war can be seen as an act of violence without compromise by mirror-image states pursuing objectives of the very highest importance, in which they fight to war's "logical" extremes; it is a war unaffected by political and moral considerations or moderation.

== The three reciprocal actions ==
=== The utmost use of force ===
The first reciprocal action states that war in its most logical form would involve each state continually reciprocating each other's use of force plus additional force to maintain a superiority. Clausewitz states that "it follows that he who uses force unsparingly; without reference to bloodshed involved, must obtain a superiority if his adversary uses less vigour in [the] application [of force]". This action leads to both warring parties using violence to its utmost extent and leads to the first extreme of war.

=== The aim is to disarm the enemy ===
The second reciprocal action describes a situation where two or more hostile states try to impose their will on the other. Clausewitz states that the logical purpose of war is to make the opponent comply with one's will. However, an opponent often refuses to comply with their opponent's will until it becomes the least oppressive of available options to the oppressed party. Therefore, to make a state comply with their opponent's will, a state must place its adversary in a position that is deemed more oppressive to it than the oppressor's will to ensure compliance. Furthermore, the more oppressive position cannot be temporary, or appear to be temporary because the enemy is more likely to wait out the oppressive circumstance they are in when they can see the prospect of being in a better position at a later stage. Therefore, in order to best achieve this position a state must disarm its enemy by forcing it into a position from which it cannot resist.

=== An utmost exertion of powers ===
When introducing the third reciprocal action Clausewitz states that if a state wishes to defeat its enemies, it must annihilate them. According to Clausewitz, the use of power involves two factors. The first is the strength of available means, which is mostly measured by numerical values. The second factor is the strength of the will which cannot be specifically measured, only estimated, and is intangible. Once a state has learned the enemy's strength of resistance it can review its own means and adjust them upwards accordingly in an effort to gain the advantage. However, concurrently the enemy will also be taking these reciprocal actions, creating a third push towards an extreme.

== Confusion with total war ==
The recognition of total war since the start of World War I has created a degree of confusion for many scholars as the terms 'total war' and 'absolute war' are often used interchangeably. Total war is a war in which the home front (that is, a state's political system, society and economy) is heavily mobilized for the continuation and expansion of the war effort. It implies the subordination of politics (internal and external) to the goal of purely military victory. Total war is characterized by civilian infrastructure and civilians themselves becoming highly involved in war as part of the military's logistical support system.

Alternatively, ideal war is a theoretical ideal in which war reaches its logical extremes which free it from the moderating effects that are imposed on it by politics and society and by the practical constraints of time and space. Clausewitz held that ideal war was impossible because political and military leaders cannot avoid these influences.

Conflicting information concerning absolute war is the result of Clausewitz's personal intellectual evolution: the book was unfinished at the time of his untimely death and there are substantial contradictions between some of his earlier thinking and the most advanced elements, the latter being represented by the last half of Book VIII, Book I (the only part of Clausewitz's unfinished draft that he considered to be in finished form), and the "Note of 1827". Thus "absolute war" reflects an earlier conception advocating the more extreme reaches of the forms that Napoleonic warfare had been achieved. That conception, however, was rejected by Clausewitz. Many analysts have assumed that the description of ideal war in Book I must refer to the same concept, however, the two concepts are conceptually oppositional. Clausewitz did not publish a resolution as to whether absolute war is supposed to reflect an achievable form or is instead an unattainable ideal to aim at. Ideal war resolved that confusion though its practically unachievable nature in most of its aspects and reflecting an unrealistic idea of war that should not be pursued in real life.

== See also ==
- Perpetual war
