= Military theory =

Study of the theories of war and warfare

Military theory is the study of the theories which define, inform, guide and explain war and warfare. Military theory analyses both normative behavioral phenomena and explanatory causal aspects to better understand war and how it is fought. It examines war and trends in warfare beyond simply describing events in military history. While military theories may employ the scientific method, theory differs from military science. Theory aims to explain the causes for military victory and produce guidance on how war should be waged and won, rather than developing universal, immutable laws which can bound the physical act of warfare or codifying empirical data, such as weapon effects, platform operating ranges, consumption rates and target information, to aid military planning.

Military theory is multi-disciplinary drawing on social science and humanities academic fields through the disciplines of political science, strategic studies, military studies and history. It examines the nature of war, and the conclusions of wars.

Military philosophy likewise studies questions such as the reasons to go to war, jus ad bellum, and just ways to fight wars, jus in bello. Two of the earliest military philosophers date from antiquity; Thucydides and Sun Tzu. While military theory can inform military doctrine or help explain military history, it differs from them as it contemplates abstract concepts, themes, principles and ideas to formulate solutions to actual and potential problems concerning war and warfare.

== Use of military theory ==
Prussian military theorist Carl von Clausewitz wrote,

'The primary purpose of any theory is to clarify concepts and ideas that have become, as it were, confused and entangled. Not until terms and concepts have been defined can one hope to make any progress in examining the questions clearly and simply and expect the reader to share one's views.'

Military theory informs the political, strategic, operational and tactical levels of war. It does so by contributing to knowledge on the subjects of war and warfare. This aids in understanding why and when force is used and what forms the use of force may take. It also aids in identifying and explaining practical outcomes to help determine how force may be applied. Military theories can be divided into several categories, such as operational theory and tactical theory. They may also be categorised by environment or domain, such as space power or astronautics.

== See also ==
- Military doctrine
- Military science
- List of military writers
