= War studies =

Multidisciplinary study of war

War studies, sometimes called polemology (derived from Ancient Greek: πόλεμος, romanized: pólemos, lit. 'war, battle' + -logy), is the multi-disciplinary study of war. It pertains to the military, diplomatic, philosophical, social, political, psychological or economic dimensions of human conflict.

== History ==
In 1943, King's College London reestablished its military science department as the Department of War Studies. The department was discontinued in 1948, and the field of war studies was taught in the Department of Medieval and Modern History until the Department of War Studies was reinstated in 1962.

== Disciplines ==
- Laws of war – International regulations of warfare
- Philosophy of war – Theory of causes and ethics of armed conflict
  - Ethics of war – Doctrine about when a war is ethically just
    - Just war theory – Doctrine about when a war is ethically just
  - Deterrence theory – Military strategy during the Cold War with regard to the use of nuclear weapons
- Psychology of war – Specialized field in psychological science
  - Post traumatic stress disorder – Mental disorder associated with trauma
  - Psychological operations – Information operations to assist military objectives
- Military history – Study of war and its impact on societies, cultures, and economies
- Military science – Theory, method, and practice of producing military capability
- Motivations, conduct and effect of war
- Economics of war – Actions taken by a state to mobilize its economy for war production
- Sociology of war
- Sociology of the military – Subfield within sociology which studies the military as a social group
- International relations – Study of relationships between states
  - International relations theory – Study of international relations from a theoretical perspective
- Political science – Scientific study of politics and social science
- Anthropology – Scientific study of humans, human behavior, and societies

== See also ==
- Peace and conflict studies – Field in social science
- Security studies – Discipline of international relations
- Strategic studies – Interdisciplinary academic field
- Wargame – Strategy game that realistically simulates war
- International humanitarian law – Law of war to protect non-combatants
