= Christopher Bassford =

American military historian (born 1953)

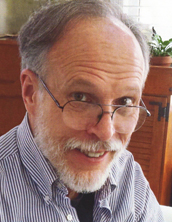
- Occupations: Military historian Professor of Strategy
- Writing career
- Language: English

Christopher Bassford (born 1953) is an American military historian, best known for his works on the Prussian military philosopher Carl von Clausewitz.

== Life ==
He was Professor of Strategy at the National War College in Washington, D.C., from 1999 until 2012, when he joined the faculty of the College of International Security Affairs as part of the JSOMA program] supporting U.S. Army Special Operations Command. He is the web editor of The Clausewitz Homepage, a large educational website that has been on-line since 1995.

== Works ==
Bassford has written scholarly studies, military doctrine, and articles for the popular press. He is the author of several books, including Clausewitz in English: The Reception of Clausewitz in Britain and America, 1815-1945 and The Spit-Shine Syndrome: Organizational Irrationality in the American Field Army. He is one of the editors of the Boston Consulting Group's business-oriented Clausewitz On Strategy: Inspiration and Insight from a Master Strategist and Carl von Clausewitz and Arthur Wellesley, 1st Duke of Wellington, On Waterloo: Clausewitz, Wellington, and the Campaign of 1815, ed./trans. Christopher Bassford, Daniel Moran, and Gregory W. Pedlow (Clausewitz.com, 2010). From 1995 to 1999 he was involved in the writing of USMC doctrine, authoring MCDP 1-1, Strategy; MCDP 1-2, Campaigning; "MCWP 5-1, Marine Corps Planning" (Draft); MCWP 2-15.3, Ground Reconnaissance Operations; and MCWP 3-2, Aviation Operations, as well as participating in the writing of several other USMC and Joint concepts and doctrinal publications.

His academic articles include:

- "Clausewitz’s Categories of War and the Supersession of ‘Absolute War’," (working paper) ClausewitzStudies.org, v.5 FEB 2022.
- "John Keegan and the Grand Tradition of Trashing Clausewitz," War in History, November 1994.
- "Reclaiming the Clausewitzian Trinity," Parameters, Autumn 1995 (with Edward Villacres).
- "Clausewitz and His Works".
- "Doctrinal Complexity: Nonlinearity in Marine Corps Doctrine," in F.G. Hoffman and Gary Horne, eds., Maneuver Warfare Science, United States Marine Corps Combat Development Command, 1998.
- "Bringing Real Life to American Strategy in Afghanistan," Small Wars Journal, 3 March 2012.
- "Tiptoe Through the Trinity: The Strange Persistence of Trinitarian Warfare," working paper, 2005–2015.

His on-line books include:

- Clausewitz in English: The Reception of Clausewitz in Great Britain and America (New York & London: Oxford University Press, 1994), ISBN 978-0195083835. © C. Bassford. Full text on-line in HTML.
- "Policy, Politics, War, and Military Strategy," working text, 1997–2015. This is derived from Bassford's original Draft of MCDP 1-1: Strategy (1997), the US Marine Corps' Strategy manual. Full text on-line in HTML.
- Carl von Clausewitz and Arthur Wellesley, First Duke of Wellington, On Waterloo: Clausewitz, Wellington, and the Campaign of 1815, ed./trans. Christopher Bassford, Daniel Moran, and Gregory W. Pedlow (Clausewitz.com, 2010/2015). ISBN 978-1453701508. Full text on-line in HTML.

== The Clausewitz Homepage ==
Bassford is the editor of The Clausewitz Homepage, an educational website that focuses on the German military philosopher Carl von Clausewitz, and also of ClausewitzStudies.org, which supports the scholarly study of Clausewitz's life and work. Bassford's own work on Clausewitz concentrates on the evolution of Clausewitz's reception, reputation, and impact in the English-speaking world. He is interested in the relationship between Clausewitzian theory, concepts from the field of nonlinear science, and modern evolutionary theory.
