= Karl Wilhelm Wach =

German painter (1787–1845)

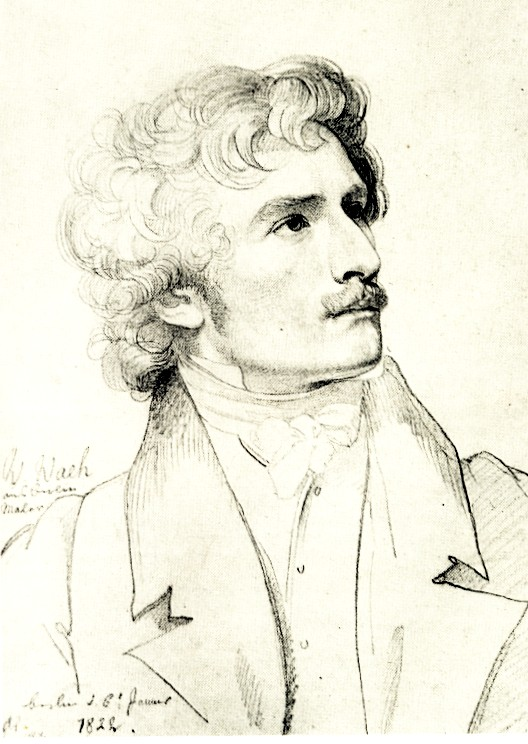
- Drawing by Carl Christian Vogel von Vogelstein
- Born: 11 September 1787; Berlin, Kingdom of Prussia, Holy Roman Empire
- Died: 24 November 1845 (aged 58)
- Occupation: Painter

Karl (or Carl) Wilhelm Wach (11 September 1787 – 24 November 1845) was a German painter.

== Life ==
Wach was born in Berlin in 1787, studied art at the Prussian Academy of Arts and was a pupil of painter Karl Kretschmar. At the age of just 20, Wach was commissioned to paint an altar piece for the Paretz village church and produced his Christ with Four Apostles (1807).

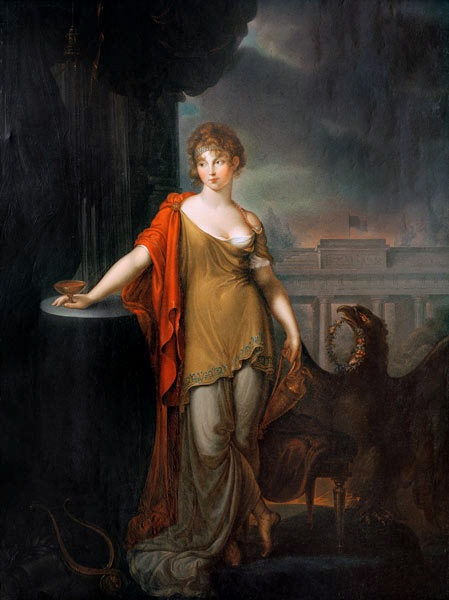
Königin Luise (1812)

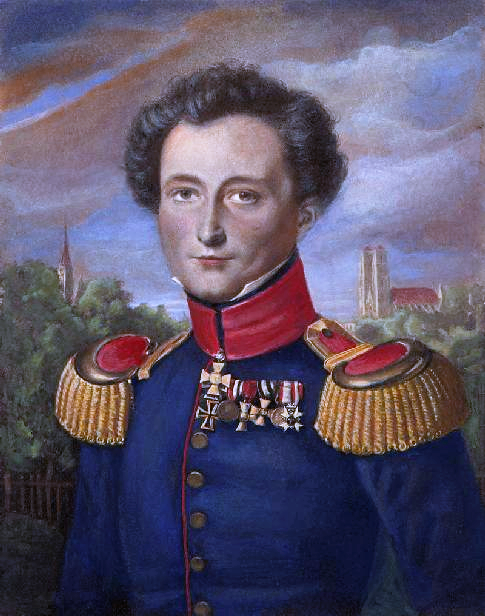
Carl von Clausewitz

Five years later came his artistic breakthrough, his painting of Königin Luise (1812). After spending 1813 to 1815 in the Prussian army, Wach then established himself in Paris. He met William Hensel and the two became pupils of the painters Antoine Jean Gros and Jacques-Louis David. In 1817 Wach undertook a longer study trip to Italy, above all to study artists from Quattrocento. His strongest influence – according to his own statements – was however Raphael. Two years later Wach returned to Berlin (1819) and set himself up himself as a freelance artist. His first large commission was a picture for Berlin Concert Hall. Wach created for it a cover painting of the nine Muses. Prussian king Frederick William III made available to Wach premises in which he then furnished a studio. Due to its influence and its many pupils, this studio soon became a school. By 1837 it had nearly 70 pupils, almost all of whom went on to forge artistic careers. His activity as a teacher did not noticeably impair his artistic work. Wach was honoured with the title professor and appointed a member of Prussian Academy of Arts (1820). To mark his 40th birthday Wach was officially promoted to royal painter (1827).

Wach died in 1845.

== Selected works ==
- Christ with four Apostles (1807)
- Königin Luise (1812)
- The Communion and the Auferstehung Christ (in the Evangelist church of St Peter & Paul, Moscow)
- The beautiful Velletrinerin, (1820)
- Madonna picture (1826, for Prince Frederik of the Netherlands)
- The Three Himmlischen Virtues (1830, in Friedrichswerder Church in Berlin)
- Carl von Clausewitz (1830)
- Christ at the oil mountain
- Psyche of Amor surprise
- A life-large Nymphe
- Bildnis Bettina von Savigny (1834)
- Johannes in the desert (1838)
- Judith with the head of the Holofernes (1838)
- Königin Elisabeth von Preußen (1840)

• Italienerin in albanischer Nationaltracht (Rom 1818, alte Kopie nach einem fehlenden Gemälde)
