= Lynn Montross =

American historian

Lynn Montross was born in Battle Creek, Nebraska in 1895, and lived in Denver, Colorado, before moving to Washington, D.C. He studied at the University of Nebraska before serving three years in an American Expeditionary Force (AEF) regiment in World War I, and afterward became a free-lance writer for the Chicago Daily News. He died in 1961, about a year after the publication of the third edition of his book War Through the Ages.

From 1950 to 1961 he was a historical writer for the United States Marine Corps.
