= Robert Matteson Johnston =

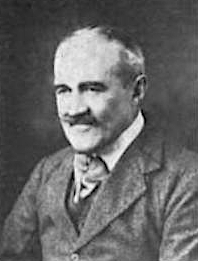
- Born: April 11, 1867; Paris, France
- Died: January 28, 1920 (aged 52); Cambridge, Massachusetts, United States
- Education: Eton College; Pembroke College, Cambridge
- Occupation: Historian

Robert Matteson Johnston (1867–1920) was an American historian and a scholar of military history.

== Biography ==
Robert Matteson Johnston was born in Paris on April 11, 1867. He was educated at Eton College and Pembroke College, Cambridge. He taught at Harvard University and Mount Holyoke College, and was a founding member of the faculty at Simmons University. In 1917, he was appointed Chief of the Historical Section of the General Staff in the field with the rank of major in the United States Army.

He died in Cambridge, Massachusetts on January 28, 1920.

== Scholarship ==
- The Roman Theocracy and the Republic, 1846–49 (1901)
- Napoleon: A Short Biography (1904)
- The Napoleonic Empire in Southern Italy and the Rise of the Secret Societies, 2 vols. (London: Macmillan, 1904). Vol. 1 Vol. 2
- The Memoirs of Malakoff (1907)
- American Soldiers (1907)
- The French Revolution (1909)
- The Corsican (1910)
- The Holy Christian Church (1912)
- Mémoire de Marie Caroline, reine de Naples (1912)
- Bull Run (1913)
- First Reflections on the Campaign of 1918 (1920) OCLC 1022272
