= On War =

1832 treatise by von Clausewitz

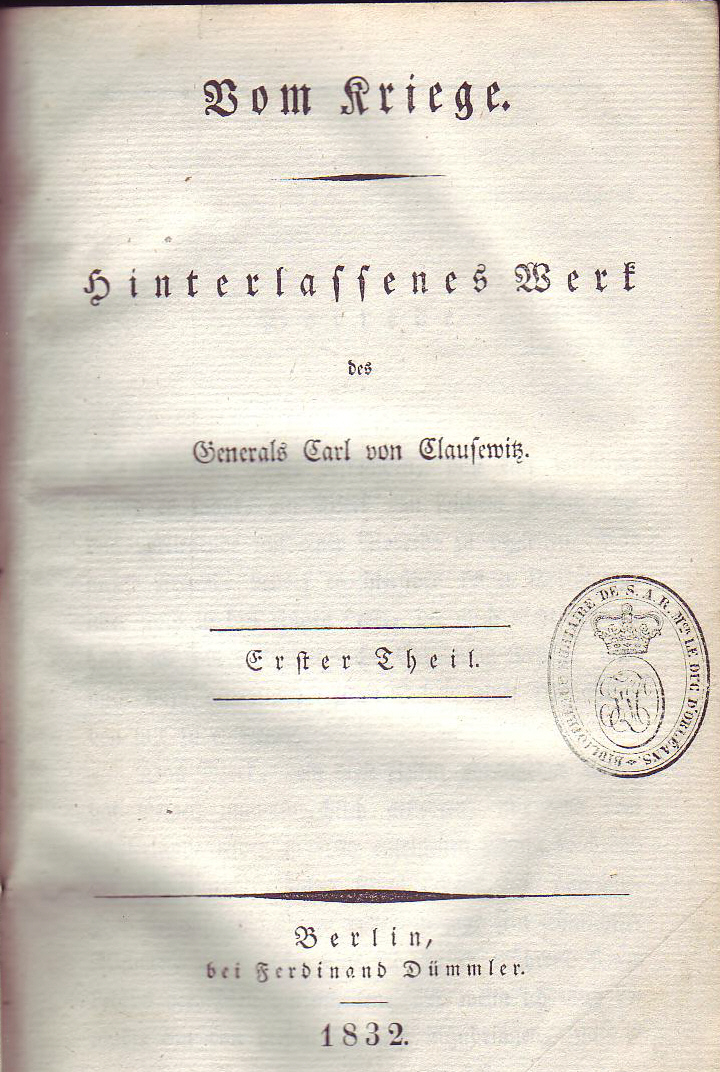
Title page of the original German edition Vom Kriege, published in 1832

Vom Kriege (German pronunciation: [fɔm ˈkʁiːɡə]) is a book on war and military strategy by Prussian general Carl von Clausewitz (1780–1831), written mostly after the Napoleonic Wars, between 1816 and 1830, and published posthumously by his wife Marie von Brühl in 1832. It remains both controversial and influential on military strategic thinking.

Vom Kriege has been translated into English several times as On War. On War is an unfinished work. Clausewitz had set about revising his accumulated manuscripts in 1827, but did not live to finish the task. His wife edited his collected works and published them between 1832 and 1835.

== History ==
Clausewitz was among those intrigued by the manner in which the leaders of the French Revolution, especially Napoleon, changed the conduct of war through their ability to motivate the populace and gain access to the full resources of the state, thus unleashing war on a greater scale than had previously been seen in Europe. Clausewitz believed that moral forces in battle had a significant influence on its outcome. Clausewitz was well-educated and had strong interests in art, history, science, and education. He was a professional soldier who spent a considerable part of his life fighting against Napoleon. In his lifetime, he had experienced both the French Revolutionary Army's (1792—1802) zeal and the conscripted armies employed by the French crown. The insights he gained from his political and military experiences, combined with a solid grasp of European history, provided the basis for his work.

A wealth of historical examples is used to illustrate its various ideas. Napoleon and Frederick the Great figure prominently for having made very efficient use of the terrain, movement and the forces at their disposal.

Regarding Clausewitz's intellectual-cultural background, Azar Gat argues that he expressed in the field of military theory the main themes of the Romantic reaction against the worldview of the Enlightenment, rejecting universal principles and stressing historical diversity and the forces of the human spirit. This explains the strength and value of many of his arguments, derived from this great cultural movement, but also his often harsh rhetoric against his predecessors.

== Clausewitz's theory ==
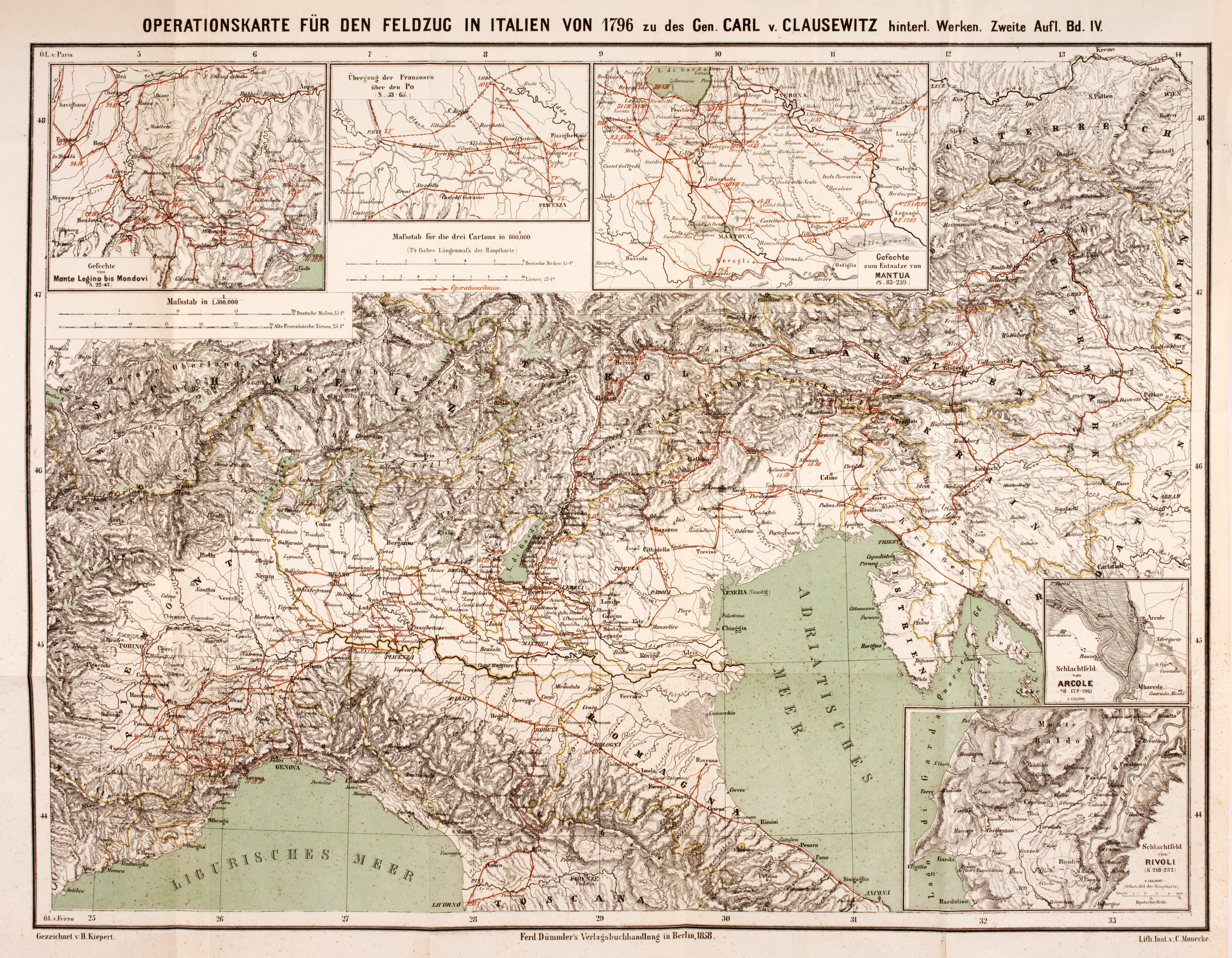
An operational map for Napoleon's military expedition to Italy, 1796. Map from Clausewitz: Vom Kriege, 1857.

=== Definition of war ===
Clausewitz argued that war theory cannot be a strict operational advice for generals. Instead, he wanted to highlight general principles that would result from the study of history and logical thinking. He contended that military campaigns could be planned only to a very small degree because incalculable influences or events, so-called friction, would quickly make any too-detailed planning in advance obsolete. Military leaders must be capable to make decisions under time pressure with incomplete information since in his opinion "three quarters of the things on which action is built in war" are concealed and distorted by the fog of war.

In his 1812 Bekenntnisschrift ("Notes of Confession"), he presents a more existential interpretation of war by envisioning war as the highest form of self-assertion by a people. That corresponded in every respect with the spirit of the time when the French Revolution and the conflicts that arose from it had caused the evolution of conscript armies and guerrillas. The people's armies supported the idea that war is an existential struggle.

During the following years, however, Clausewitz gradually abandoned this exalted view and concluded that the war served as a mere instrument: "Thus, war is an act of violence in order to force our will upon the enemy."

=== Purpose, goal and means ===
Clausewitz analyzed the conflicts of his time along the line of the categories Purpose, Goal and Means. He reasoned that the Purpose of war is one's will to be enforced, which is determined by politics. The Goal of the conflict is therefore to defeat the opponent in order to exact the Purpose. The Goal is pursued with the help of a strategy, that might be brought about by various Means such as by the defeat or the elimination of opposing armed forces or by non-military Means (such as propaganda, economic sanctions and political isolation). Thus, any resource of the human body and mind and all the moral and physical powers of a state might serve as Means to achieve the set goal.

One of Clausewitz's best-known quotes summarizes that idea: "War is the continuation of policy with other means."

That quote in itself allows for the interpretation that the military will take over from politics as soon as war has begun (as, for example, the German General Staff did during World War I). However, Clausewitz had postulated the primacy of politics and in this context elaborated: "[...], we claim that war is nothing more than a continuation of the political process by applying other means. By applying other means we simultaneously assert that the political process does not end with the conclusion of the war or is being transformed into something entirely different, but that it continues to exist and proceed in its essence, regardless of the structure of the means it makes use of [...]."

According to Azar Gat, the "general message" of the book was that "the conduct of war could not be reduced to universal principles [and is] dominated by political decisions and moral forces." These basic conclusions are essential to Clausewitz's theory:

- War must never be seen as having any purpose in itself but should be seen as a political instrument: "War is not merely a political act, but a real political instrument, a continuation of the political process, an application by other means."
- The military objectives in war that support one's political objectives fall into two broad types: "war to achieve limited aims" and war to "disarm" the enemy: "to render [him] politically helpless or militarily impotent."
- All else being equal, the course of war will tend to favor the party with the stronger emotional and political motivations, especially the defender.

Some of the key ideas (not necessarily original to Clausewitz or even to his mentor, Gerhard von Scharnhorst) discussed in On War include (in no particular order of importance):

- the dialectical approach to military analysis
- the methods of "critical analysis"
- the uses and abuses of historical studies
- the nature of the balance-of-power mechanism
- the relationship between political objectives and military objectives in war
- the asymmetrical relationship between attack and defense
- the nature of "military genius" (German: der kriegerische Genius) - as exemplified particularly in Frederick the Great and in Napoleon Bonaparte
- the "fascinating trinity" (Wunderliche Dreifaltigkeit) of war
- philosophical distinctions between "absolute or ideal war," and "real war"
- in "real war," the distinctive poles of a) limited war and b) war to "render the enemy helpless"
- "war" belongs fundamentally to the social realm, rather than to the realms of art or science
- "strategy" belongs primarily to the realm of art
- "tactics" belongs primarily to the realm of science
- the essential unpredictability of war
- simplicity: Everything is very simple in war, but the simplest thing is difficult. These difficulties accumulate. The strength of any strategy lies in its simplicity.
- the "fog of war"
- "friction"
- strategic and operational "centres of gravity"
- the "culminating point of the offensive"
- the "culminating point of victory"

== Criticism ==
Clausewitz and his proponents have been severely criticized by other military theorists, like Antoine-Henri Jomini in the 19th century, B. H. Liddell Hart in the mid-20th century, and Martin van Creveld and John Keegan more recently. On War is a work rooted solely in the world of the nation state, states historian Martin van Creveld, who alleges that Clausewitz takes the state "almost for granted", as he rarely looks at anything before the 1648 Peace of Westphalia, and mediaeval warfare is effectively ignored in Clausewitz's theory. He alleges that Clausewitz does not address any form of intra/supra-state conflict, such as rebellion and revolution, because he could not theoretically account for warfare before the existence of the state.

Previous kinds of conflict were demoted to criminal activities without legitimacy and not worthy of the label "war". Van Creveld argues that "Clausewitzian war" requires the state to act in conjunction with the people and the army, the state becoming a massive engine built to exert military force against an identical opponent. He supports that statement by pointing to the conventional armies in existence throughout the 20th century. However, revolutionaries like Karl Marx and Friedrich Engels derived some inspiration from Clausewitzian ideas.

Referring to much of the current interpretation of On War as the Emperor's New Clothes syndrome, Gat argues that instead of critically addressing the puzzling contradictions in On War, Clausewitz has been set in stone and could not be wrong.

== English translations ==
- 1873. Graham, J. J., translator. Republished 1908 with extensive commentary and notes by F. N. Maude.
- 1943. O. J. Matthijs Jolles, translator (New York: Random House, 1943).
- 1968. Edited with introduction by Anatol Rapoport. Viking Penguin. ISBN 0-14-044427-0.
- 1976/1984. Michael Howard and Peter Paret, editors and translators. Princeton University Press. ISBN 0-691-05657-9.
- 1989. Michael Howard and Peter Paret, editors and translators. Princeton University Press. ISBN 978-0-691-01854-6.

== See also ==
=== Concepts ===
- List of military theorists
- Philosophy of war
- Realpolitik

=== Books ===
- Achtung - Panzer! by Heinz Guderian
- Anabasis and Hellenica by Xenophon
- The Art of War by Niccolò Machiavelli
- Commentarii de Bello Gallico by Gaius Julius Caesar
- Epitoma rei militaris by Publius Flavius Vegetius Renatus
- Infanterie Greift An by Erwin Rommel
- Mes Rêveries by Maurice de Saxel
- Storm of Steel by Ernst Jünger
- Strategikon of Maurice by Byzantine Emperor Maurice
- Tactica of Emperor Leo VI the Wise
- Truppenführung by Helmuth von Moltke the Elder
- The Utility of Force by General Sir Rupert Smith
- The Influence of Sea Power upon History by Admiral Alfred Thayer Mahan

== Notes ==
a. : For example, writing in his introduction to Sun Tzu's Art of War, B. H. Liddell Hart stated that "Civilization might have been spared much of the damage suffered in the world wars of this century if the influence of Clausewitz's monumental tome On War, which molded European military thought in the era preceding the First World War, had been blended with and balanced by a knowledge of Sun Tzu's exposition on The Art of War." This comment is tempered by the comment that the "ill effects of Clausewitz's teaching arose largely from his disciples' too shallow and too extreme interpretation of it", but it remains an influential criticism. Extracted from The Art of War (UNESCO Collection of Representative Works), Samuel B. Griffith https://web.archive.org/web/20060628174003/http://www.kw.igs.net/~tacit/artofwar/suntzu.htm.

== Bibliography ==
- Bassford, Christopher (1994). Clausewitz in English: The Reception of Clausewitz in Britain and America. Oxford University Press.
- Brodie, Bernard (1976). A guide to the reading of "On War.". Princeton University Press.
- Clausewitz, Carl von (2018). Murray, Nicholas; Pringle, Christopher (eds.). Napoleon's 1796 Italian Campaign. Lawrence, Kansas: University Press of Kansas. ISBN 978-0-7006-2676-2.
- Clausewitz, Carl von (2020). Murray, Nicholas; Pringle, Christopher (eds.). Napoleon Absent, Coalition Ascendant: The 1799 Campaign in Italy and Switzerland, Volume 1. Lawrence, Kansas: University Press of Kansas. ISBN 978-0-7006-3025-7.
- Clausewitz, Carl von (2021). Murray, Nicholas; Pringle, Christopher (eds.). The Coalition Crumbles, Napoleon Returns: The 1799 Campaign in Italy and Switzerland, Volume 2. Lawrence, Kansas: University Press of Kansas. ISBN 978-0-7006-3034-9.
- Gat, Azar (2001). A history of military thought: from the Enlightenment to the Cold War. Oxford (GB): Oxford University Press. ISBN 978-0-19-924762-2.
- Gat, Azar (2024). The Clausewitz myth: or the emperor's new clothes. Washington: John Hunt Publishing. ISBN 978-1-80341-621-2.
