= Dresden City Art Gallery =

Museum in Germany

Coordinates: 51°03′00″N 13°44′35″E

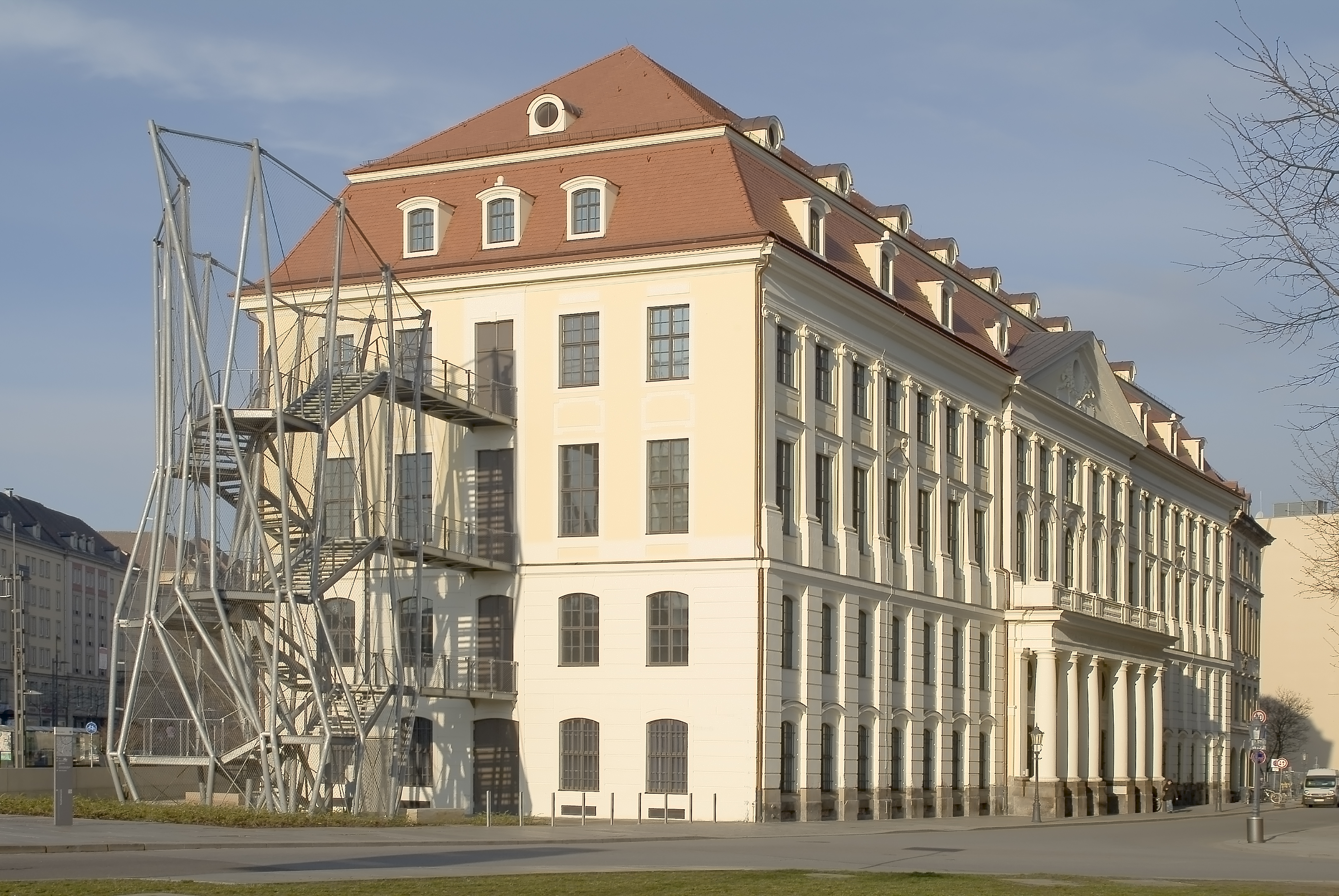
Dresden City Art Gallery.

The Dresden City Art Gallery (German: Städtische Galerie Dresden – Kunstsammlung) is the municipal art collection of Dresden, Germany, housed in the city's Landhaus. It was formed by the 19th and 20th century artworks of the Stadtmuseum Dresden, split off from the Museum and given a separate display in 2000. In 2002, Gisbert Porstmann became the founding director of the Dresden City Art Gallery, which officially opened in 2005.

== Location ==
The Dresden City Art Collection, which is located on the first floor of Dresden's city hall, was erected in 1770–1775 to the designs by the court architect Friedrich August Krubsacius and originally served as the conference building for the Saxon estates. Other nearby museums are the Dresden Fortress Museum and the Albertinum Museum, the latter hosting the New Masters Gallery of the Dresden State Art Collections.

The Collection of the Dresden City Art Gallery was established with the founding of the Society for the History and Topography of Dresden and its Surroundings in 1869. Its members had gathered evidence of bourgeois urban culture and purchased the first paintings. The emphasis was placed on portraits of significant personalities of Dresden's society, scenic views of the city and landscape paintings that depict the city's surroundings. For many years the fast-growing municipal collections were dispersed in various buildings until they were moved to the rooms around the atrium of the newly constructed city hall on 1 October 1910, where they remained before being relocated again during World War II.

Paul Ferdinand Schmidt, director of the municipal collections from 1919 to 1924, started to redesign the art collection completely. Schmidt's purchases were based on specific art-historical categories and included major works by Erich Heckel, Ernst Ludwig Kirchner, Otto Dix, Oskar Kokoschka, Kurt Schwitters and Lasar Segall. Schmidt succeeded in building up a world-class collection of German Expressionist art.

During the Degenerate Art period, art was seized by the Nazis, including 498 works of the municipal art collection. Most of the art remains missing and only a few works have been recovered by large national and international museums up to the present. During the war and in the immediate postwar period further works of art have been lost or destroyed. A detailed inventory of the losses is still being produced.

After the Second World War, the city's art inventory was moved to the Institute and Museum of the History of Dresden, renamed Dresden City Museum in 1990, which primarily focuses on the exploration of the city's history.

In 2000, the Dresden city council approved the establishment of a municipal art museum, which was built with the financial support of a sponsor, friends of the Dresden City Art Gallery, who celebrated the founding of the Dresden Municipal Gallery and Art Collection on 1 June 2002. The art stock of the Dresden City Museum was later acquired by the Dresden City Art Gallery. Their showrooms on the first floor opened on 2 July 2005. The permanent exhibition is situated in the west wing and displays works by painters and sculptors from the 19th to the 21st century. The east wing holds temporary exhibitions.

On 10 December 2007, the Dresden City Art Gallery announced a significant increase in their collection. With the acquisition of an extensive collection of works by A. R. Penck (Ralf Winkler), owned by Jürgen Schweinebraden, and a generous gift from the latter the Dresden City Art Gallery received approximately 40 paintings, objects and assemblages, 330 watercolors and drawings, 340 overwriting, 80 graphic works and more than 100 works from friends of the artist group "Lücke", which A.R. Penck was strongly associated with.

== Dresden Edition ==
In celebration of the opening of the Dresden City Art Gallery, ten artists made a first graphic edition available: Franz Ackermann, Katalin Deér, Eberhard Havekost, Sabine Hornig, Kerstin Kartscher, Olaf Nicolai, Frank Nitsche, Manfred Pernice, Thomas Scheibitz, and Silke Wagner. The Dresden Edition was limited to 50 copies, of which 33 numbered copies were put up for sale. For storage purposes, a special wooden box was developed in cooperation with the German workshops of Hellerau.

== DREWAG Prize for Contemporary Art ==
At the opening of the Dresden City Art Gallery the municipal services DREWAG (Stadtwerke Dresden GmbH DREWAG) donated the inaugural prize for contemporary art, which was awarded twice and discontinued in 2010. The DREWAG Prize for Contemporary Art promoted artists, who had their life and work center in the city of Dresden or the surrounding area. The prize includes a cash award, a solo exhibition at the Dresden City Art Gallery and the production of an exhibition catalog. The first DREWAG Prize for Contemporary Art 2006 went to the Dresden sculptor Sebastian Hempel. The winner of the second DREWAG Prize for Contemporary Art 2008 was Britta Jonas.

== Bibliography ==
- Gisbert Porstmann: Eine Neugründung auf dem Weg – die „Städtische Galerie Dresden“, in: Dresdner Geschichtsbuch, ed. by Stadtmusum Dresden, Altenburg, 2003, vol. 9, pp. 241–254.
- Gisbert Porstmann (ed.): Städtische Galerie Dresden – Führer durch die Sammlung der Gemälde, München/Berlin/London 2005, ISBN 3-7913-3394-1.
- Johannes Schmidt: Künstler, Kunst und Kunsterwerb. Die städtische Kunstsammlung in den Jahren 1924 bis 1933, in: Dresdner Geschichtsbuch, ed. by Stadtmuseum Dresden, Altenburg, 2007, vol. 12, pp. 181–202.
- Johannes Schmidt: „Deutsche“ statt moderner Kunst. Kunst in Dresden und die städtische Kunstsammlung in den Jahren 1933 bis 1935, in: Dresdner Geschichtsbuch, ed. by Stadtmuseum Dresden, Altenburg, 2008, vol. 13, pp. 191–218.
- Bertram Kaschek: Das muss man gesehen haben!, in: Die Zeit. Museumsführer. Die schönsten Kunstsammlungen in Deutschland, ed. by Hanno Rauterberg, Hamburg, 2010, pp. 86–89.
- Johannes Schmidt: Zwischen Künstlerförderung, Auftragskunst und Stadtdokumentation. Die städtische Kunstsammlung nach 1945, in: Dresdner Geschichtsbuch, ed. by Stadtmuseum Dresden, Altenburg, 2011, vol. 16, pp. 208–232.
