= Ernst Philipp Rosenkranz =

German piano maker

Ernst Philipp Rosenkranz (* July 10, 1773; † January 23, 1828) was a German piano maker.

He completed his apprenticeship as a piano builder with Heinrich Rudolf Mack in Dresden. In 1797 he opened his own workshop there. In 1826 he had the architect Gottlob Friedrich Thormeyer build him a palace in the Neustadt area of the city. Following his death in 1828, his son Friedrich Wilhelm Rosenkranz assumed leadership of the family business. Through exports to North American and other locations, the business established a worldwide reputation.

Surviving Rosenkranz instruments can now be found in the musical instrument collection of the Germanisches Nationalmuseum in Nuremberg and in the Salon Christophori in Berlin.
