= Sächsisches Ständehaus =

Building in Saxony, Germany

Coordinates: 51.0531°N 13.7392°E

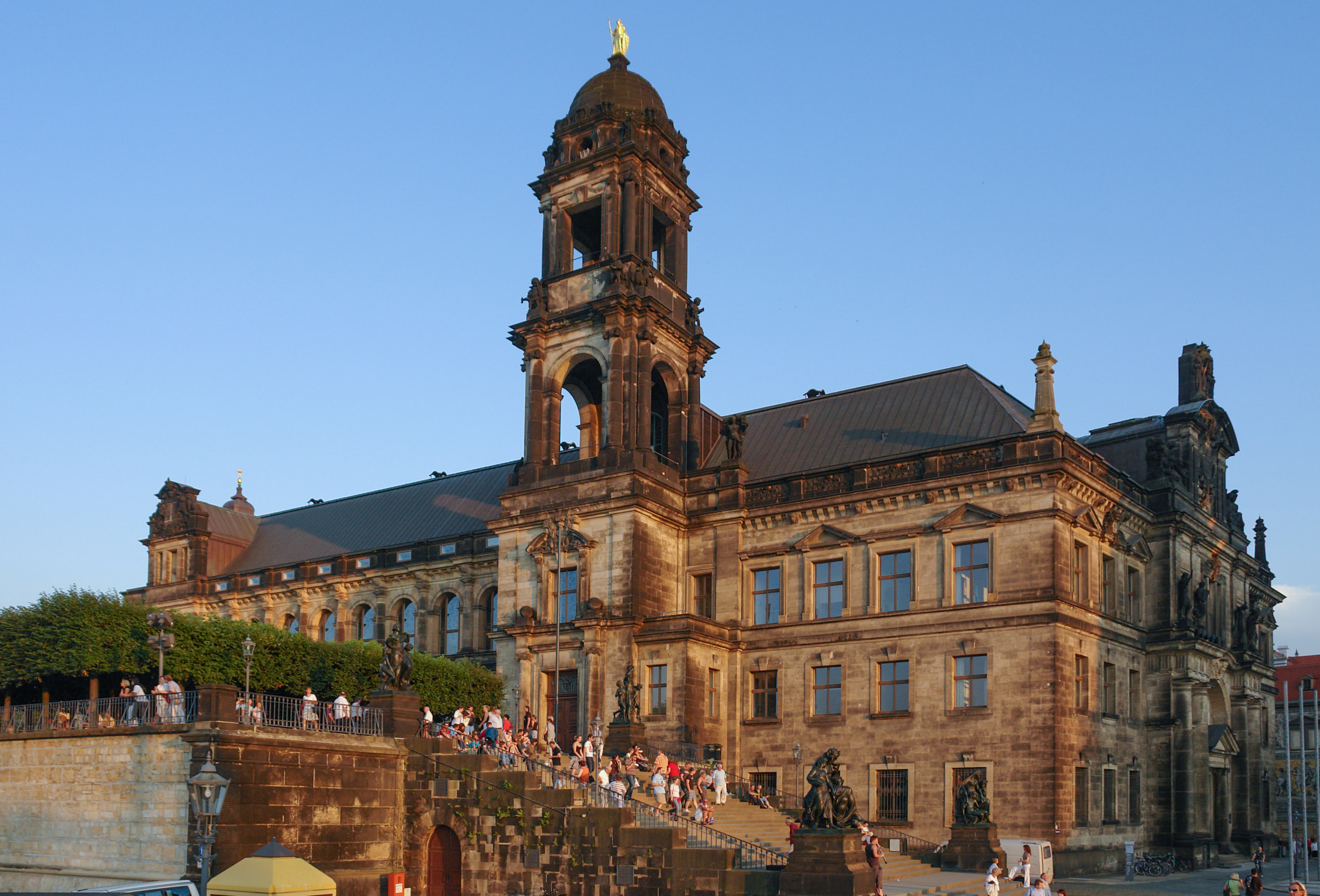
Sächsisches Ständehaus at sunset

The Sächsisches Ständehaus (Saxon House of Estates) is a building in Dresden, Saxony. It was built to house the Landtag of the Free State of Saxony.

Paul Wallot built the Sächsisches Ständehaus between 1901 and 1907. The Landtag had previously met in the Landhaus.
