= Christian Gottlob Hammer =

German painter (1779–1864)

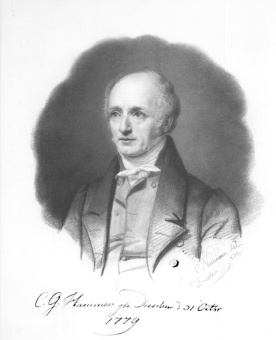
Christian Gottlob Hammer

Christian Gottlob Hammer, baptized as Gottlieb, (18 July 1779, Dresden, Saxony – 7 February 1864, Dresden), was a German landscape painter and engraver.

== Personal ==
Hammer began his studies in 1794 at the Dresden University of Visual Arts.

Four years later he had become the senior apprentice of Johann Phillip Veith, who himself had learned landscape drawing and copper etching from Adrian Zingg at the same establishment.

== Career ==
In 1816 Hammer became an academy member, joining the famous circle of Dresden Romanticism, accompanying the likes of Caspar David Friedrich and Johann Christian Klengel.

In 1829 he was appointed as Professor extraordinarius.

== Style ==
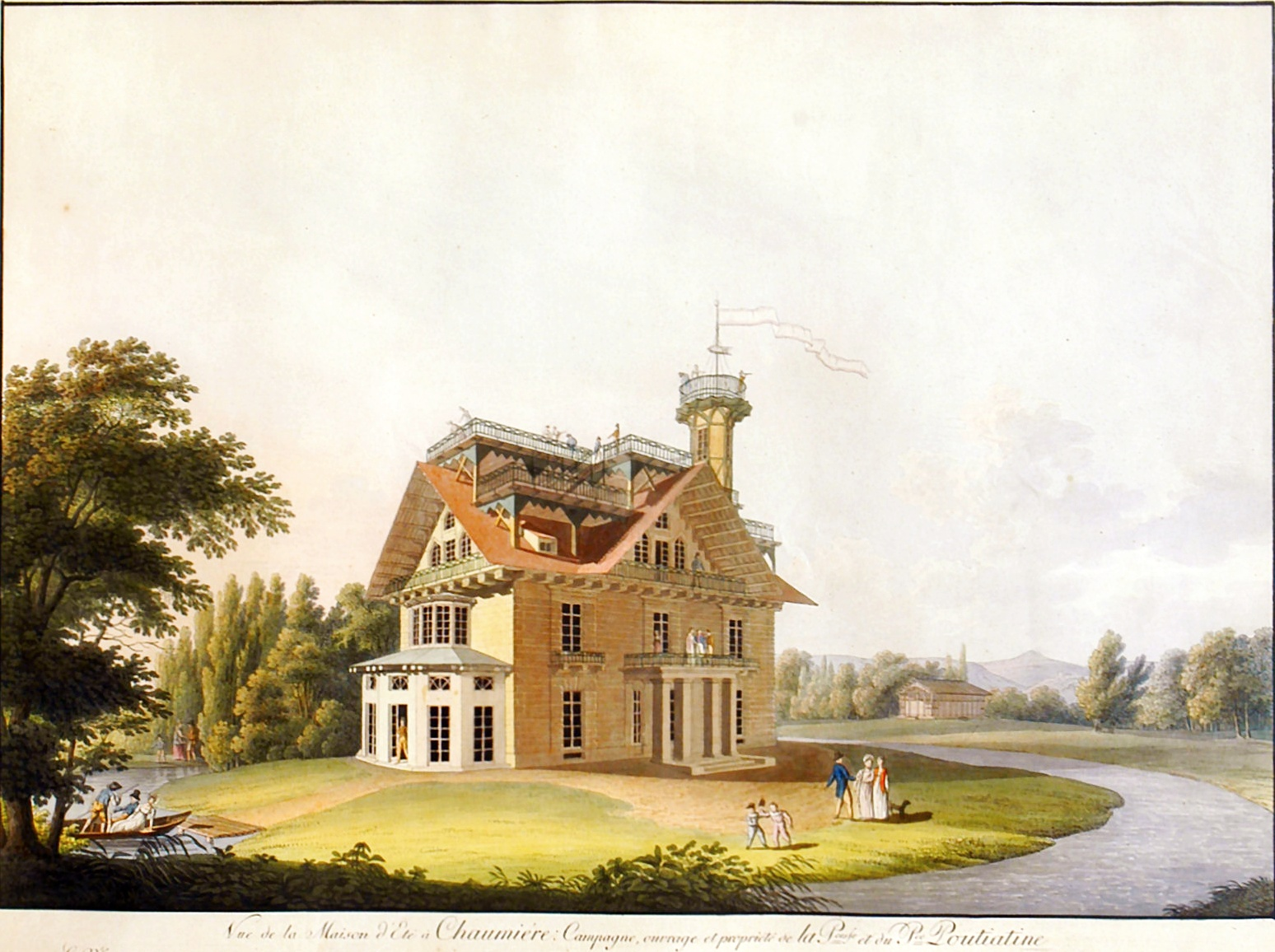
The summer house of the prince Putjatin

Hammer's works are extensive: including his own designs in sepia, watercolor, and opaque colors, and also copper etchings from his own drafts and those of other artists, such as Caspar David Friedrich, Gottlob Friedrich Thormeyer, Johann Clausen Dahl, Georg Heinrich Crola et al.

His works consist primarily of landscapes and city views, particularly in Saxony and his home town of Dresden, and the vicinity. He also took inspiration from Saxon Switzerland.

Several of Hammer's works were published by Heinrich Rittner, a Dresden art dealer, in the volume "Dresden mit seinen Pachtgebäuden und schönsten Umgebungen" ("Dresden with her splendid buildings and beautiful surroundings"). An 1810 volume printed by Carl Christian Meinhold had prompted a great deal of interest in Dresden at that time.

Hammer was one of the first painters to discover the pristine water world of the Spreewald; he created several high-romantic pictures of this unique European landscape.

Around the period 1820–1840, Count Hermann Rochus zu Lynar (1797–1878), the owner of the castle of Lübbenau, commissioned Hammer to paint several views of the castle.

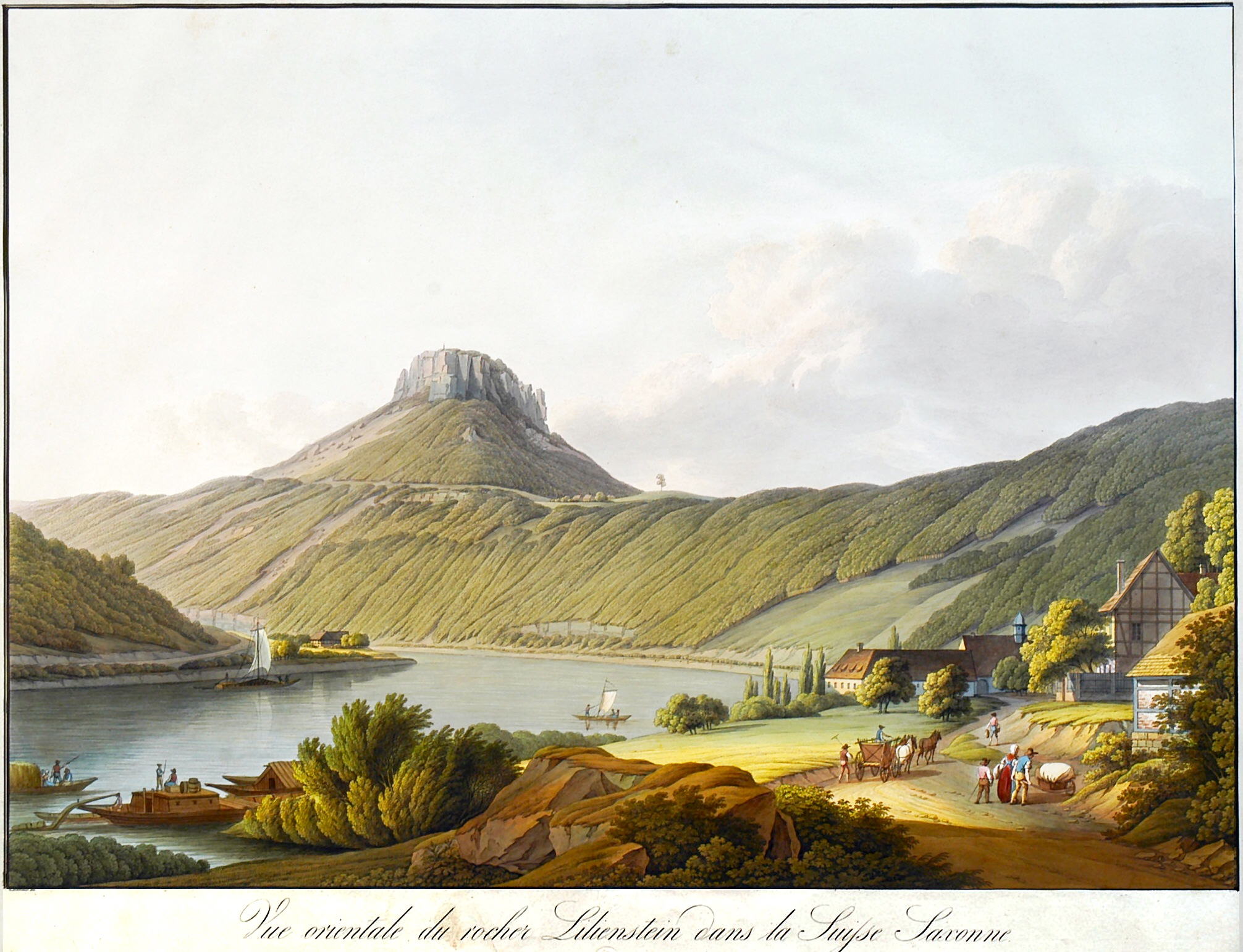
The Lilienstein rock in Saxon Switzerland

A great admirer of C. G. Hammer's works was Johann Wolfgang Goethe. He and Hammer met in the artist's Dresden studio during Goethe's stay in the town during 1810.

== Public collections ==
- Albertina, Vienna, a set of Hammer's works collected by Duke Albert of Saxe-Teschen.
- Dresden City Museum.
- Goethe National Museum, Weimar.
- Lübbenau castle.
- Dresden State Art Collections.
