= Brühl's Terrace =

Historic architectural ensemble in Dresden, Germany

Coordinates: 51°03′12″N 13°44′25″E

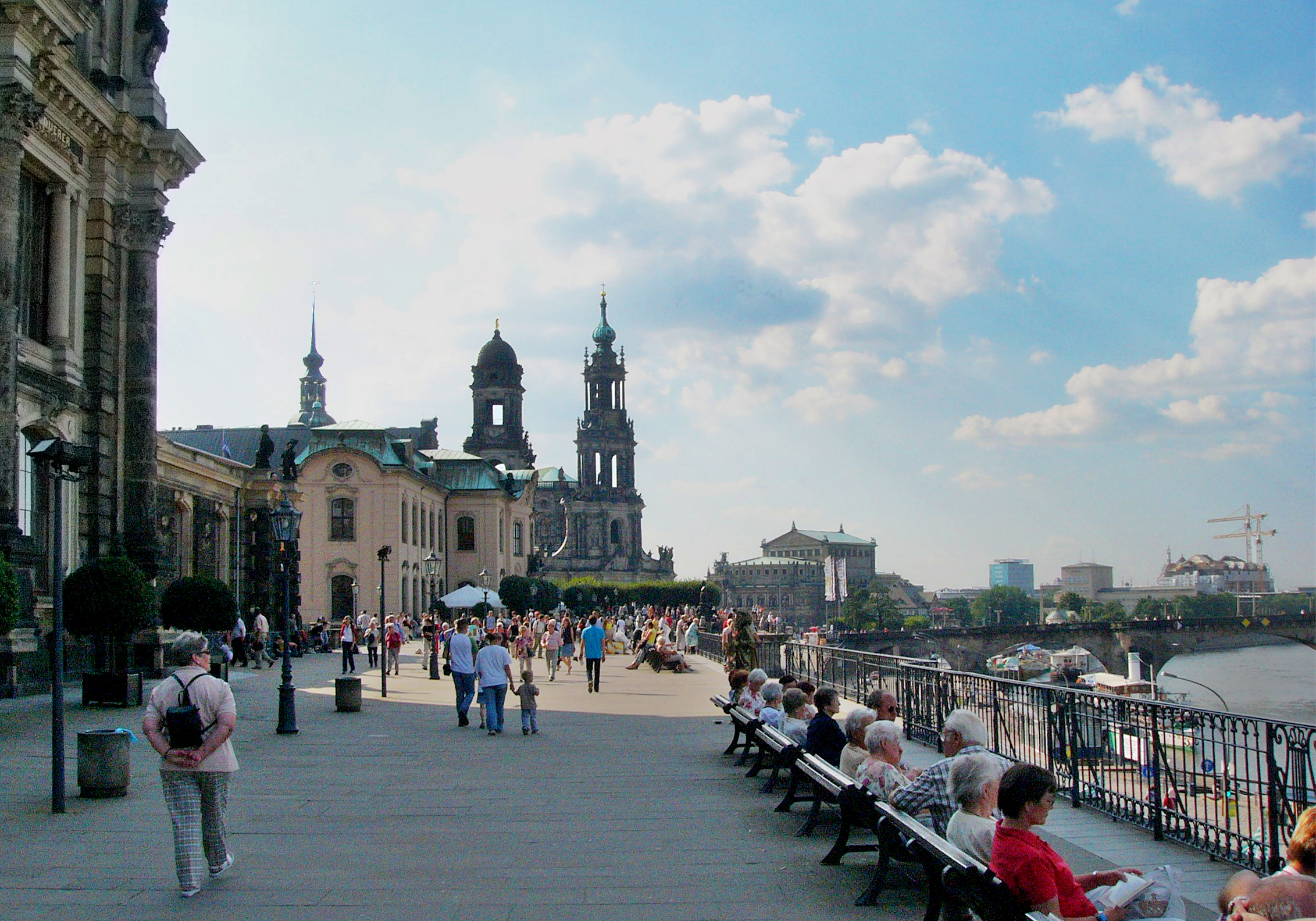
View towards Hofkirche and Semperoper

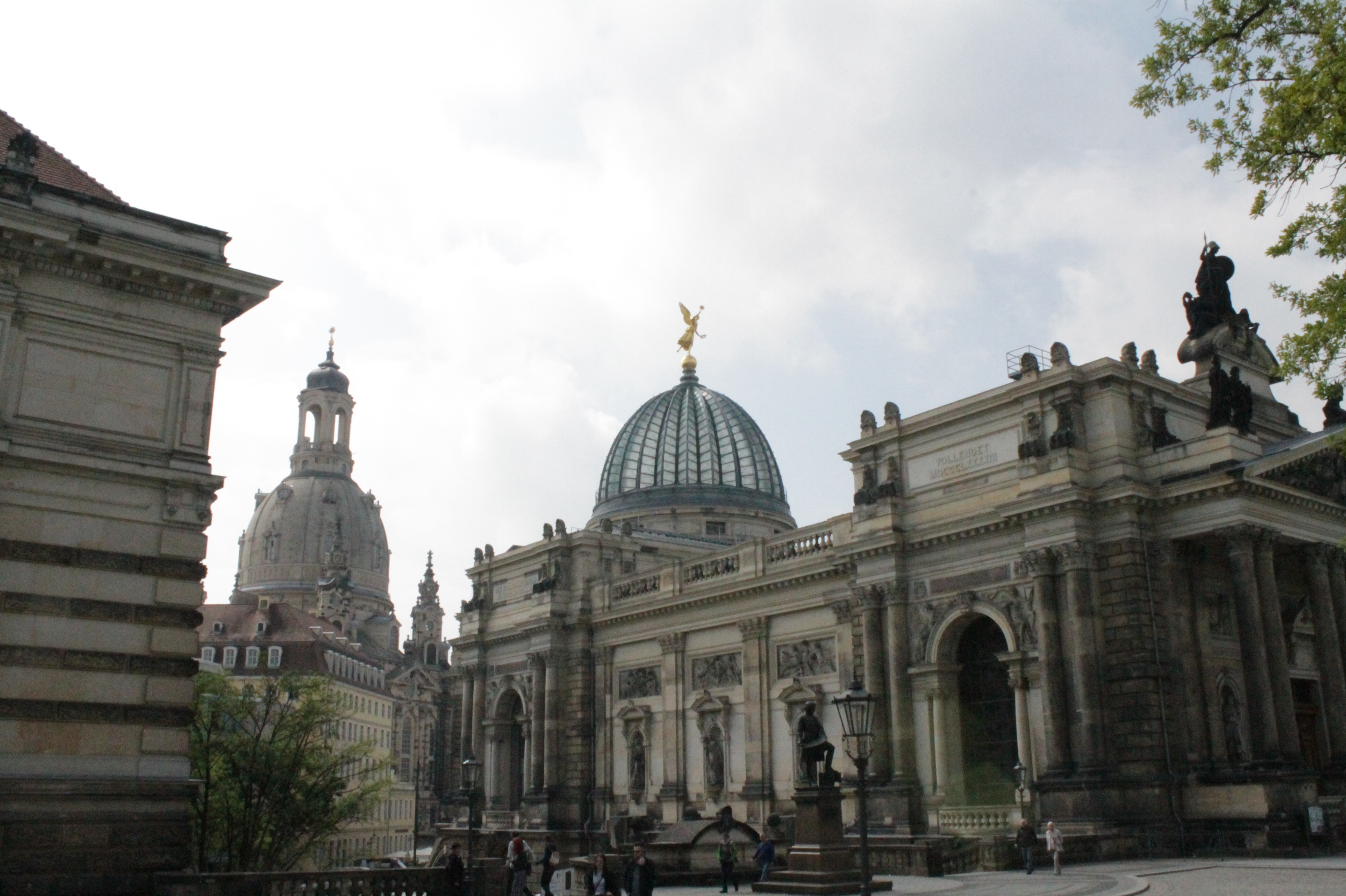
The Albertinum with Frauenkirche behind, from Brühl's Terrace

Brühl's Terrace (German: Brühlsche Terrasse) is a historic architectural ensemble in Dresden, Germany. Nicknamed "The Balcony of Europe", the terrace stretches high above the bank of the river Elbe, and is located north of the recently rebuilt Neumarkt Square and the Frauenkirche.

== History and character ==
The present-day terrace was part of the city's fortifications, rebuilt upon the 1546/47 Schmalkaldic War at the behest of Elector Maurice of Saxony and his successors Augustus and Christian. The name Brühl's Terrace is a reference to Count Heinrich von Brühl, Minister of Elector Frederick Augustus II, who from 1737 had a city palace with a gallery, a library and adjacent gardens built on the location. In 1747 the whole terrace was given to him by the Saxon elector as a gift for the innovative introduction of a betterment tax.

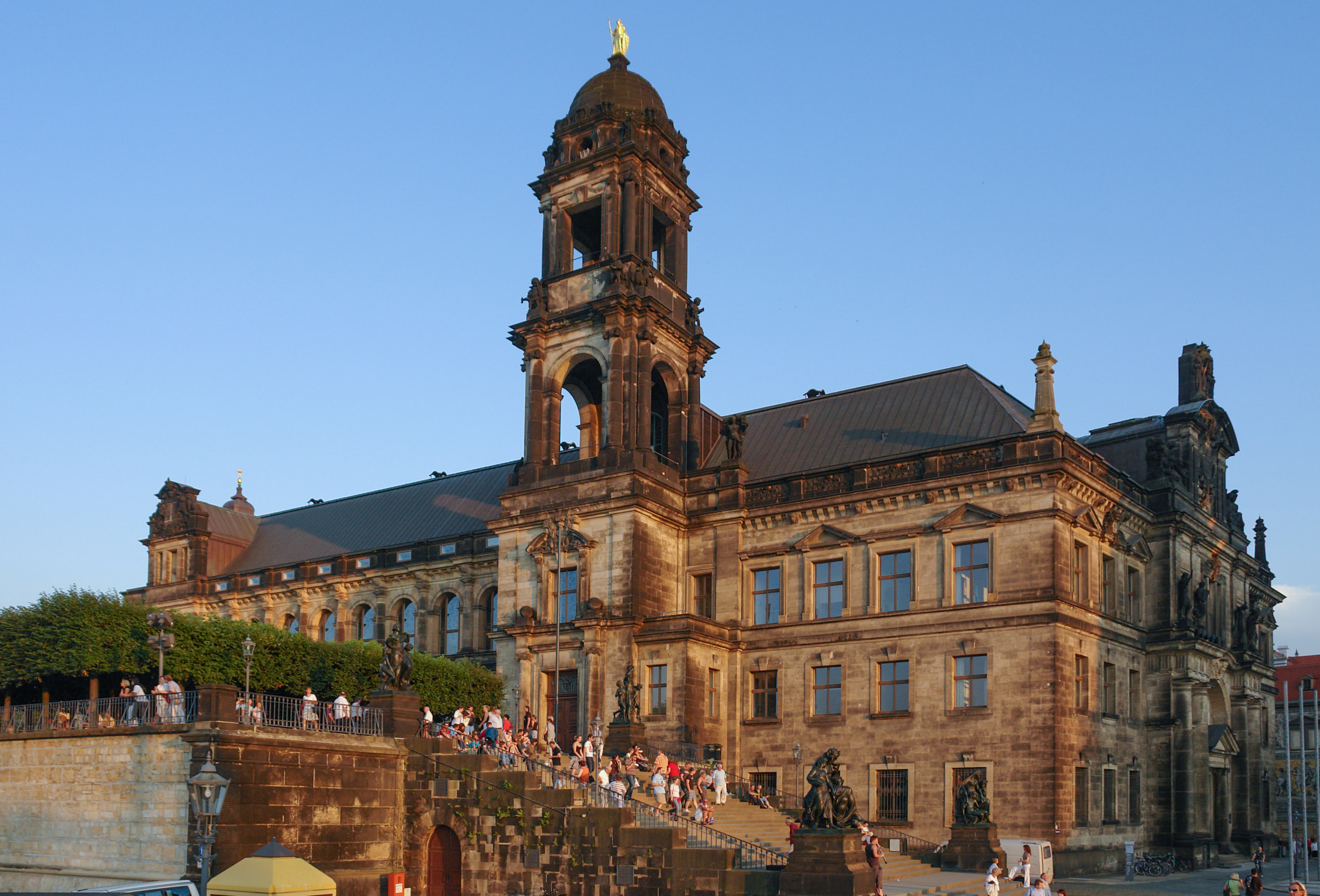
Brühl's Stairs and Ständehaus

After the Saxon defeat at the Battle of Leipzig and the occupation by Russian troops, military governor Prince Nikolai Grigorjevich Repnin-Volkonski ordered the opening to the public in 1814. He charged the architect Gottlob Friedrich Thormeyer with the building of a flight of stairs at the western end to reach the terrace from Castle Square and Augustus Bridge. The Brühl Palace was demolished in the course of the building of the Saxon Ständehaus in 1900.

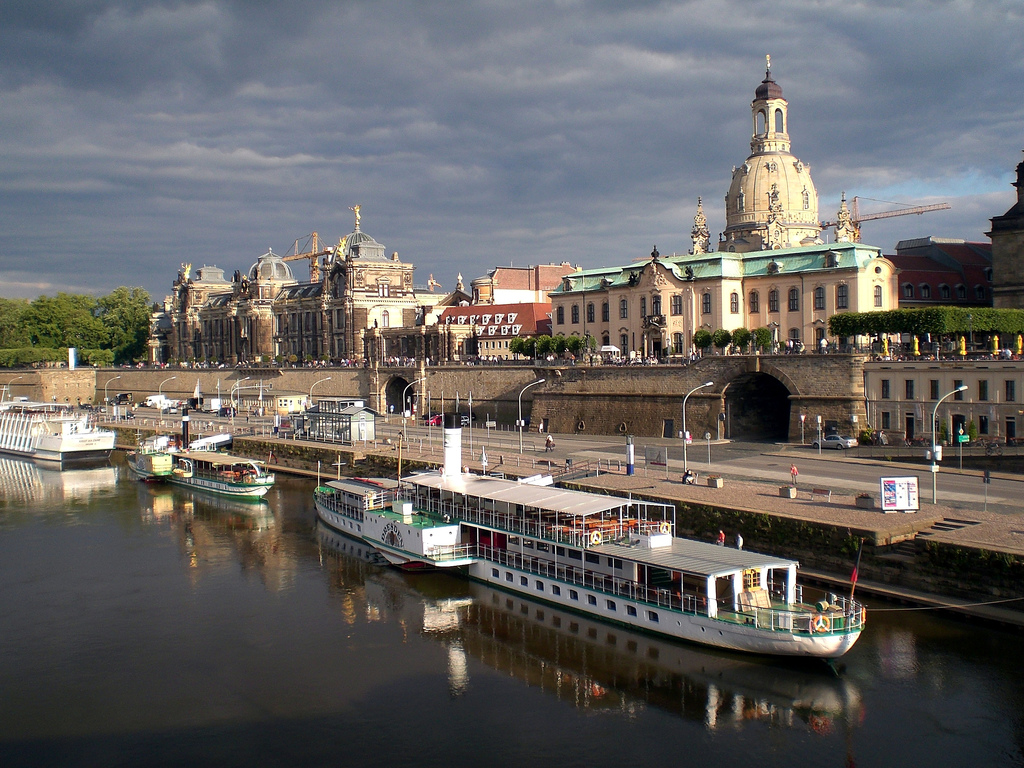
Academy of Fine Arts and Frauenkirche

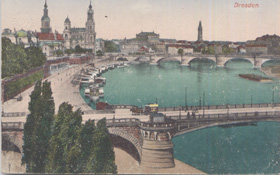
Around 1900, looking similar today. Bruehl's Terrace (left) is made up of several buildings. The image shows the Carolabrücke bridge in the front and the better-known Augustusbrücke bridge in the background.

The ensemble was totally destroyed in February 1945 when the city was heavily hit by the Allied Bombing of Dresden during the end phase of World War II. Today, it has been rebuilt; the precise amount restored is difficult to say as a percentage, but in general one can say the ensemble looks very much the same today as it did in the past.

Today, Brühl's Terrace is again one of the main city landmarks besides the Frauenkirche (Church of our Lady), Dresden Castle, the Hofkirche and buildings on Theatre Square such as the Zwinger and the Semperoper, which are all located in the vicinity. At the Bärenzwinger students' club near the monument for Johann Friedrich Böttger, one can see a fingerprint in a guard rail of the terrace garden. This dactylogram is said to be proof of the strength of Augustus the Strong, who is said to have left the mark - but is only one of many myths surrounding August, such as the legend that he fathered 365 children.

== Architectural parts of the terrace ==
Most people enter the terrace from the Schlossplatz (Castle Square) on the west end of the terrace. Besides Saxony's Supreme Court a staircase with four sculptures (The Four Times of Day) leads from the Schlossplatz (Castle Square) up to Brühl's Terrace. One of the next buildings to the right is the Academy of Fine Arts. There is an ensemble of important buildings, such as the Albertinum.

- Sächsisches Ständehaus by Paul Wallot
- Sekundogenitur
- Academy of Fine Arts
- Jungfernbastei (Belvederehügel)
- Moritzmonument
- Bärenzwinger basement vault
- Hofgärtnerhaus
- Albertinum
- Delphinbrunnen
- Staircase by Gottlob Friedrich Thormeyer

== Statues of Note ==
- Ludwig Richter
- Ernst Rietschel by Johannes Schilling
- Gottfried Semper by Johannes Schilling
- Johann Friedrich Böttger
- The "Four Times of the Day" group (Vier Tageszeiten) by Johannes Schilling

== The balconies of Europe and of Dresden ==
Brühl's Terrace is known as the "Balcony of Europe", a name which was first thought up and used at the beginning of the 19th century and which since then has been used in all kinds of literature.

The name "Balcony of Dresden", on the other hand, is more regionally used for a tower six kilometers further to the East on a slope by the Elbe in Loschwitz, an area known for expensive living.

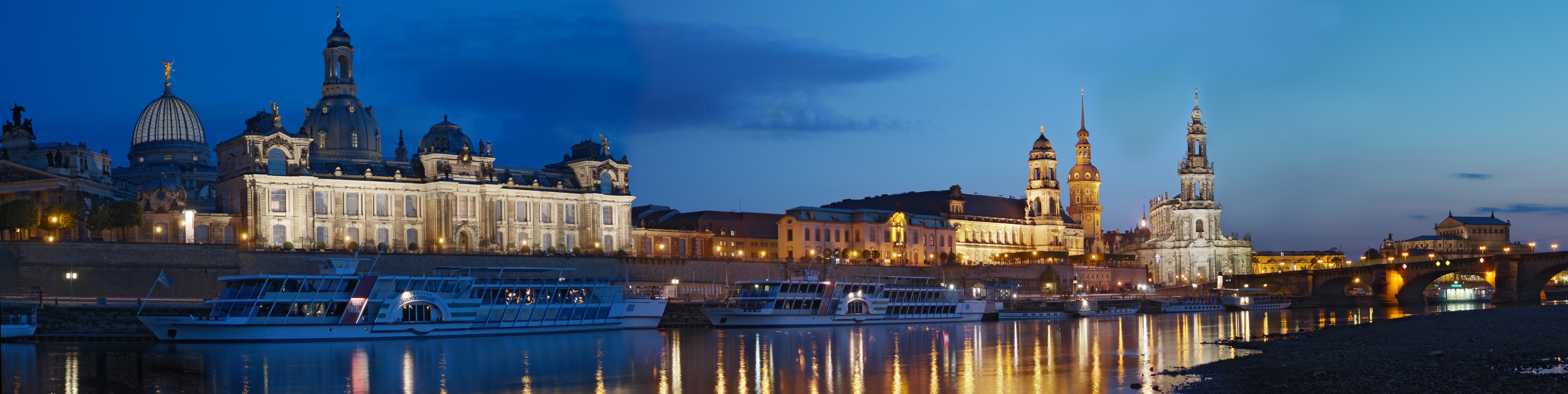
View over Brühl's Terrace and Dresden old town
