= Palais Flemming-Sulkowski =

Mansion in Dresden, Saxony, Germany

Coordinates: 51°03′00″N 13°44′35″E

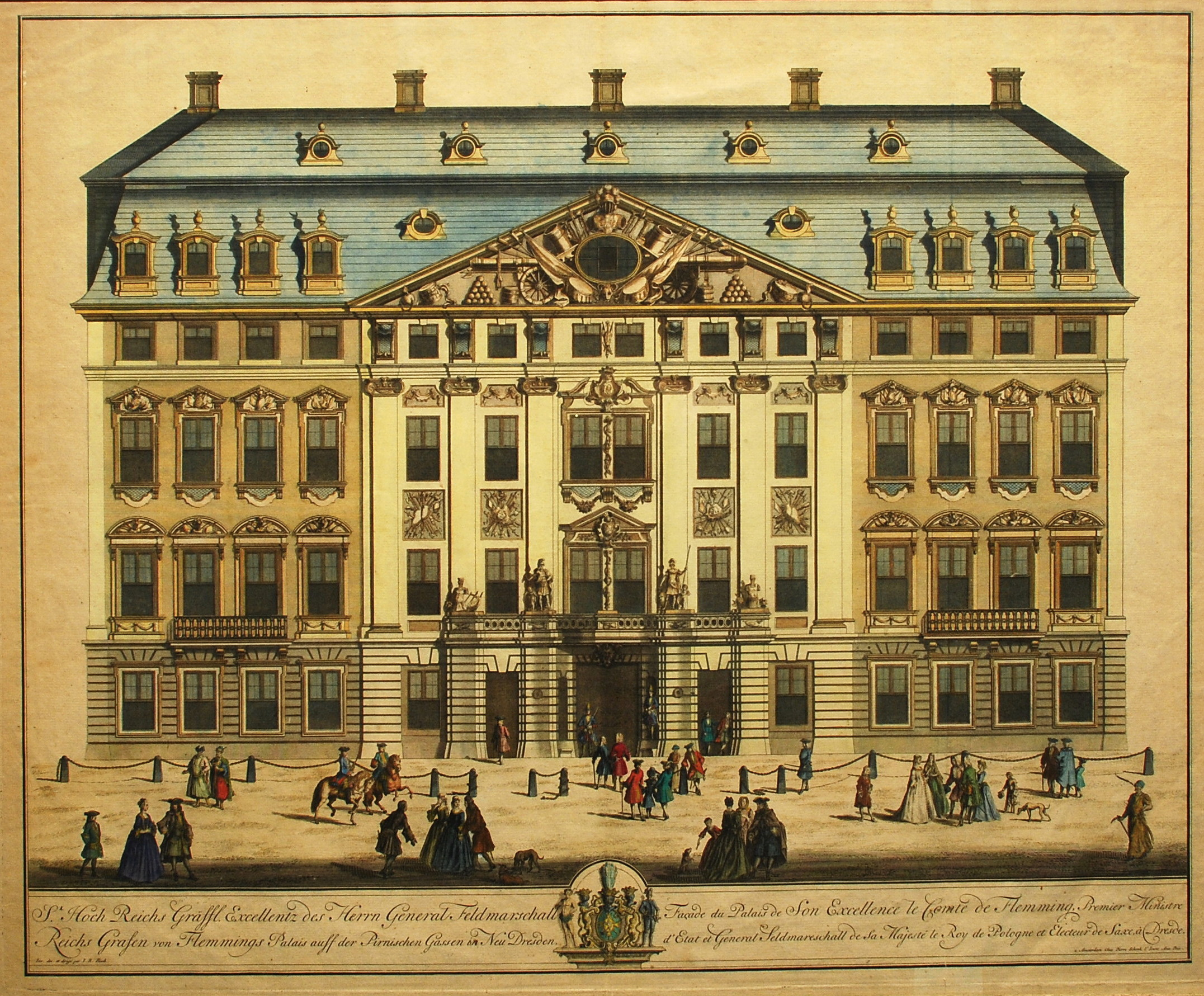
Palais Flemming

The Palais Flemming-Sulkowski was a Baroque city mansion in Dresden, Germany. It stood on the Inneren Pirnaischen Gasse, on the site now occupied by the city's Landhaus.

The mansion featured a 14 bay facade with rich Baroque articulation built with help of architect, Johann Fäsch, after 1704 for the Lord High Steward August Ferdinand Pflug.

In 1714, the Field Minister and Cabinet Minister Jakob Heinrich Von Flemming had acquired the palace. Upon gaining control, he embellished and enlarged the palace's staircase, and decorated the courtyard witharcades, fountains, and a grotto.

In 1717, Johann Sebastian Bach performed a concert here for a court society after Louis Merchand had withdrew from the musical competition.

The mansion had many people acquire it from 1724 -1736:

Flemming (1726 - 1728)

Augustus the Strong (in 1728 before gifting it to August Christoph von Wackerbath)

August Christoph Von Wackerbath (until 1736, at his death)

Alexander John Von Sulkowski (1736 until 1746)
