= Friedrich August Krubsacius =

German architect, teacher, and architectural theoretician (1718–1789)

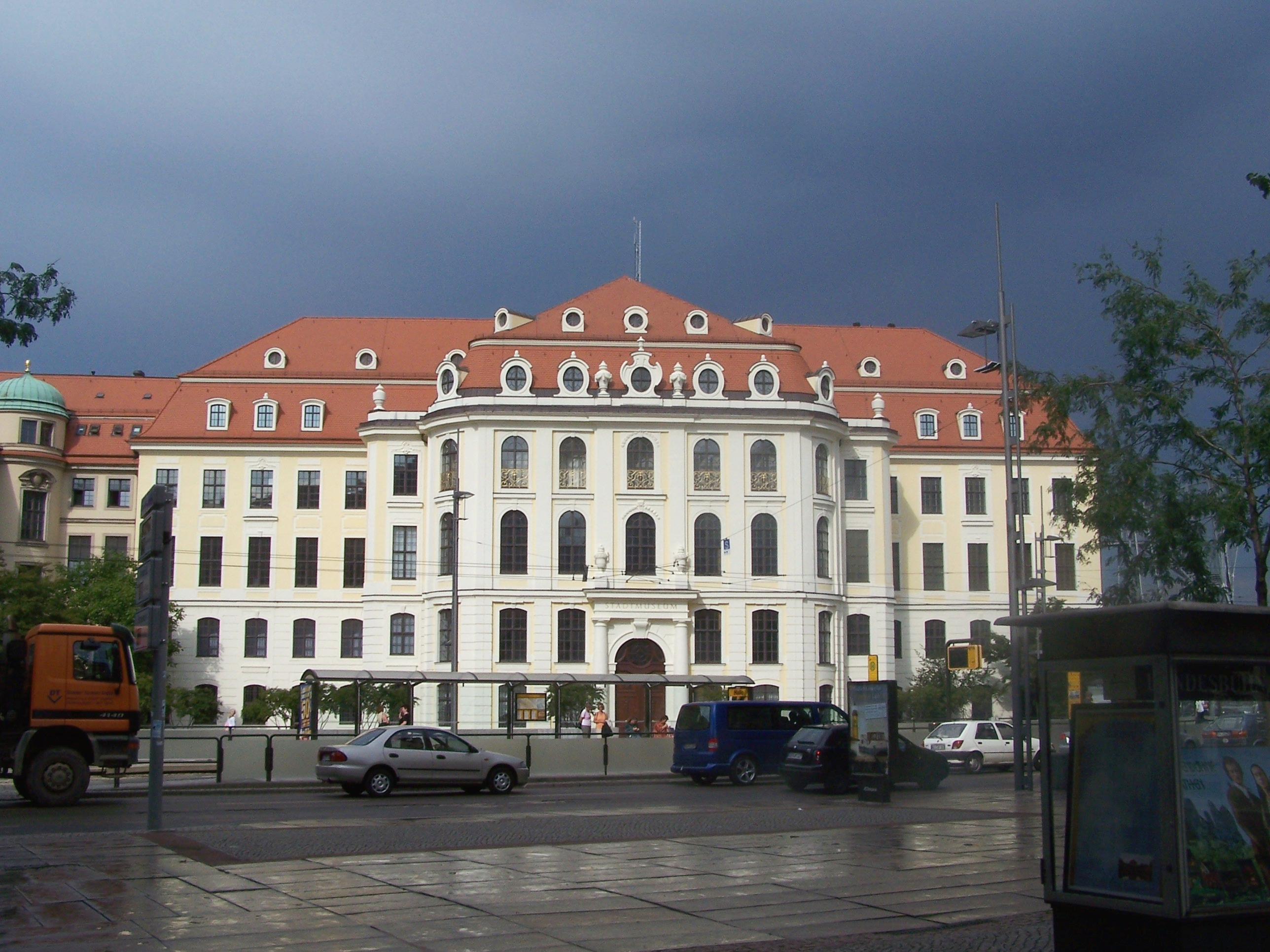
Dresen Altes Landhaus

Friedrich August Krubsacius (21 March 1718 - 28 November 1789) was a German architect, teacher, and architectural theoretician.

He was born at Dresden. In 1755 he was made court architect to the Electorate of Saxony, in 1764 professor of architecture at the Dresden Academy of Fine Arts and in 1776 chief architect of Saxony.

The work of Krubascius include palaces for Johann Georg, Chevalier de Saxe, and the Landhaus of Dresden, completed in 1776 and now housing the Dresden City Museum. Among his students were Gottlob Friedrich Thormeyer and Christian Friedrich Schuricht.
