= Landhaus (Dresden) =

Historic building in Dresden, Germany

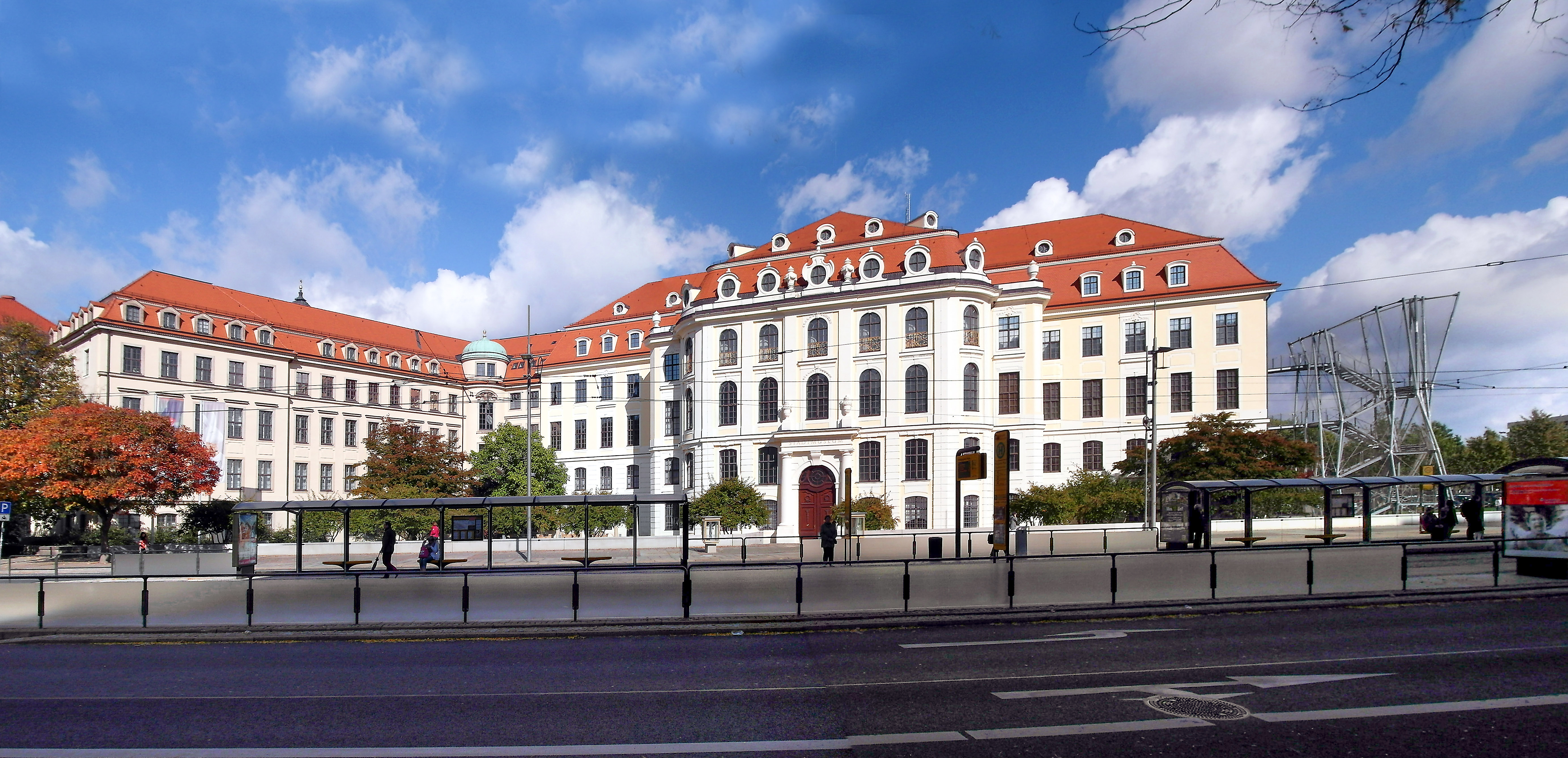

General information
- Type: Government building, now a museum
- Architectural style: Baroque
- Location: Dresden, Germany
- Coordinates: 51.0501°N 13.7430°E
- Current tenants: Dresden City Museum, Dresden City Art Gallery
- Year built: 1770–1776
- Completed: 1776
- Opened: October 1775

Design and construction
- Architect: Friedrich August Krubsacius

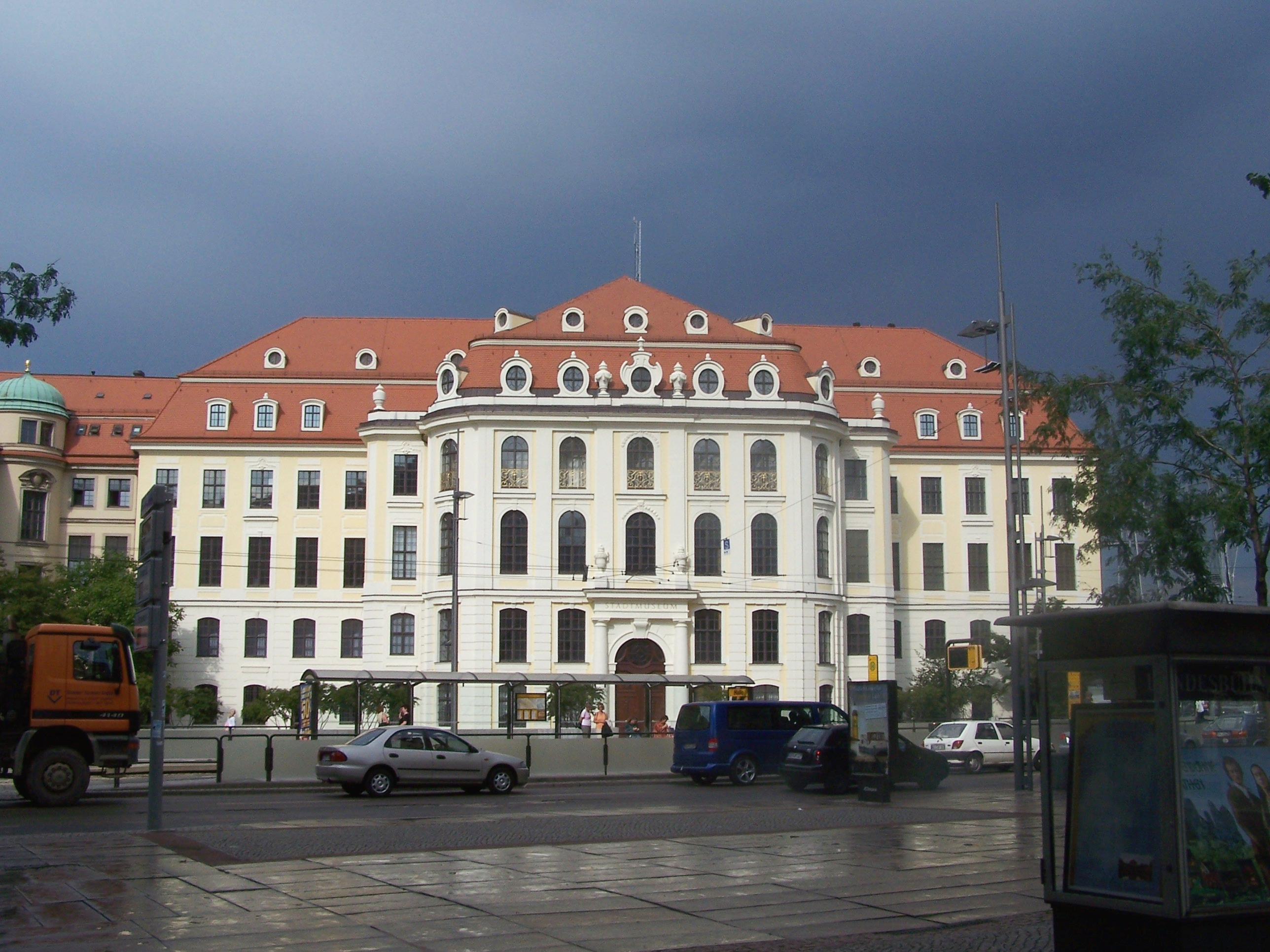
The Landhaus, from Wilsdruffer Straße

The Landhaus is a historic building in Dresden, Germany. The house is designed to Saxony region's Landstand, it was built in the Baroque style between 1770 and 1776 by Friedrich August Krubsacius on the site of the former Palais Flemming-Sulkowski. In September 1775, the Obersteuerkollegium moved into it and in October the Landstand first sat there. It now houses the Dresden City Museum and the Dresden City Art Gallery.

== History ==
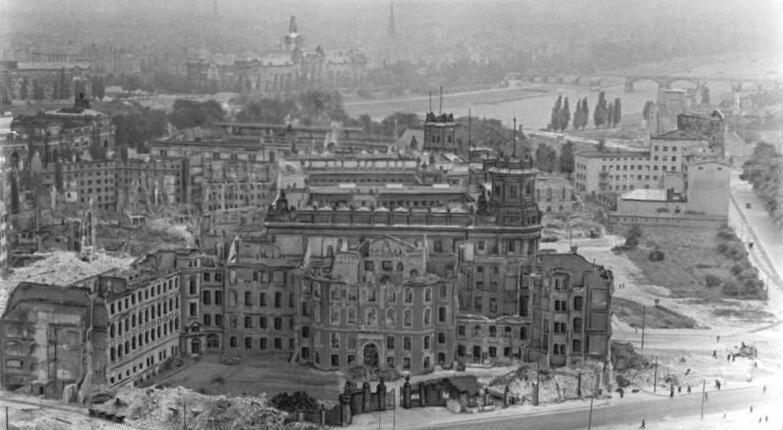
Landhaus in August 1951.

The building was constructed in the late 18th century at Pirna Gate, in the east of the historic inner city. The bombing of Dresden in World War II destroyed the building. Since the reshaping of the Dresdner streets, Wilsdruffer road was extended and broadened as a highway; part of the front garden was lost because of this. The eastern wing of the villa was eliminated in this context and the great gate of the front garden to the baroque garden was added.

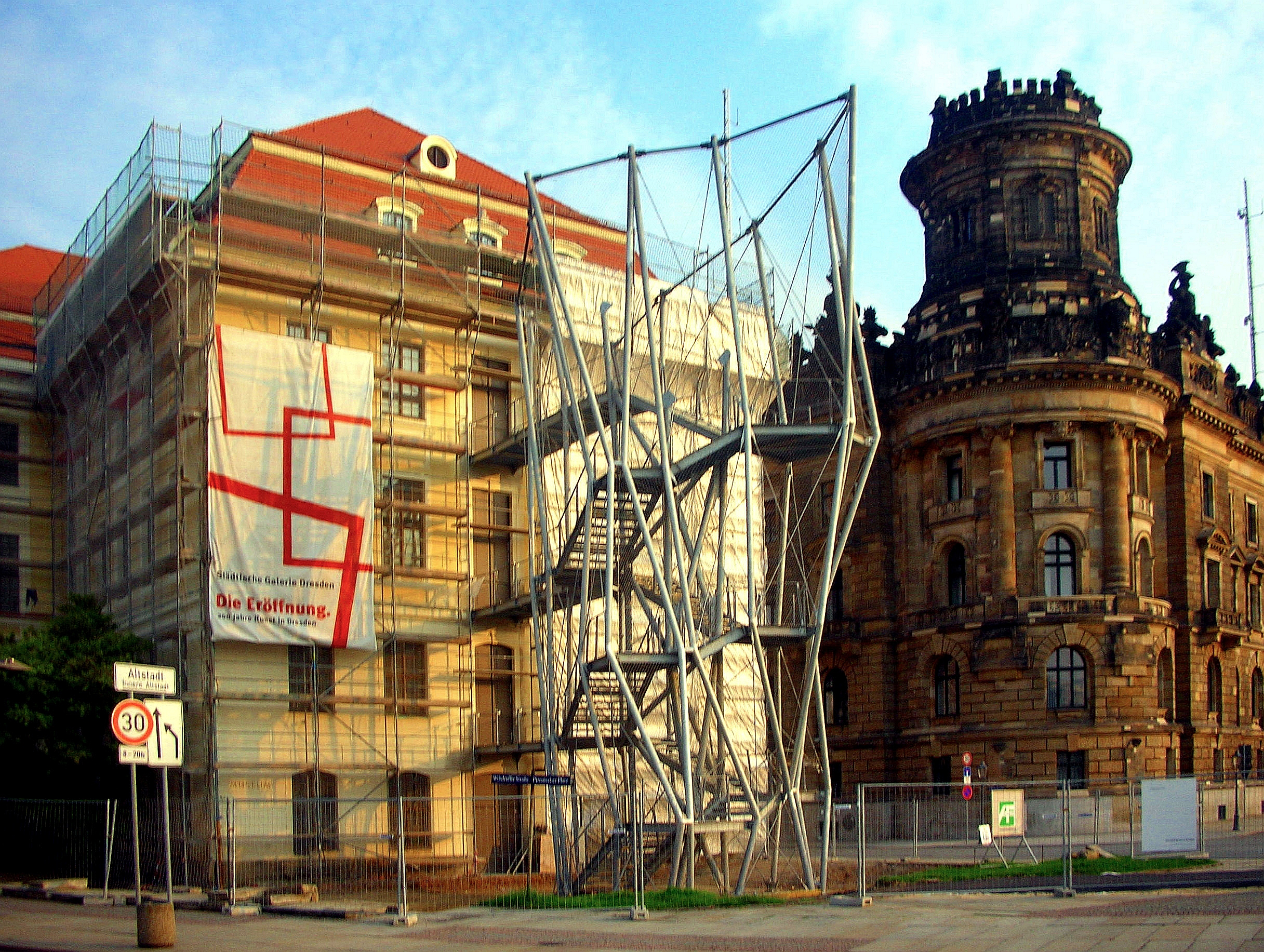
The controversial fire escape.

The reconstruction was carried out until 1965. Between 2005 and 2006, the building was renovated and a fire escape was added. This post-modern designed structure is controversial in Dresden.
