= Gottlob Friedrich Thormeyer =

German artist and designer (1775–1842)

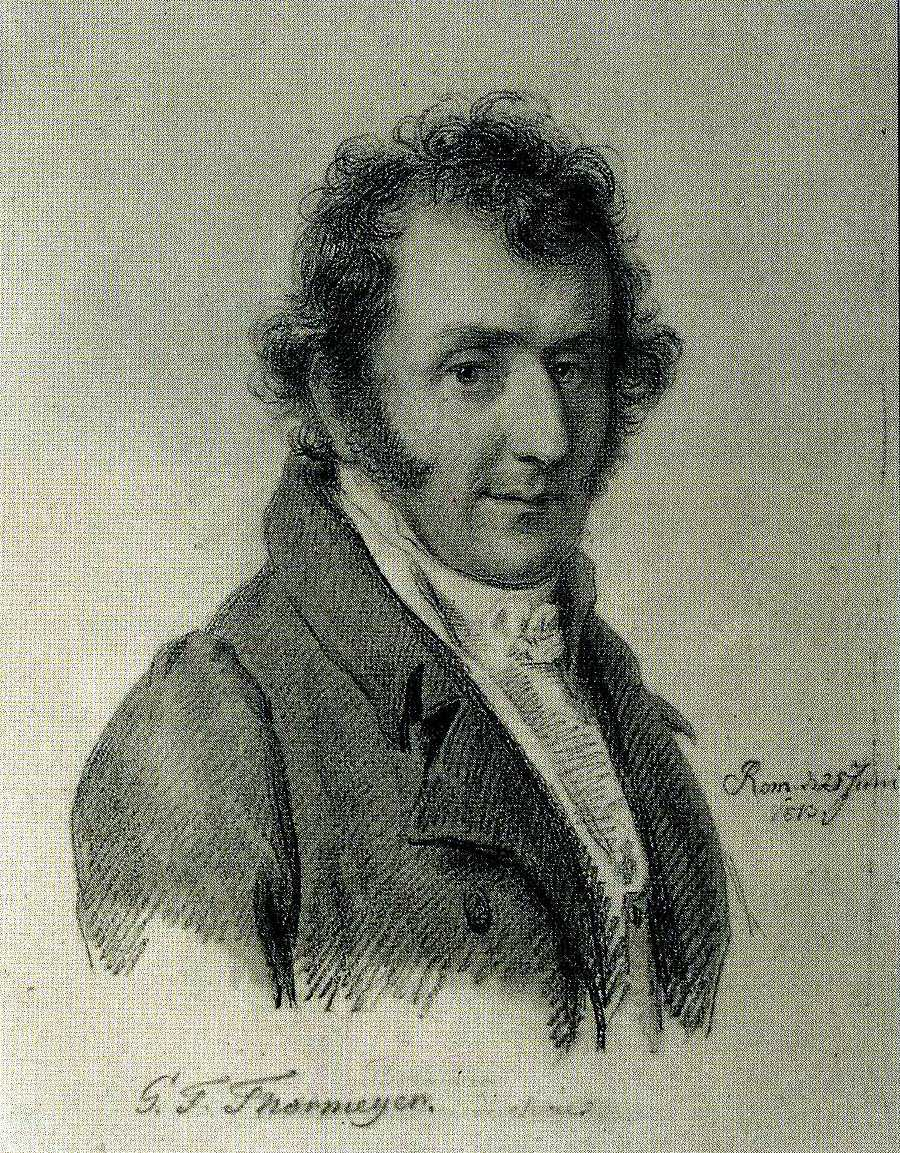
Thormeyer 1813

Gottlob Friedrich Thormeyer (23 October 1775 - 11 February 1842) was a German representative of neoclassical architecture.

== Life and artwork ==
=== Education and early work ===
Thormeyer was born in the Protestant Kreuzkirche parish, Dresden. He started to study painting in very early years at the Dresden Academy of Fine Arts under Giovanni Battista Casanova, but changed to architecture in 1791. Friedrich August Krubsacius and Gottlob August Hölzer were his professors there. Since 1800, he belonged to the royal staff as Hofbaukondukteur. Thormeyer created some well known drawings depicting sights of Dresden and its surrounding, e.g. Dom Meißen, Schloss Pillnitz and Katholische Hofkirche (drawn 1807). Many of them were later etched by Christian Gottlob Hammer. Some neo-classical buildings arose in little towns and villages around Dresden, like the Vorwerk Kleindrebnitz.

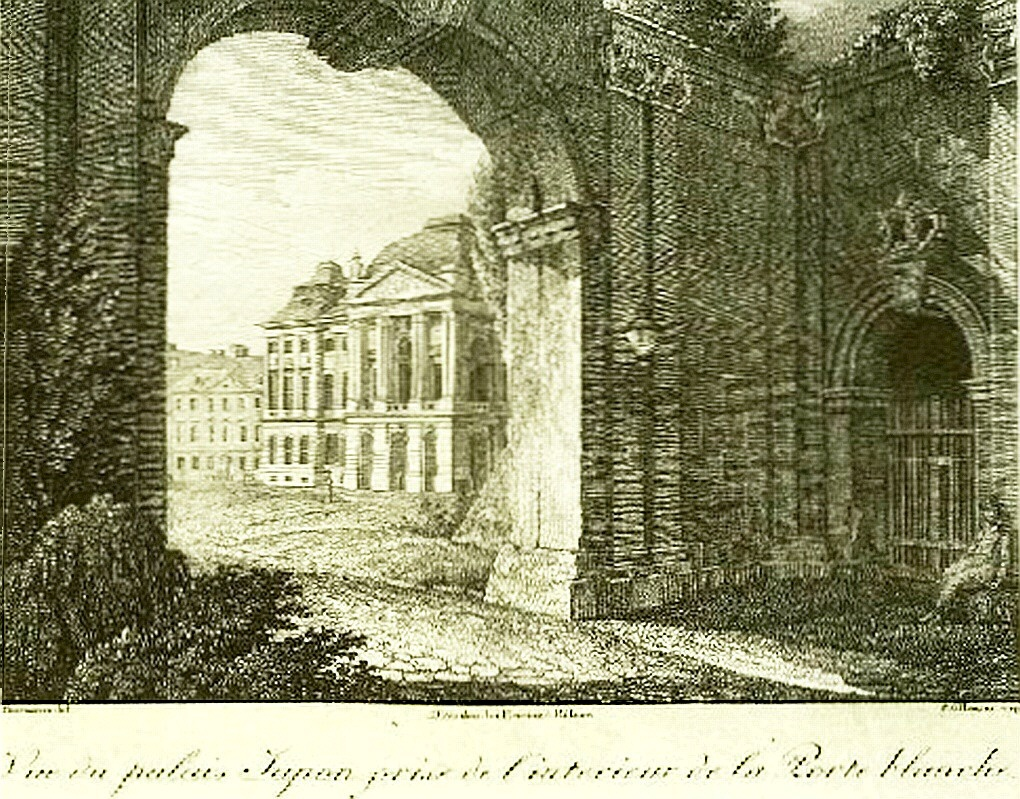
White gate Dresden.

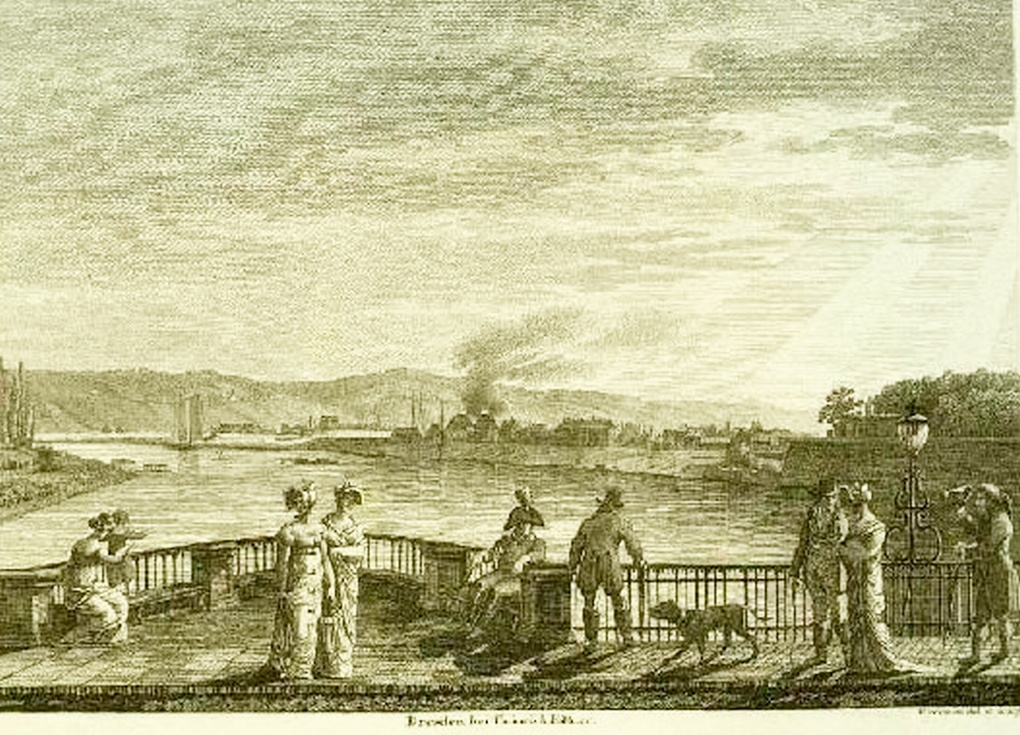
View to the river Elbe.

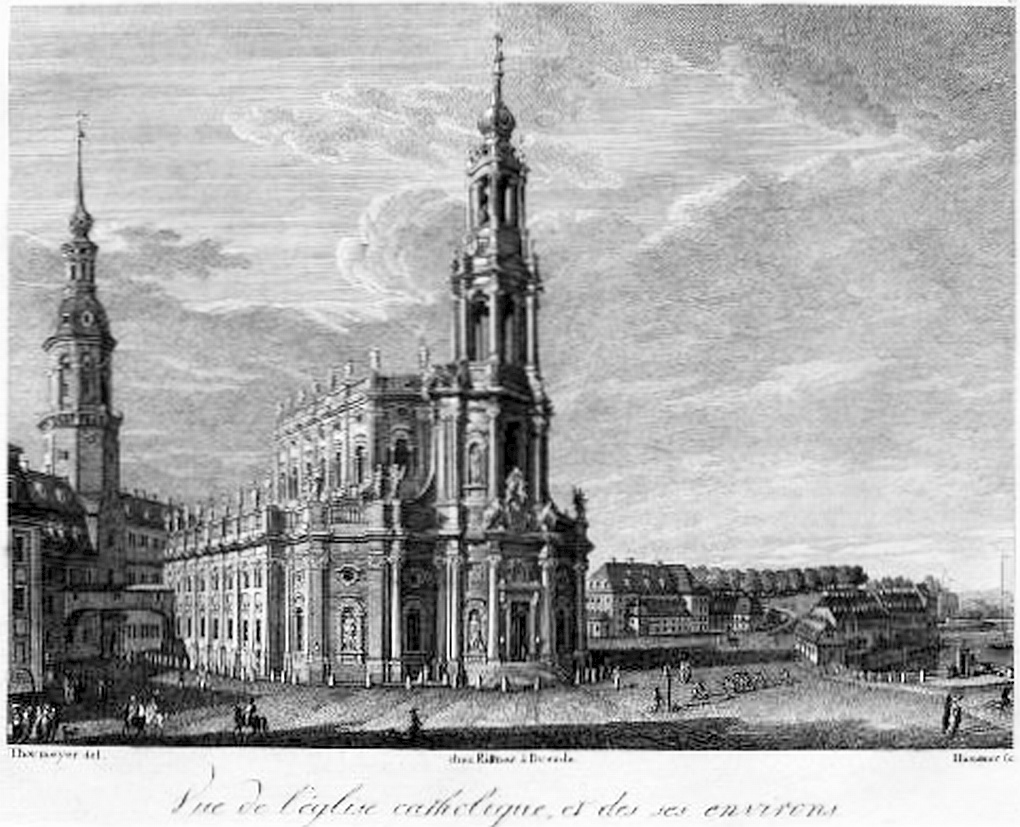
Katholische Hofkirche.

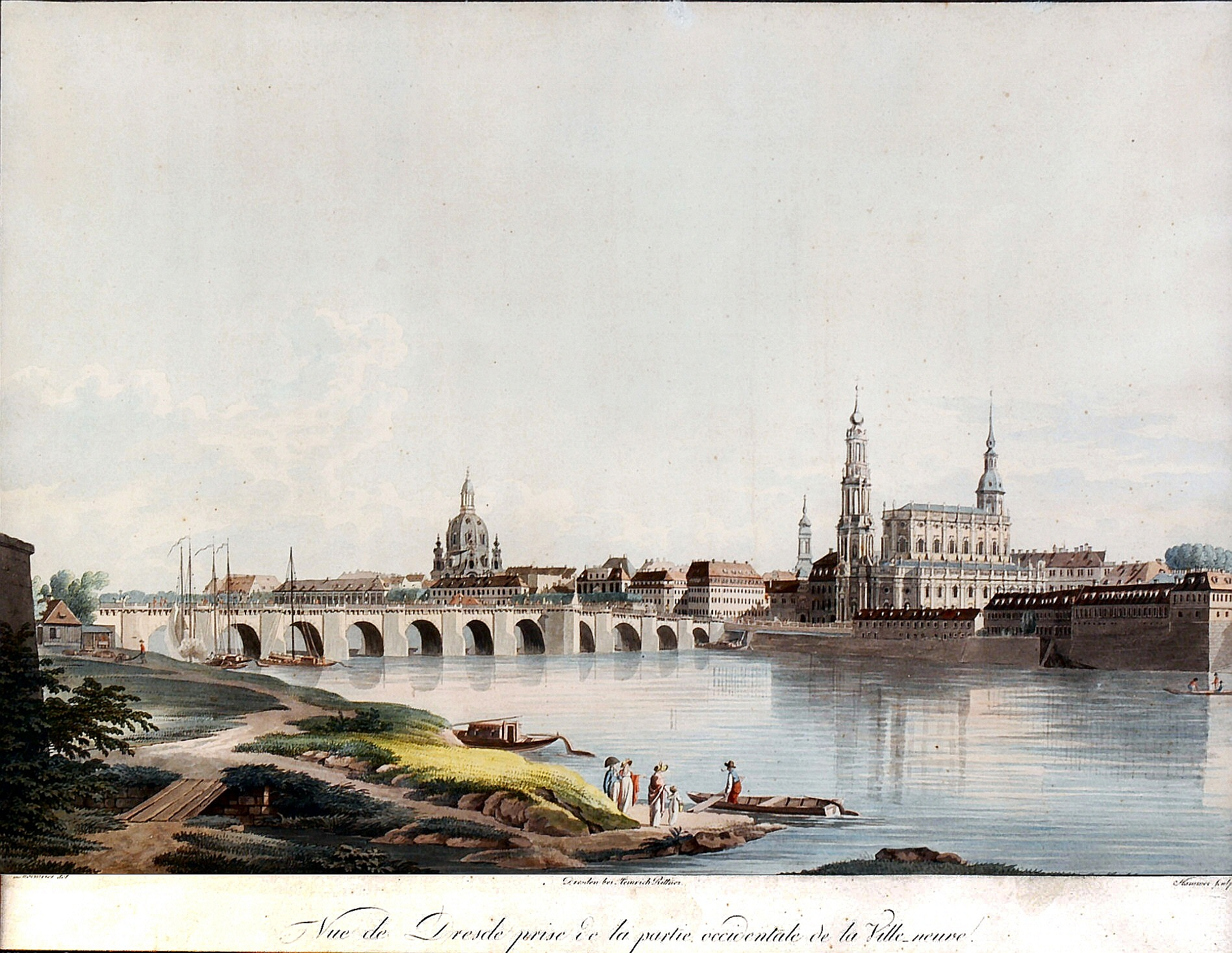
Dresden.

=== Traces of the War of the Sixth Coalition ===
King Frederick Augustus I of Saxony appointed Thormeyer royal court architect in 1812. Afterwards, Thormeyer went on a study trip, which led him e.g. to Switzerland and Italy, thus avoiding direct involvement in the War of the Sixth Coalition. The portrait above was drawn by Carl Christian Vogel von Vogelstein during Thormeyer's stay 1813 in Rome. Many of his works, however, are in close connection to this war:

- 1812: Etching of the decoration on occasion of the visit of Napoleon to Dresden
- 1814: Design of memorials for Jean Victor Moreau in Dresden and Theodor Körner in Wöbbelin
- 1815 - 1818: Rebuilding of Bischofswerda, burned down during occupation by Napoleonic troops.
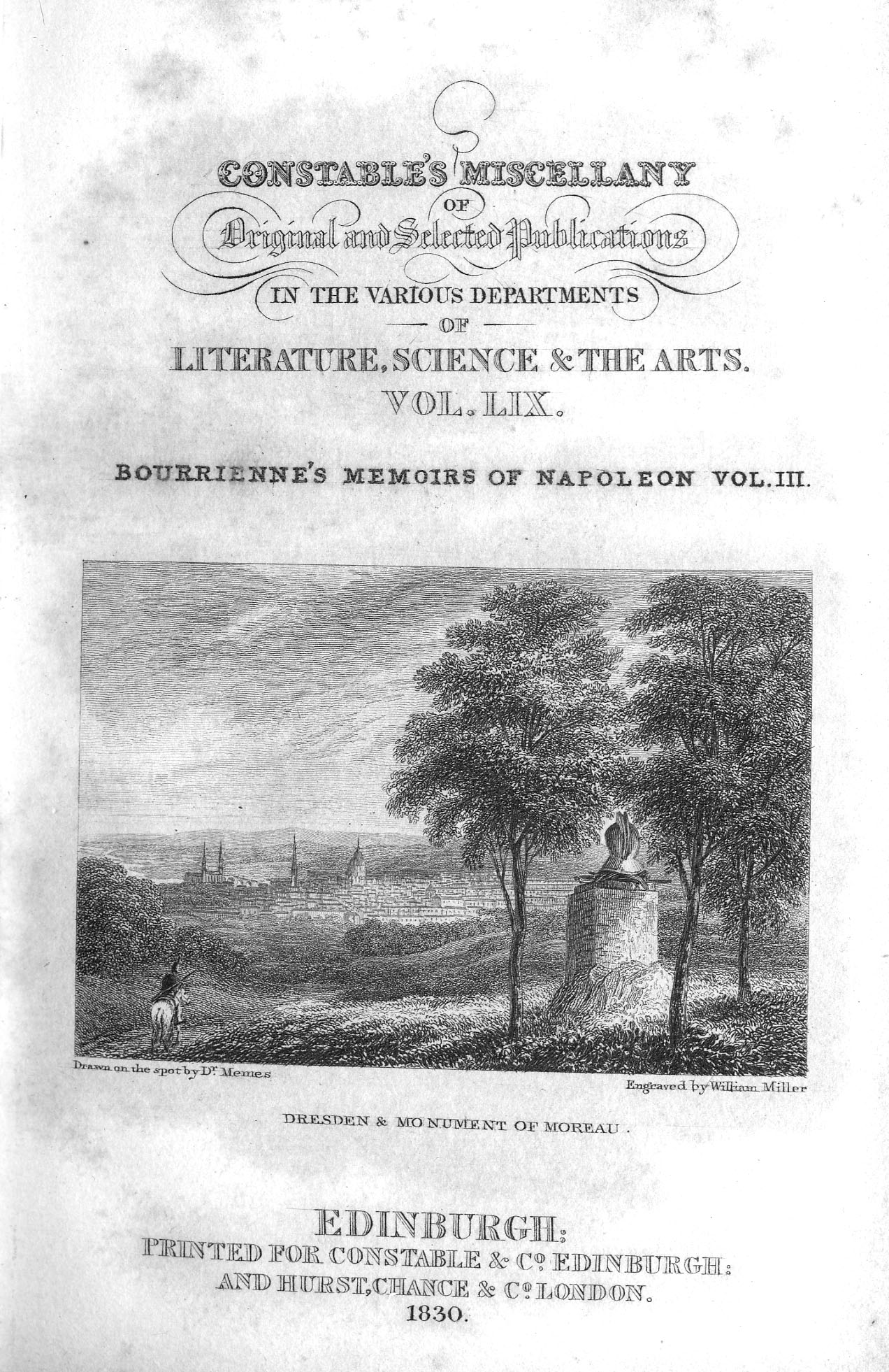
Jean Victor Moreau memorial.

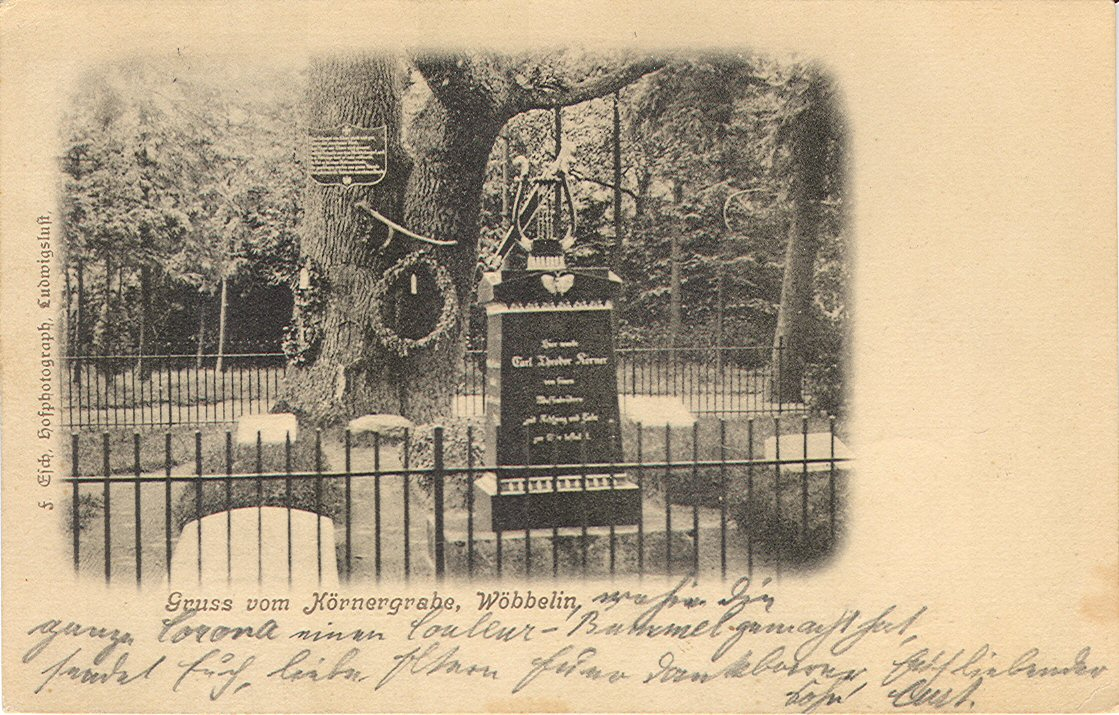
Theodor Körner memorial.

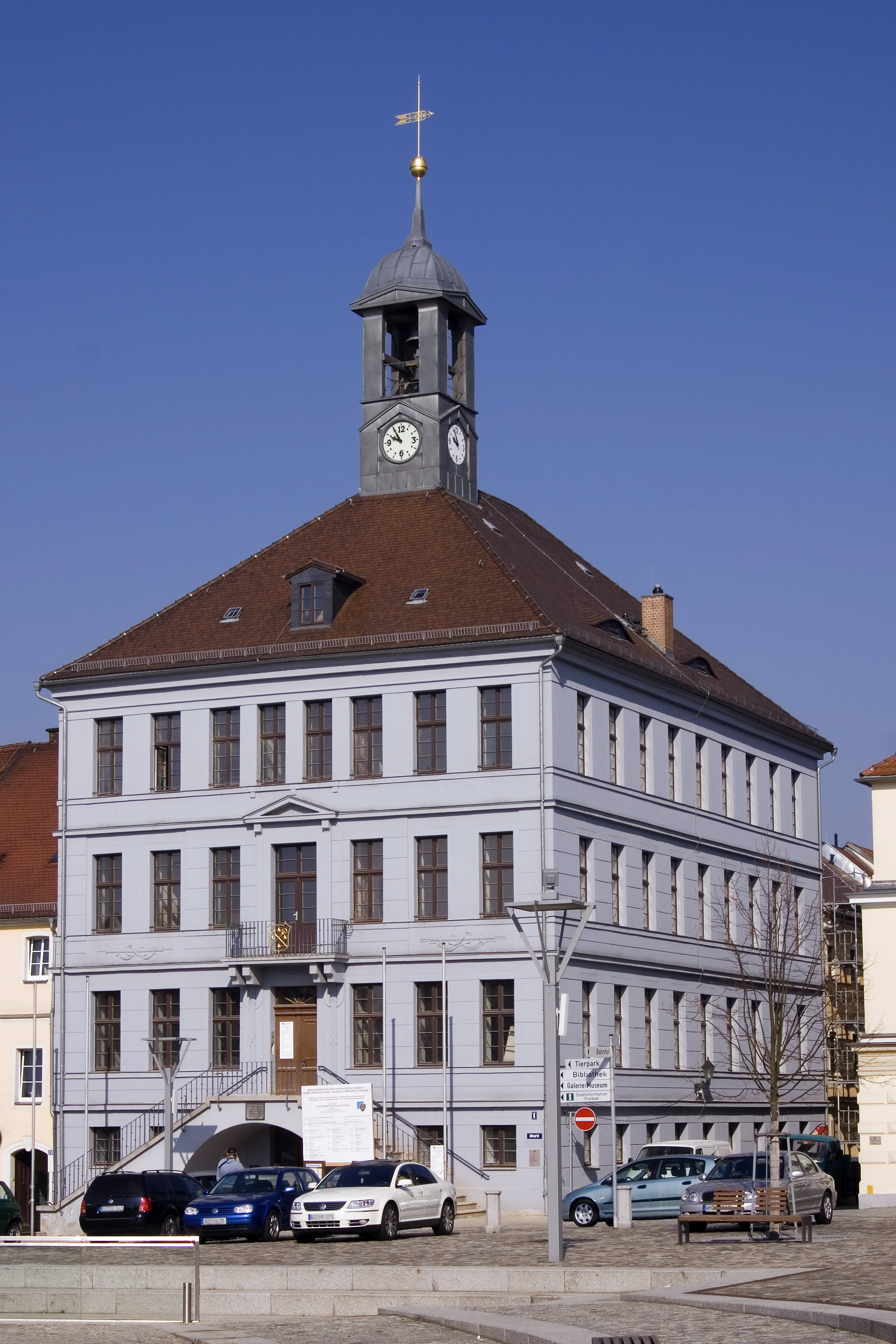
Town hall in Bischofswerda.

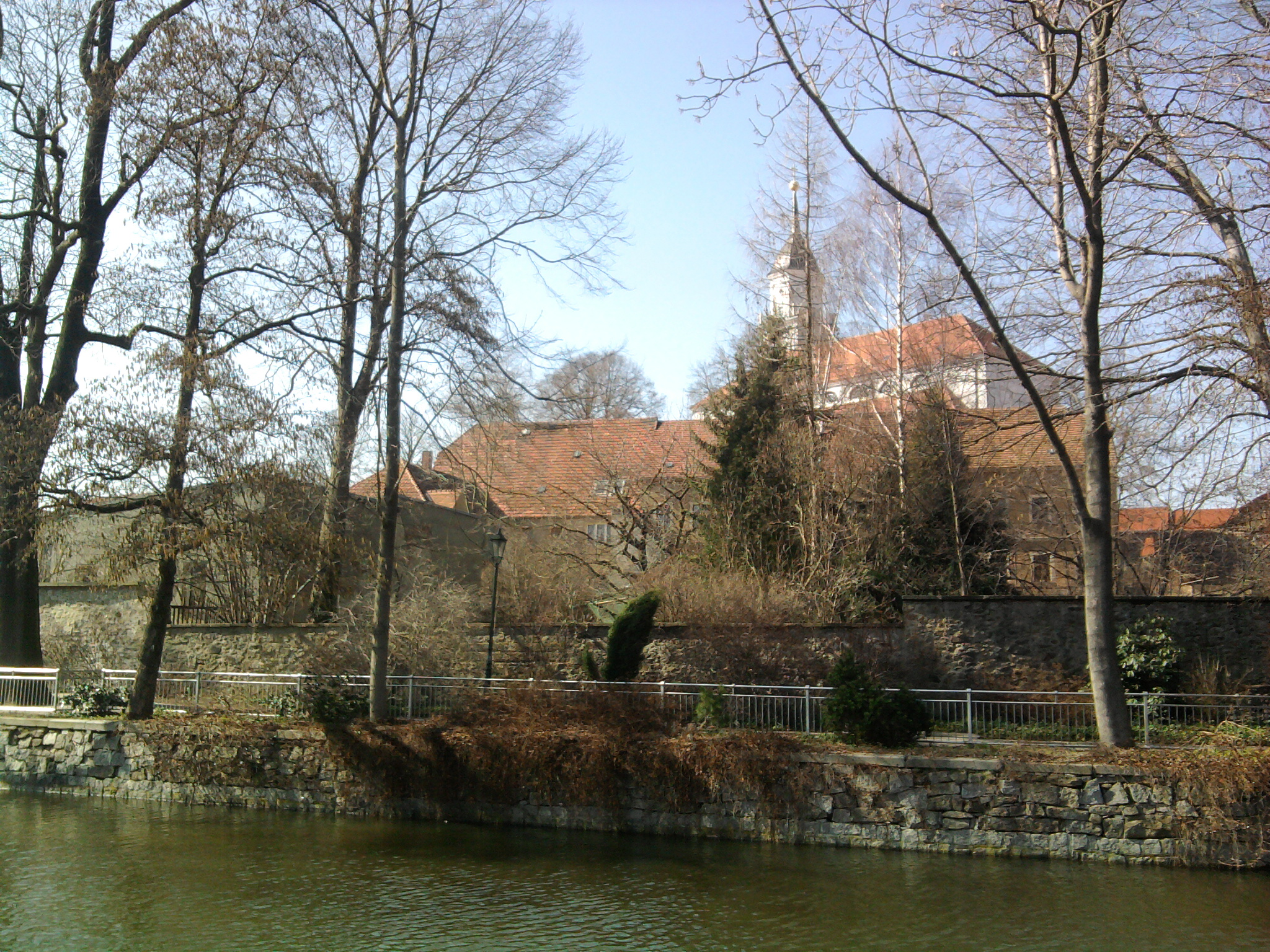
Church Christuskirche in Bischofswerda.

=== Reconstruction of Dresden ===
After the war, Thormeyer led the demolishing of the historical fortification in Dresden as architect in-chief. This reconstruction was finished in 1830, integrating the baroque city center with the surrounding and thus creating room for Dresden to grow rapidly during the following decades. In 1814, Russian governor Nikolai Grigorjewitsch Repnin Wolkonski ordered the long-planned outside-staircase to Brühl's Terrace, Thormeyer's best-known masterpiece. About 1823, Thormeyer accomplished the classicizing tower of the Annenkirche, a church of the late baroque era. Moreover, he initiated a memorial statue of Frederick Augustus I of Saxony, finally designed by Ernst Friedrich August Rietschel.

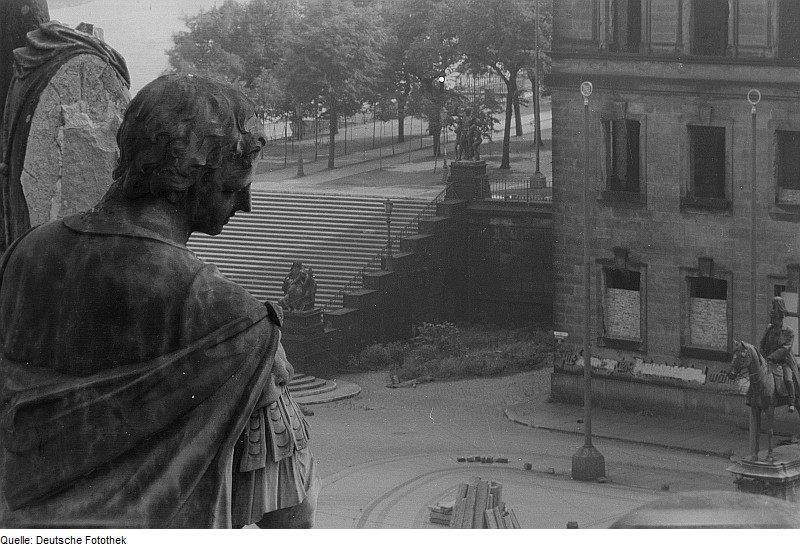
Outside-staircase to Brühl's Terrace.

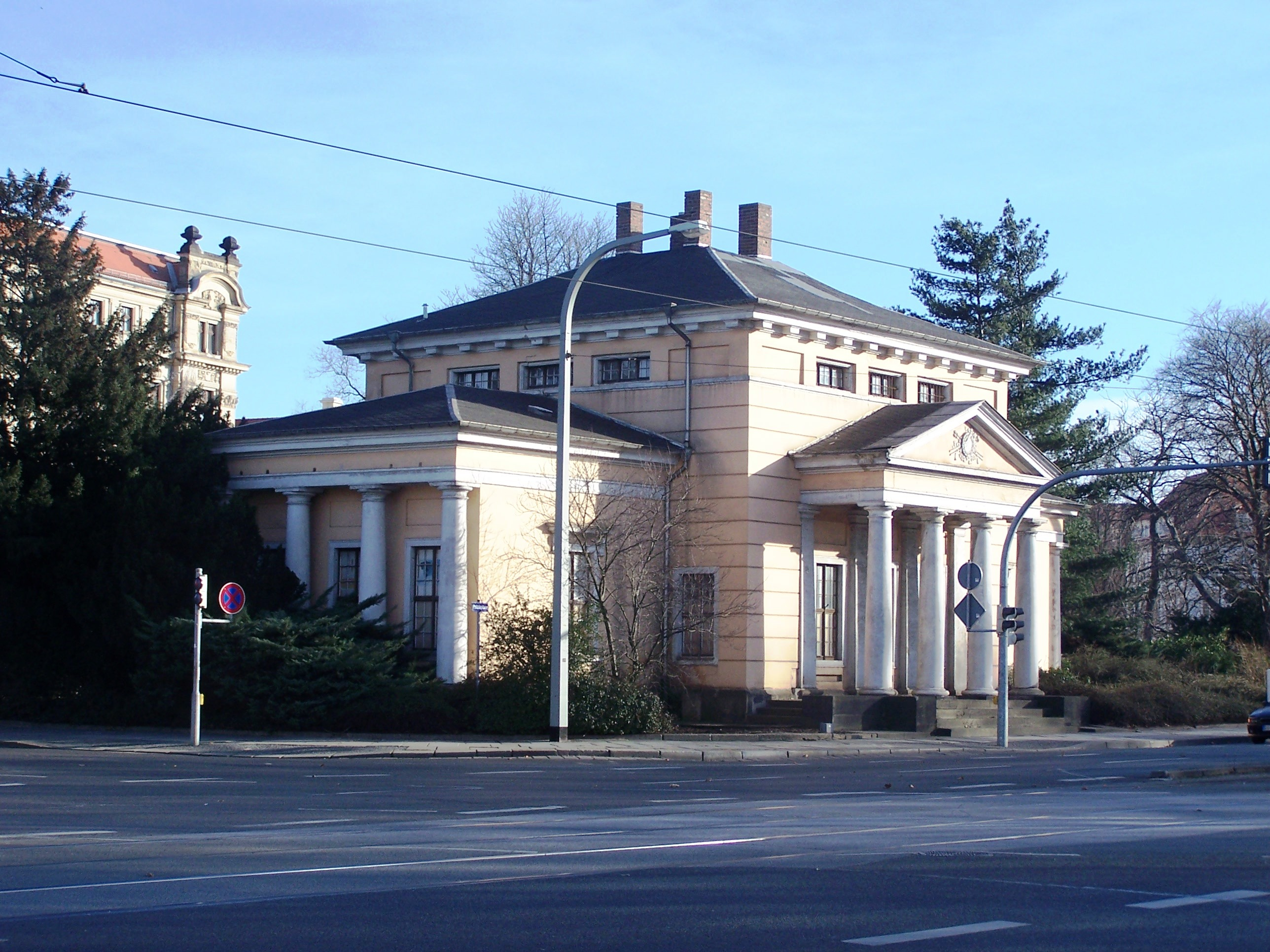
Palaisplatz Dresden.

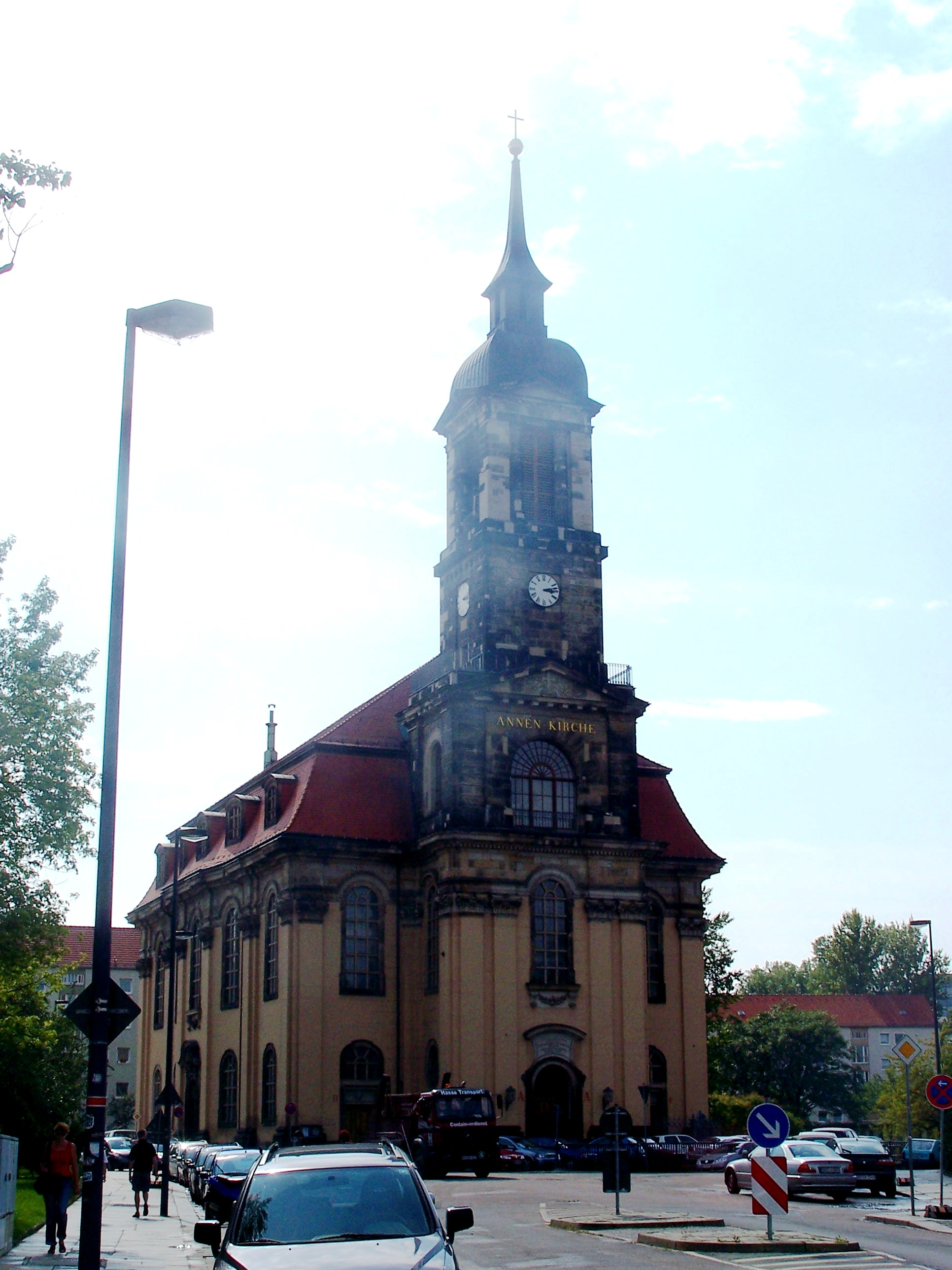
Tower of the church Annenkirche.
