= Kerstin Kartscher =

German artist (born 1966)

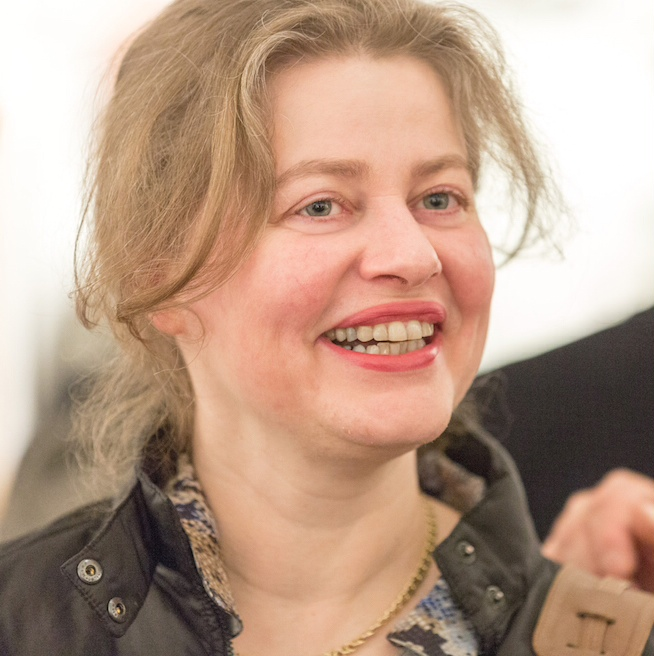
- Kerstin Kartscher in 2014
- Born: 1966 (age 59–60); Nuremberg, Germany
- Education: Academy of Fine Arts, Nuremberg (1987-1987); University of Fine Arts of Hamburg (1989–1994); MA in Fine Arts (1996)
- Known for: Drawing, Installation
- Awards: Overbeck Award (2005); Grant, City of Hamburg (1996) (Jahresstipendium der Stadt Hamburg); Project Grant, Neue Bildende Kunst Hamburg (1994)

Kerstin Kartscher is a German artist who lives and works in London. Her central medium is drawing. Often her works evolve out of combining finely detailed drawings with found objects, or man made materials, that can be merged in installations. Kartscher creates drawings and installations of imaginary worlds populated by nameless heroines who celebrate their femininity, liberated from social, emotional and psychological constraints, within fantastical, elegant and immense landscapes.

== Biography ==
Kerstin Kartscher studied art at the Academy of Fine Arts, Nuremberg from 1987 to 1987 and the University of Fine Arts of Hamburg from 1989 to 1994, where she received a master's degree in Fine Arts in 1996.

She was the third artist to participate in the Tate St Ives Artist Residency Programme based at Porthmeor Studios. During the residency, Kartscher evolved a new body of work, and created a central installation, Private War, and other fantastic landscapes in inks, marker pens, acrylic and collage that was exhibited at Tate St Ives in October 2005. Other residencies include the Bleckede Residency, City of Lueneburg in 2001 and the Residency, City of Vienna, 1999.

Kerstin Kartscher is represented by Karin Guenther Gallery, Hamburg and Studio Sales Gallery, Rome.

== Exhibitions ==
Kerstin Kartscher's work has been shown in solo and group exhibitions including Migros Museum of Contemporary Art, Zurich; Museum of Modern Art, New York; Art Sheffield 08; Kunstmuseum Liechtenstein, Vaduz; British Art Show 6; Hayward Gallery, London; Espace Electra, Paris; Overbeck-Gesellschaft, Lübeck; Sprengel Museum, Hannover; Kunsthalle Nürnberg; Kunsthalle Hamburg; Deichtorhallen Hamburg; Museum Haus Lange and Haus Esters, Krefeld; Kunstverein Hamburg (art association in Hamburg); Karin Guenther Gallery, Hamburg; Studio Sales Gallery; Giti Nourbakhsch Gallery, Berlin; Tanya Bonakdar Gallery, New York.

== Collections ==
Kerstin Kartscher's work is part of public collections, including Museum of Modern Art, New York; Kunstmuseum Liechtenstein, Vaduz; Migros Museum of Contemporary Art, Zurich; Kunsthalle Hamburg.

== Bibliography ==
Exhibition reviews and articles about Kartscher's work include

- The garden of forking paths, Migros Museum of Contemporary Art, Zurich, Exhibition Catalogue, 2011, pp 39–40 (by Heike Munder)
- Kerstin Kartscher by William Corwin, frieze magazine, Exhibition Review, Nov 2010
- Preklaere noblesse by Gunter Reski, Texte zur Kunst, Kofferleben, Daily, 643 Stunde, online 10/2010
- Other Worlds by Katharine Stout, Tate ETC magazine, Issue 11, Autumn 2007, p 77
- Kerstin Kartscher by Jörn Ebner, frieze magazine, Exhibition Review, Issue 104, Jan – Feb 2007, p 172
- self portrait, tema celeste, Issue 111, Sep – Oct 2005
- Vitamin D by Emma Dexter, Essay on Kerstin Kartscher by Dominic Eichler, Phaidon Press 2005, pp 158–159
- Kerstin Kartscher, Tate St Ives Exhibition Catalogue, 2005, Essays by Heike Munder and Jan Verwoert
- Fantastic Voyage by Dominic Eichler, frieze magazine, Issue 72, Jan – Feb 2003, pp 82–85
- Kerstin Kartscher at Galerie Giti Nourbakhsch, Berlin by Jennifer Allen, Artforum International, Exhibition Review, April 2002
- Somewhere over the rainbow by Esther Buss, Texte zur Kunst, Issue 45, March 2002, pp 119–121

== Other sources ==
- Kerstin Kartscher at MoMa
- Kerstin Kartscher at Tate St Ives Artist Residency Programme
- Kerstin Kartscher at Drawing Room
- Kerstin Kartscher on Artmap
- Kerstin Kartscher on Pinterest
