= Paul Wallot =

German architect

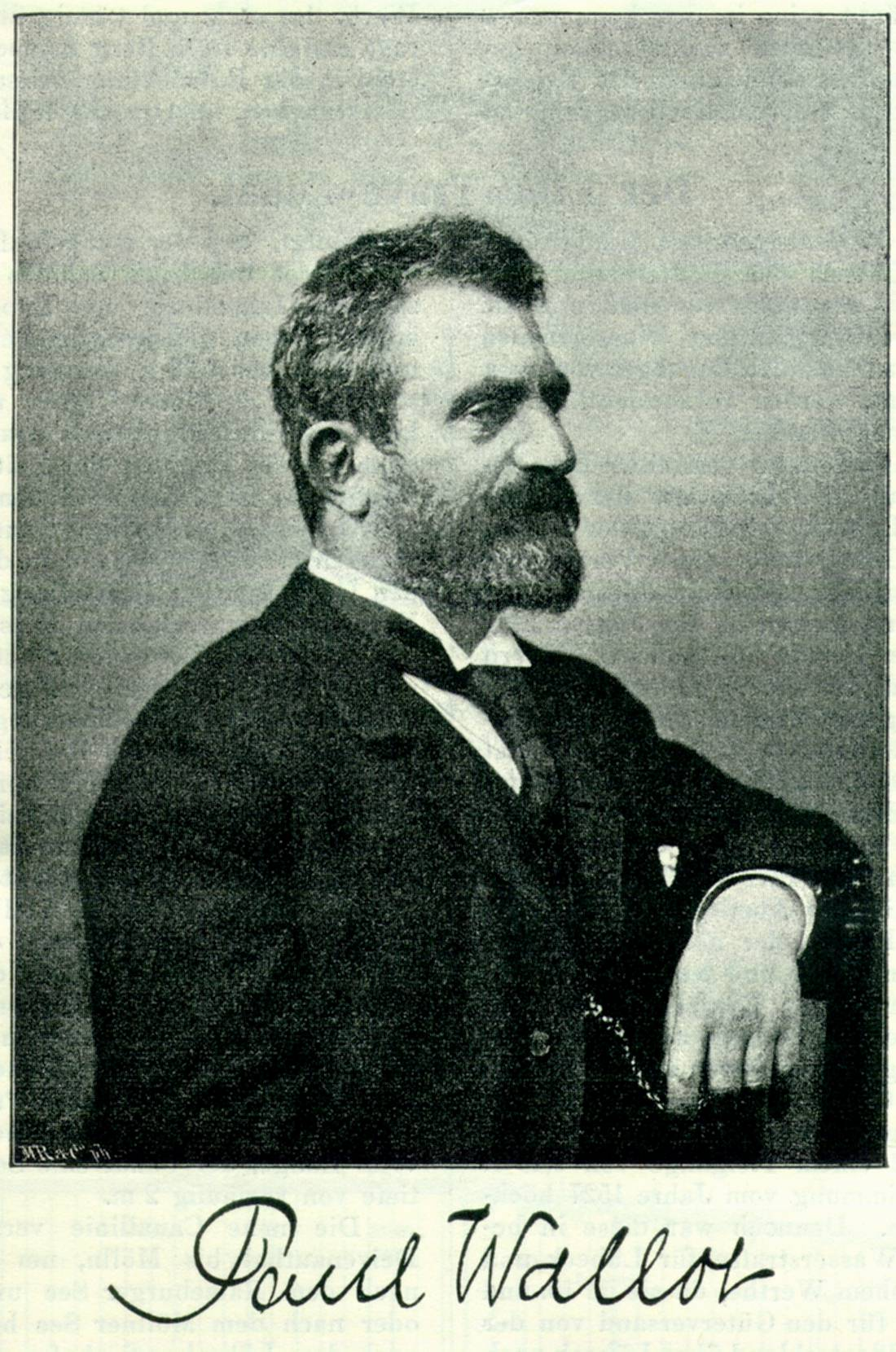
Paul Wallot, 1894

Johann Paul Wallot (26 June 1841 Oppenheim am Rhein – 10 August 1912 Bad Schwalbach) was a German architect, best known for designing the Reichstag building in Berlin, erected between 1884 and 1894. He also built the adjacent Palace of the President of the Reichstag, finished in 1904, and the former Saxon Ständehaus state diet building of 1906 at Brühl's Terrace in Dresden.

== Life ==
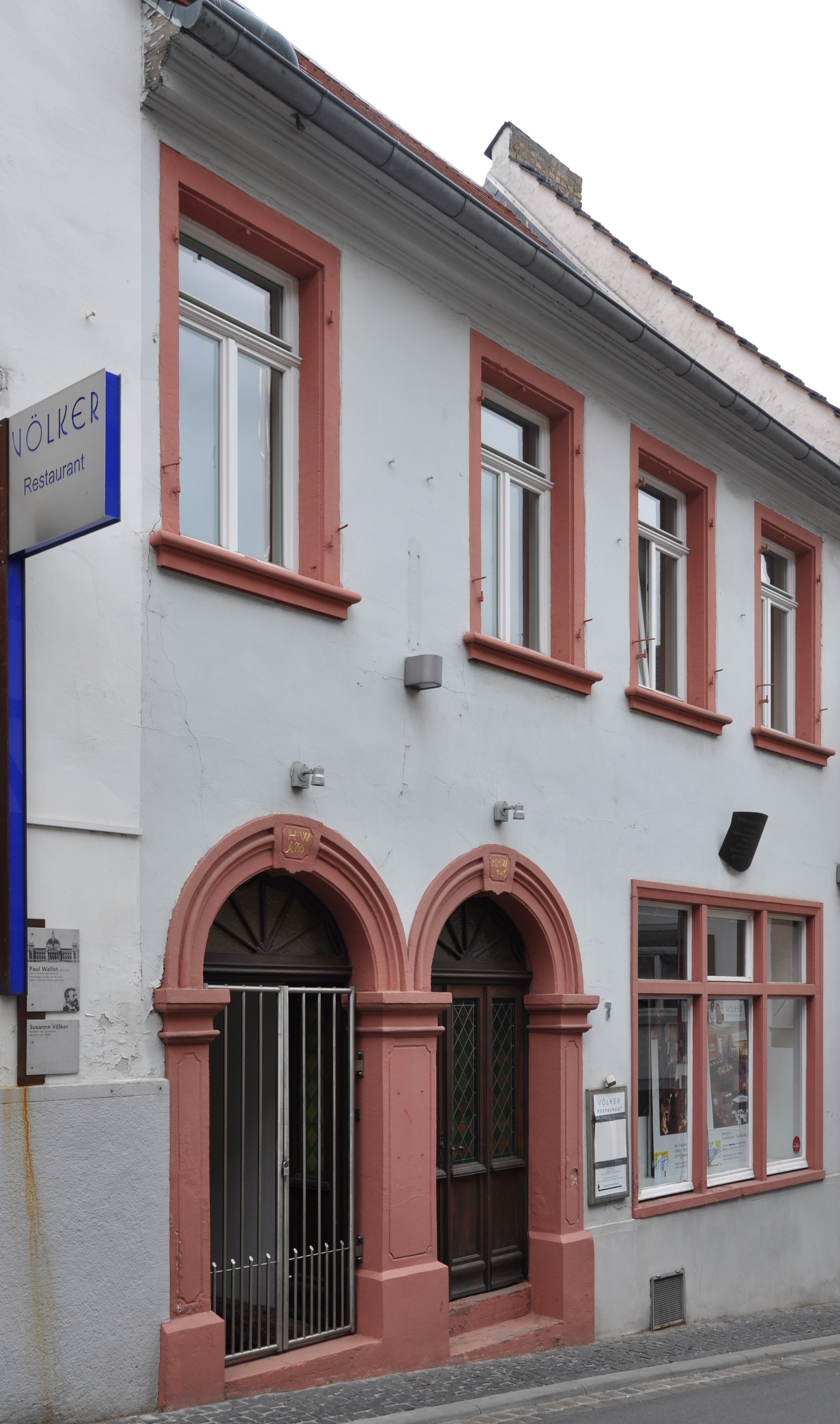
Wallot's birthplace in Oppenheim (Krämerstraße 7)

As a descendant of the Huguenot noble family Vallot, which originates in South of France, Paul Wallot was born on 26 June 1841 at Krämerstraße 7 in Oppenheim. In the years 1856 to 1859 he attended the Technische Universität Darmstadt. He then studied for a year at the Gottfried Wilhelm Leibniz Universität Hannover with Conrad Wilhelm Hase and moved to the Berlin Bauakademie in 1861. He graduated from University of Giessen with Hugo von Ritgen.

Following his studies, Wallot worked for a year as a 'Bauakzessist' in Hessen. Between the years 1864 and 1868 he worked again in Berlin with the architects Heinrich Strack, Richard Lucae and Friedrich Hitzig. Wallot was also able to sit in the common studio of the architects Martin Gropius and Heino Schmieden.

From 1867 to 1868, Wallot undertook extensive study trips through Italy and the Great Britain. In the year of his return, he settled in Frankfurt am Main as an independent architect. In this function, he was responsible for various private and commercial buildings and became a member of the Masonic lodge "Socrates to fortitude". In Frankfurt, he also worked with the architects Heinrich Burnitz and Alfred Friedrich Bluntschli.

In 1872, Wallot undertook a second study trip to Italy, where he became particularly interested in works by the architects Andrea Palladio and Michele Sanmicheli. After returning from this trip, he took part in various architectural competitions, such as, the Frankfurt Central Station in 1880 and the Niederwald Monument in 1883. However, his applications were not successful.

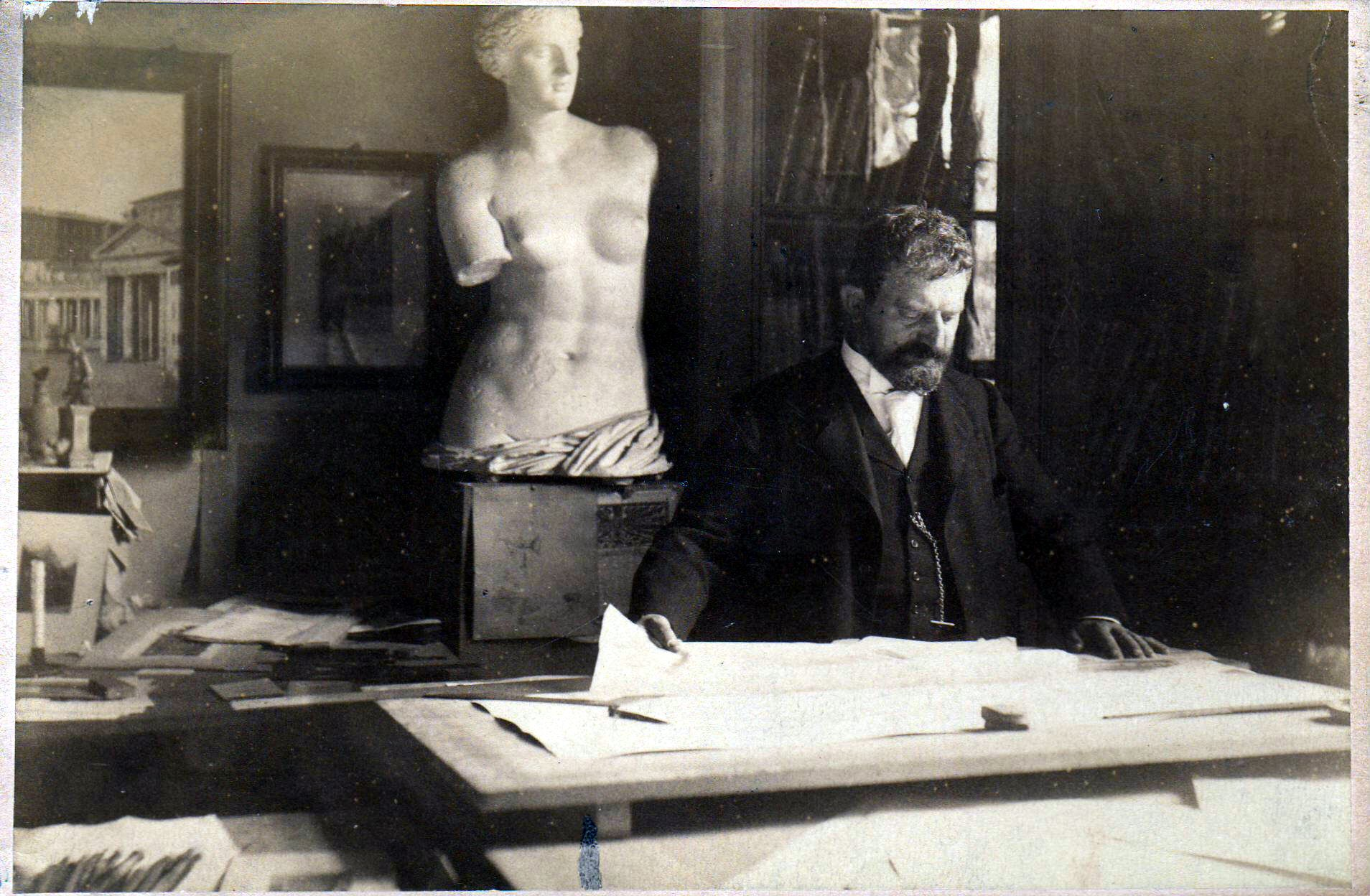
Wallot in his studio

Wallot made his breakthrough when he won the second competition for the Reichstag building in Berlin victorious in 1882. With his colleague Friedrich von Thiersch, Wallot shared the competition's first prize, but his design was almost unanimously voted by the jury. In 1883, Wallot settled in Berlin to better monitor the construction. On 9 June 1884, the foundation ceremony was celebrated, and ten years later, on 5 December 1894, the capstone was set solemnly. The glazed iron dome above an official building, such as the Reichstag building, was astonishing and can be described as progressive in view of the further developments in architecture. Nevertheless, the construction was highly controversial throughout its construction period. With its original height of 67 meters, the dome was higher than that of the Stadtschloss, Berlin. In the construction commission for the Reichstag building sat competitors who were inferior to him in the competition. Kaiser Wilhelm II called the Reichstag building Reichsaffenhaus (Reich monkey house), which, however, also referred to the democratic legal form of parliamentarism.

A key scene of the dispute between Wallot and Wilhelm II is a visit by Wilhelm II in Wallot's studio. During his visit, Wilhelm grabbed a pen, edited the floor plan of the Reichstag building only to then tell the eighteen-years older Wallot “My son, this is how we do it.” Wallot replied "Your Majesty, that will not work!" In addition, the building commission made several major changes to the building, since not only the wishes of the Prussian government but above all those of the German Kaiser Wilhelm I, Friedrich III. and Wilhelm II had to be considered.

In 1889, Wallot had already thought about the interior design and contracted the painter Franz von Stuck (two monumental ceiling paintings) and the sculptor Adolf von Hildebrand (two ballot boxes). When the drafts were presented on in the Reichstag on 1 March 1889 and were to be voted on, there were tumultuous scenes. The spokesman of the critics was the Philipp Ernst Maria Lieber of the Center Party from Bad Camberg. The rejection was so great that Wallot resigned the same day as head of the Decoration Commission. Thereupon Lieber was accepted in this commission. The designs of the paintings and the urns have disappeared from this day.

Probably since Wallot had rejected in 1889 a change request Wilhelm II, the relationship between the two was disturbed. The emperor refused the architect, despite different recommendations, several awards. In 1894, Wallot received only the small gold medal, not the Roter Adlerorden, but only the title of Geheimer Baurat instead of the great gold medal of the Große Berliner Kunstausstellung he was awarded in 1894 for his services to the Reichstag. At the same time he accepted teaching assignments at the Dresden Academy of Fine Arts and at Dresden University of Technology, which he held until 1911. In Dresden, the new building of the Saxonian Estates Houses on the Brühlsche Terrasse was also transferred to him. Oswin Hempel, Karl Paul Andrae and Wilhelm Fränkel were some of his disciples.

From Dresden, he also directed from 1897 to 1907 the establishment of the presidential building of the Reichstag. In the years 1898 and 1899, Paul Wallot led the competition for the construction of Bismarck monuments in the German Reich, which had proclaimed the German Student Union. In 1911 he resigned all offices and retired. He retired to his retirement home in Biebrich on the Rhine. During a stay at the spa, Paul Wallot died at the age of 71 on August 10, 1912, in Langenschwalbach, today the county seat of the Rheingau-Taunus-Kreis Bad Schwalbach. His burial took place in the family grave in Oppenheim, which was designed by Alfred Friedrich Bluntschli.

== Awards and honors ==
- Already in 1894, his hometown Oppenheim honored him with its honorary citizenship.
- In 1898, the newly built Wallotstraße in Berlin-Grunewald received its name.
- In 1908, a street of the Essen Moltkeviertel was named after him.
- In 1911, he became an honorary doctor of the Technische Universität Dresden.
- In 1926, the former Ludwig Richter street in Dresden was named after him.
- In 1991, on the occasion of his 150th birthday, the German Federal Post Office issued a special stamp.

== Achievements ==
=== Buildings (selection) ===
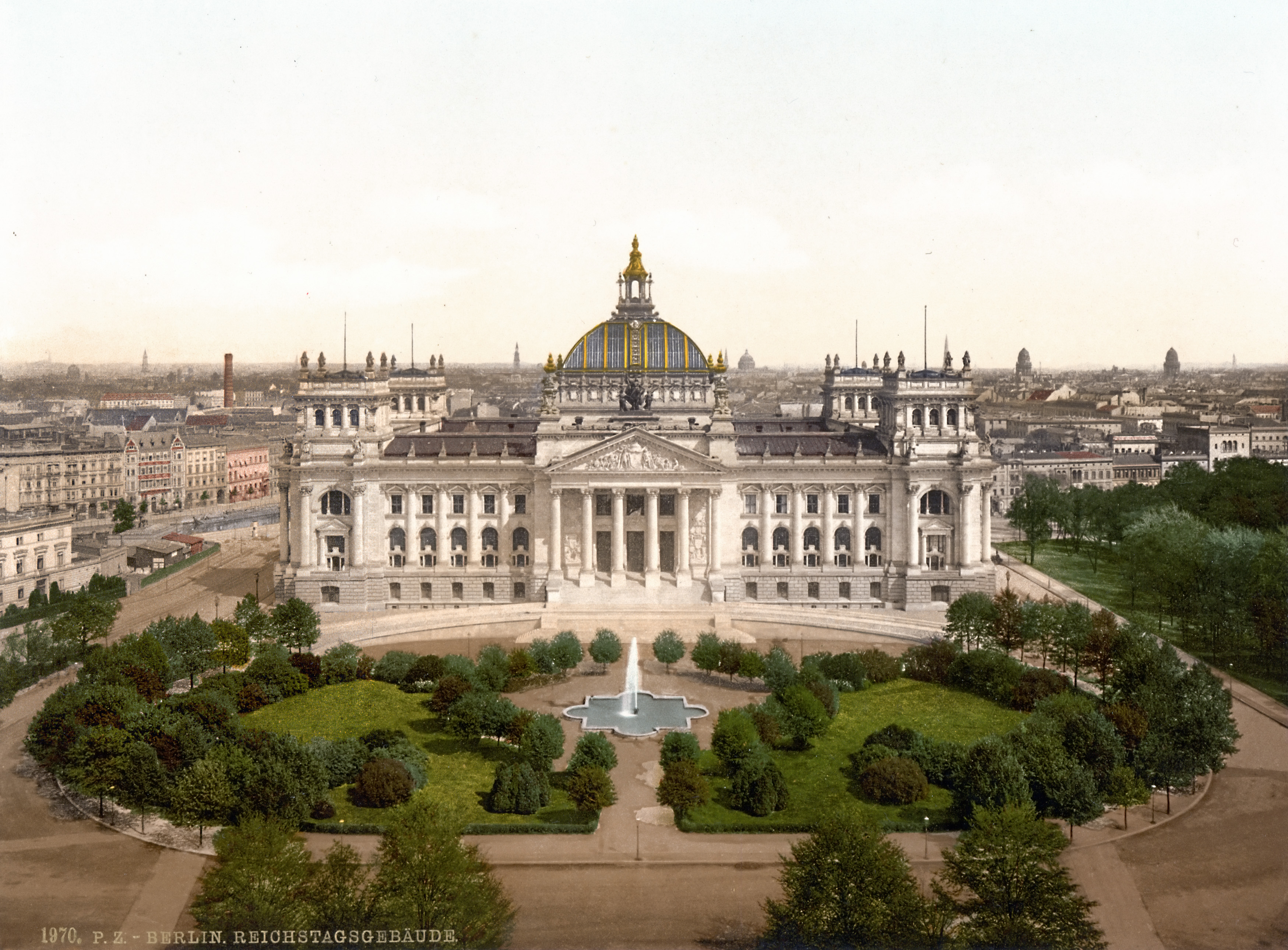
Reichstag building at the end of the 19th century, View from the Siegessäule

- 1875: Residential and commercial building in Frankfurt am Main, Kaiserstraße 25 / Neue Mainzer Straße 26, for the Frankfurt banker Carl Müller
- 1878: Residential and commercial building in Frankfurt am Main, Kaiserstraße 10 / 10a
- 1881: Residential building for the print shop owner E. R. Osterrieth in Frankfurt am Main, Gutleutstraße 89
- 1884–1918: Reichstag building in Berlin-Tiergarten
- 1894: Chapel on the Johannis cemetery in Dresden-Tolkewitz, Wehlener Straße
- 1897–1904: Reichstag Presidential Palace in Berlin-Tiergarten, opposite the Reichstag building (today seat of the German Parliamentary Society)
- 1899: Residential building for the Hessian chancellor Gustav Römheld in Darmstadt, Mathildenhöhe, Alexandraweg 14
- before 1900: Residential and commercial building Neidlinger in Frankfurt am Main, Zeil
- 1901–1906: Saxon State Parliament, so-called Ständehaus, in Dresden, on the Brühlsche Terrasse

=== Scripts ===
- Maximilian Rapsilber: Das Reichstags-Gebäude. Seine Baugeschichte und künstlerische Gestaltung sowie ein Lebensabriss seines Erbauers Paul Wallot. Cosmos, Leipzig 1895.

== Literature ==
=== Essays ===
- Susanne Bräckelmann: Auf den Spuren von Paul Wallot. In: Heimatjahrbuch 2010 Landkreis Mainz-Bingen, ISSN 0171-8304, S. 181–184.
- Susanne Bräckelmann: Ein berühmter Unbekannter. Der Oppenheimer Paul Wallot (1841–1912) – Architekt des Reichstags in Berlin. In: Oppenheimer Hefte 37/2009, S. 35–63, ISBN 978-3-87854-223-0.
- Tilmann Buddensieg: Die Kuppel des Volkes. Zur Kontroverse um die Kuppel des Berliner Reichstages. In: Derselbe: Berliner Labyrinth. Preußische Raster. Wagenbach, Berlin 1992, ISBN 3-8031-5143-0, S. 74–82.
- Tilmann Buddensieg: Paul Wallots Reichstag. Rätsel und Antworten seiner Formensprache. In: Derselbe: Berliner Labyrinth, neu besichtigt. Von Schinkels „Unter den Linden“ bis zu Fosters Reichstagskuppel. Wagenbach, Berlin 1999, ISBN 3-8031-2345-3, S. 85–97.
- Gerald Kolditz: Wallot, Johann Paul. In: Sächsische Biografie
- Alexander Kropp: 100. Todestag des Reichsarchitekten Paul Wallot am 12. August 2012. In: Wissenschaftliche Dienste des Deutschen Bundestags, Nr. 21/12 (09. August 2012).
- Peter Wolff: Paul Wallot. Der Architekt des Berliner Reichstagsgebäudes und sein Tod im Untertaunus. In: Jahrbuch 2009 des Rheingau-Taunus-Kreises, Bd. 60 (2008), S. 133–134, ISSN 1439-0779.

=== Film ===
- Dem Deutschen Volke. Paul Wallot, Architekt des Reichstags. Documentary, Germany, 2016, 29:35, Book and Director: Ute Kastenholz, Production: SWR, Series: Bekannt im Land, First broadcast: 5 June 2016 on SWR Fernsehen, Synopsis on ARD.
