= Dresden City Museum =

Museum in Dresden, Germany

Coordinates: 51°03′00″N 13°44′35″E

- Stadtmuseum Dreden
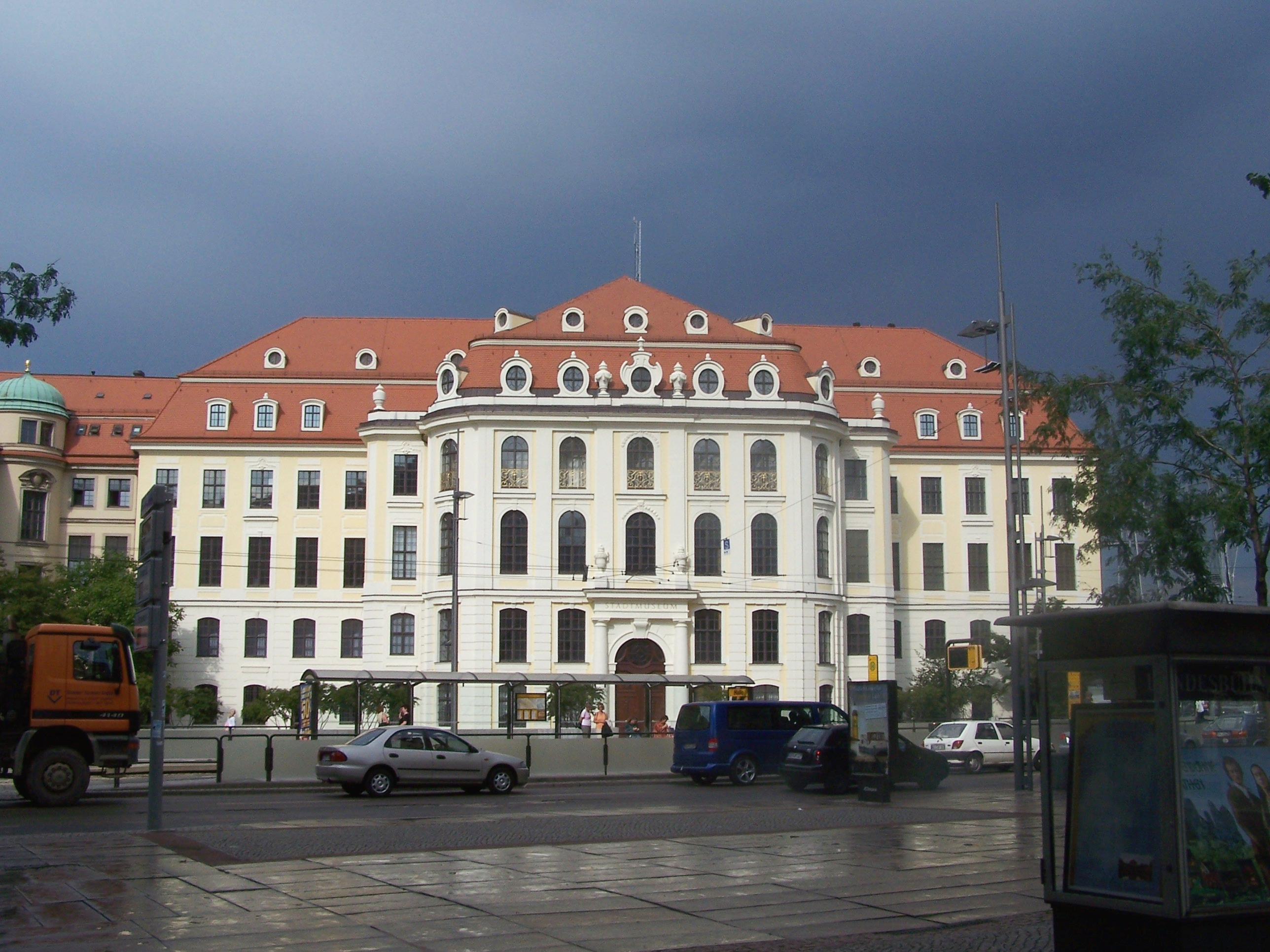
- The Landhaus Dresden, in which the Dresden City Museum is based.
- Established: 2005
- Location: Dresden, Saxony
- Director: Gisbert Porstmann
- Owner: City of Dresden
- Website: Official website

Dresden City Museum (German: Stadtmuseum Dresden) is the central city museum for the German city of Dresden. Its displays tell the 800-year story of the city and is the largest and most important of the Dresden City Museums (Städtischen Museen Dresden). Its art collections split off in 2000 to form the Dresden City Art Gallery, but both the Art Gallery and the Museum are housed in Dresden's Landhaus.

== Building and surroundings ==
The Landhaus houses the Dresden City Museum. It was built between 1770 and 1776 and designed by Friedrich August Krubsacius using a mixture of baroque, rococo and classical elements. It was the seat of the Landtag of Saxony (Parliament of Saxony) from 1832 to 1907, when the Landtag was moved to the Ständehaus.

The Landhaus is at edge of the Innere Altstadt between Wildstruffer and Landhaus streets, and between the Neumarkt and Pirnaischer Platz. The Polizeipräsidium and the Police Museum is next door. The Frauenkirche (Church of Our Lady) and the Kurländer Palace are also nearby. The Dresden Fortress Museum and the Albertinum are also nearby.

== Galleries ==
The museum's permanent exhibition covers various aspects of Dresden's history, including its cultural and business history. More than 1000 exhibits are on display in four rooms. The exhibitions cover more than 1800 square metres over several floors. Twenty media stations also provide information about Dresden's development over the last 800 years. Various educational activities are also on offer. Three models of the city, the oldest city seal dating from 1309, busts from the Busmannkapelle and documents and objects from the destruction of the city by the 1945 Anglo-American bombing of Dresden in World War II are amongst the exhibits on show. The exhibition also covers for example the history of the Dresden Fire Department with a baroque and hand-driven fire pump dating from 1759. Visitors can also walk on a 10x6 metre aerial photo of the city and look at a 2x 1,5 metre relief model of the Dresden Elbe Valley. The building's ballroom is used for lectures and other events.

== Collections ==
Besides the exhibits on display, the museum also houses a research collection which is the basis for the museum as a place of research. The collection is extensive and includes objects related to culture, history, and daily life in the city.

The collection of photographs and postcards contains around 200,000 objects. The emphasis is on views of the city, historical events, portraits of Dresden personalities and the work of Dresden photographers (that of August Kotzsch, amongst others). The collection includes daguerreotypes, tintypes and other photographs taken using old techniques, as well as complete collections of collectors who have died. Of particular note are more than 1000 photographs of the city and its personalities dating from the mid-19th century to around 1930.

The object collection includes around 30,000 objects in 29 groups. These include objects relating to interior decoration, household management, clothes, militaria, musical instruments, toys, medals and coins, machines, instruments and applied arts.

The collection also includes partially preserved reliefs of the Nosseni epitaph.

== See also ==
- Nosseni epitaph
