= Bruel (disambiguation) =

Bruel may refer to:

== Family ==
- Brüel (family), a branch of the German noble family von Brühl

== Places ==
- Brüel, town in the Ludwigslust-Parchim district, in Mecklenburg-Western Pomerania, Germany

== People ==
- Birgit Brüel (1927–1996), Danish singer and actress
- Joachim Bruel (Brulius), theologian and historian, born early in the seventeenth century
- Kaya Brüel (born 1972), Danish singer and actress
- Max Brüel (1927–1995), Danish architect and jazz musician, an accomplished pianist and saxophonist
- Nick Bruel, American author and illustrator of children's books, most notably the Bad Kitty series
- Patrick Bruel, (born 1959), French singer, actor, and professional poker

== Business ==
- Brüel & Kjær, Danish multinational engineering and electronics company
