= Brühl (surname) =

Brühl or Bruhl is a surname. Notable people with the surname include:

- Alois Friedrich von Brühl (1739–1793), Polish-Saxon diplomat, politician, soldier, actor and playwright
- Carl Brühl (1820–1899), Austrian physician and anatomist
- Carl von Brühl (1772–1837), German theater manager
- Carlrichard Brühl (1925–1997), German historian of medieval history and philatelist
- Daniel Brühl (b. 1978), German actor
- Friedrich-August Graf von Brühl (1913–1981), German Major in the Wehrmacht, Oberstleutnant in the Bundeswehr
- Gabriel Brühl (died 1743), robber in the then Duchy of Limburg
- Gustav Brühl (1871–1939), German otorhinolaryngologist
- Gustav Brühl (author) (1826–1903), United States physician, poet and archaeologist
- Hans Moritz von Brühl (1736–1809), German diplomat and astronomer also known as John Maurice, Count of Brühl
- Hedwig Jenny Fechheimer née Brühl (1871–1942), German Egyptologist, art historian and Nazi holocaust victim
- Heidi Brühl (1942–1991), German singer and actress
- Heinrich von Brühl (1700–1763), German statesman
- Helmut Müller-Brühl (1933–2012), German conductor
- Jeremy James Bruhl (b. 1956), Australian botanist
- Lucien Lévy-Bruhl (1857–1939), French scholar
- Louis Burleigh Bruhl (1861–1942), English landscape artist
- Marie von Brühl (1739–1836), wife and assistant to Carl von Clausewitz
- Paul Johannes Brühl (1855–1935), botanist
