= Bril (disambiguation) =

Bril may refer to:

- Bril, a surname
- Bril (unit), an old and deprecated photometric unit of luminance

== See also ==
- Brill (disambiguation)
- Brühl (disambiguation)
- Brüll, a surname
