= Brühl family =

German noble family

Brühl
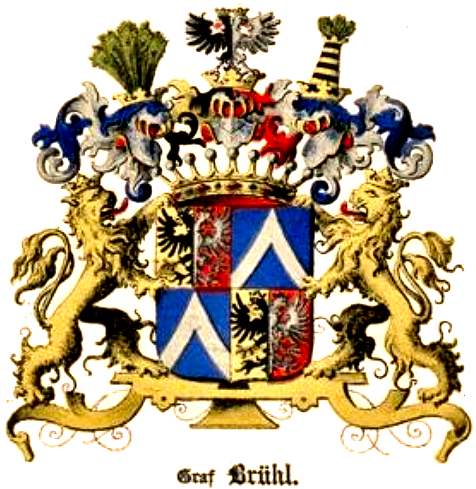
- Arms of the Counts of Brühl
- Current region: Germany, United States, Sweden, Denmark, France, United Kingdom
- Origin: Saxony, Holy Roman Empire
- Distinctions: Imperial Count of the Holy Roman Empire

The Brühl family (de Brüel, von Brühl) is an old German noble family from Saxony-Thuringia, with their ancestral seat in Gangloffsömmern in Thuringia. Branches of the family still exist today.

Heinrich von Brühl, who indirectly controlled Saxony and the Polish–Lithuanian Commonwealth during the 18th century, was a powerful statesman in the Holy Roman Empire.

One of the most important branches of the Brühl family uses the spelling Brüel or Bryll and mainly resides in Denmark, Sweden, Poland, and United States.

== History ==
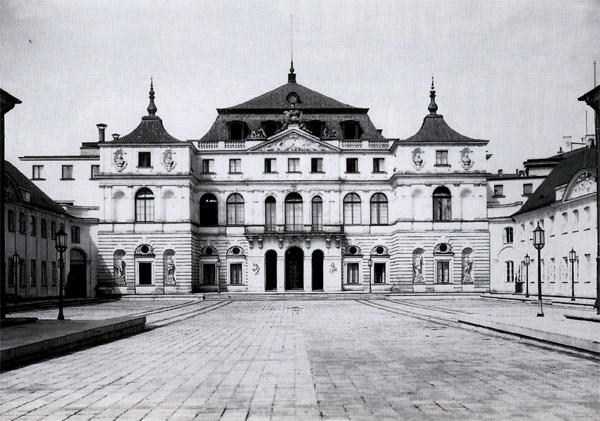
Brühl Palace, Warsaw

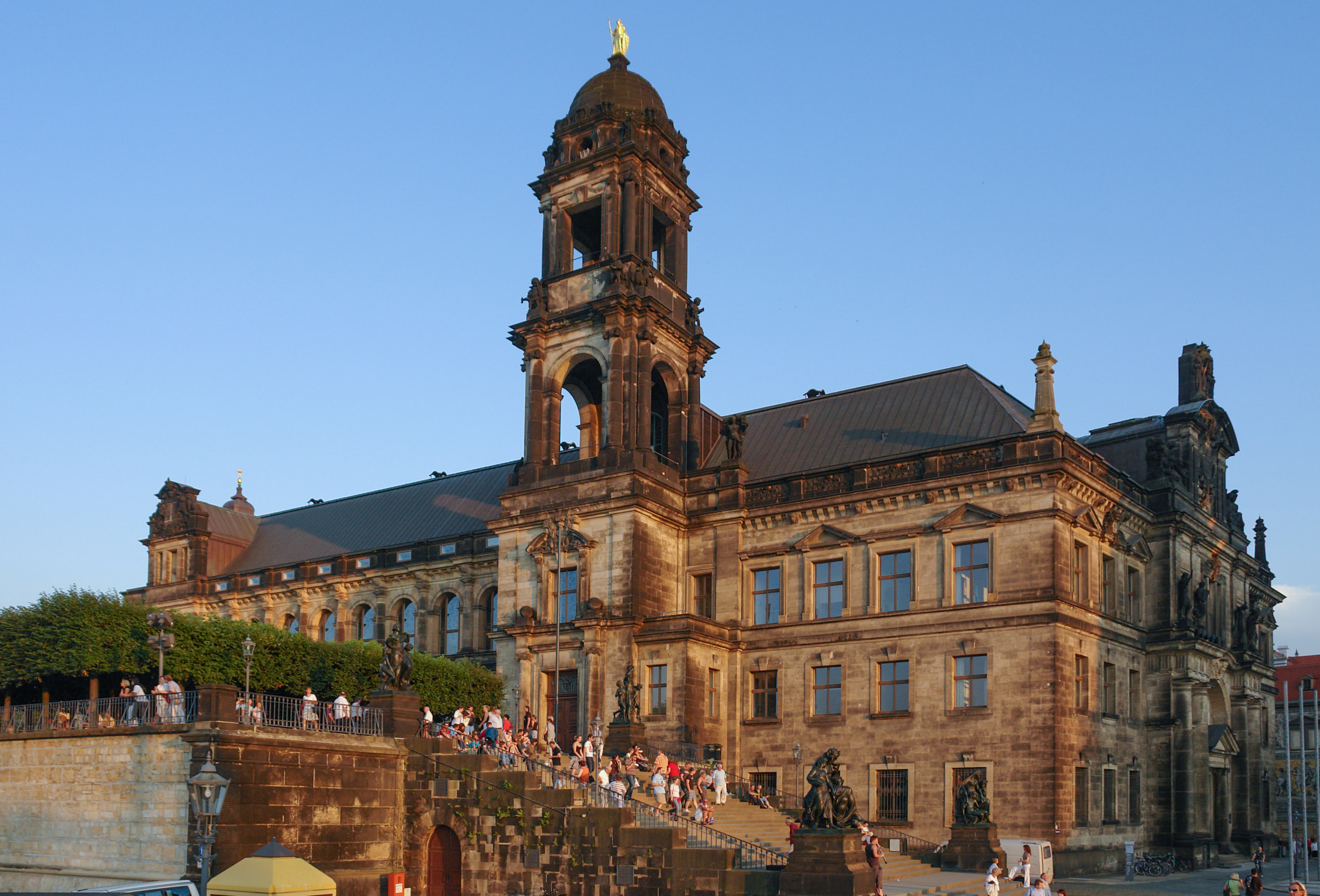
Brühl's Stairs and Ständehaus

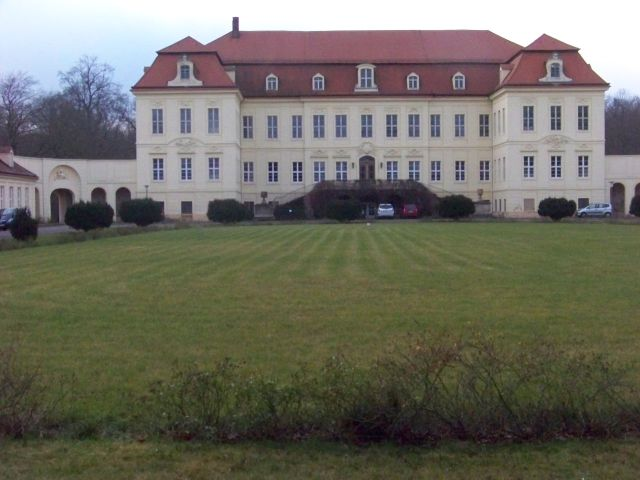
Brühl Estate in Nischwitz

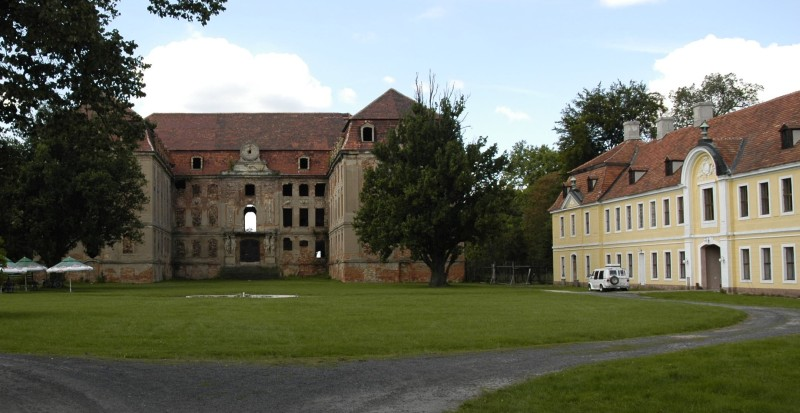
Brühl Estate in Brody

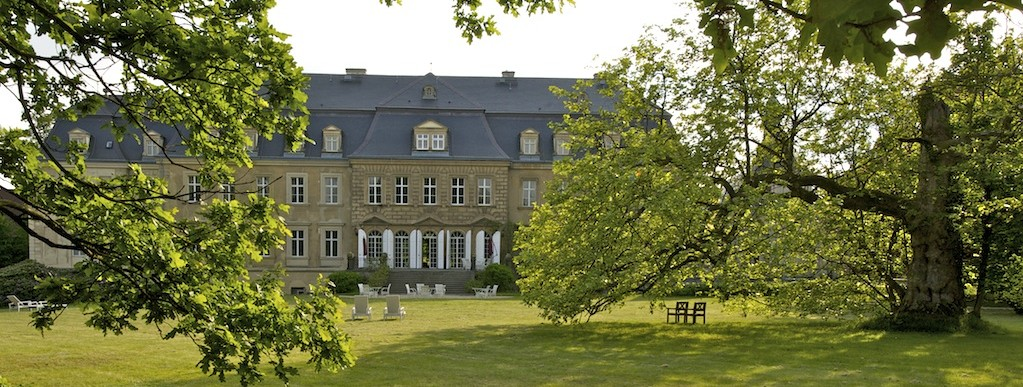
Brühl Estate, Castle Gaussig, view from the park

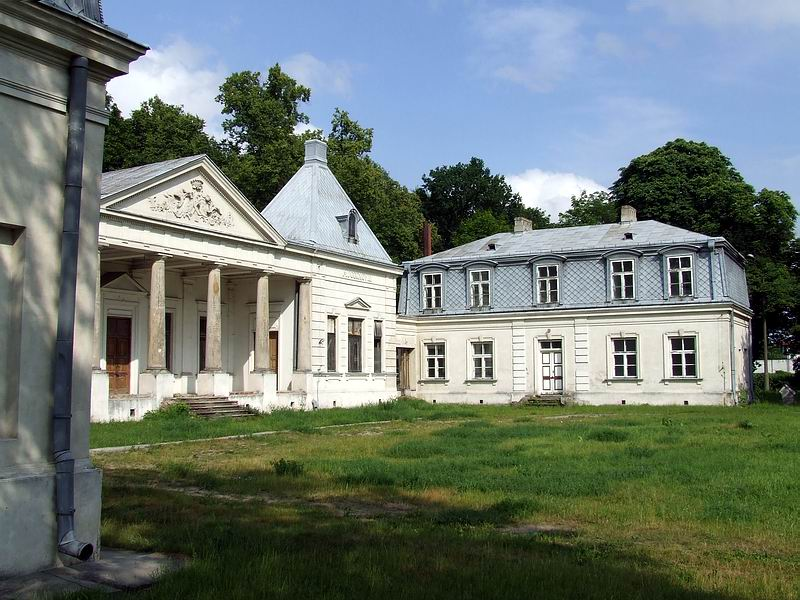
Brühl Estate, Warsaw

Not much is known about the family's early history. They are first mentioned in 1344, with "Heinrich aus dem Brühl". He is named as a ministerialis of the Counts of Hohnstein. The name Heinrich was later often given to sons of the family.

Heinrich von Brühl (died 1446) owned the manor of Wenigen-Tennstedt and is first mentioned in records in 1424. The familial line starts with him. His descendant Heinrich von Brühl acquired a manor at Gangloffsömmern in 1470, which became the family seat.

In 1464, the manor of Pakosław (Greater Poland) was bought by one Johannes Brühl (senior), whose son Johannes Brühl (junior) left Poland for Saxony in 1496 with his wife Balice Banarowna, heiress of Oświęcim, accompanying the king's daughter, Barbara Jagiellon (later the wife of George, Duke of Saxony). The name Brühl-Oswiecino was still in use into the 18th century.

At the end of the 17th century, the family seat was owned by the Oberhofmarschall and Wirklicher Geheimer Rat Hans Moritz von Brühl. His son was the Heinrich von Brühl (1700–1763). From 1719, he served the court of the Elector of Saxony, and he progressed quickly through the favour of Augustus II the Strong. For almost two decades, Brühl was the most powerful man in the Electorate; as prime minister, he indirectly controlled Saxony and the Polish–Lithuanian Commonwealth. His fiscal policy, unchecked by a weak ruler, almost led Saxony to financial disaster, but it made Brühl extremely wealthy. Like his three older brothers a year later, Heinrich von Brühl was made an Imperial Count in 1737.

The two youngest of the four brothers founded two lines, the older Saxonian line, starting with the Saxonian Landeshauptmann Friedrich Wilhelm von Brühl, and a younger Saxonian-Prussian line, starting with prime minister Heinrich von Brühl. The older line retained possession of Gangloffsömmern, Forst, and Seifersdorf. An offshoot started to use the name Brühl-Renard in 1909, but it died out in the male line in 1923. The family today has many branches.

=== United Kingdom ===
Hans Moritz von Brühl (1736–1809) was the son of F. W. Graf von Brühl of Martinskirchen, who died in 1760, and nephew of Heinrich von Brühl. Born at Wiederau in the Electorate of Saxony, he studied at Leipzig and there formed a close friendship with Christian Gellert, who corresponded with him for some years. At Paris in 1755, Brühl, then in his nineteenth year, took an active part in Saxon diplomacy, and he was summoned to Warsaw in 1759. He was named, through his uncle's influence, chamberlain and commandant in Thuringia, and in 1764 appointed ambassador extraordinary to the Court of St James's.

He loved astronomy and promoted its interests. Brühl helped determine, in 1785, the latitudes and longitudes of Brussels, Frankfurt, Dresden, and Paris. Brühl built (probably in 1787) a small observatory at his villa at Harefield and set up there, about 1794, a two-foot astronomical circle by Jesse Ramsden, one of the first instruments of the kind made in England. He was intimate with William Herschel, and transmitted news of discoveries abroad through Johann Elert Bode's Jahrbuch. He supported the advancement of chronometry, in the work of Thomas Mudge and Emery. He also gave attention to political economy, and made a tour through the remoter parts of England early in 1783 to investigate the state of trade and agriculture. "Count de Bruhl" was next to Philidor, Verdoni and George Atwood one of the greatest chess player of his time.

He married, first, in 1767, Alicia Maria, dowager countess of Egremont, daughter of George Carpenter, 2nd Baron Carpenter, who died on 1 June 1794, leaving him a son and daughter; secondly, in 1796, Maria, daughter of General Christopher Chowne, who died in 1835. The family was thus joined with the British aristocracy and intellectual elite, and offspring went on to possess significant influence in the United Kingdom. For example, Lord Polwarth was Brühl's grandson.

=== Scandinavia ===
Georg Wilhelm de Brüel (von Brühl) was sent to Denmark in the late 18th century to establish an operational plan of the forests in the stock houses Krenkerup on Lolland. Brüel was greatly successful, creating a close relationship with the Danish king, and started spelling his name "Brüel".

== Wealth ==
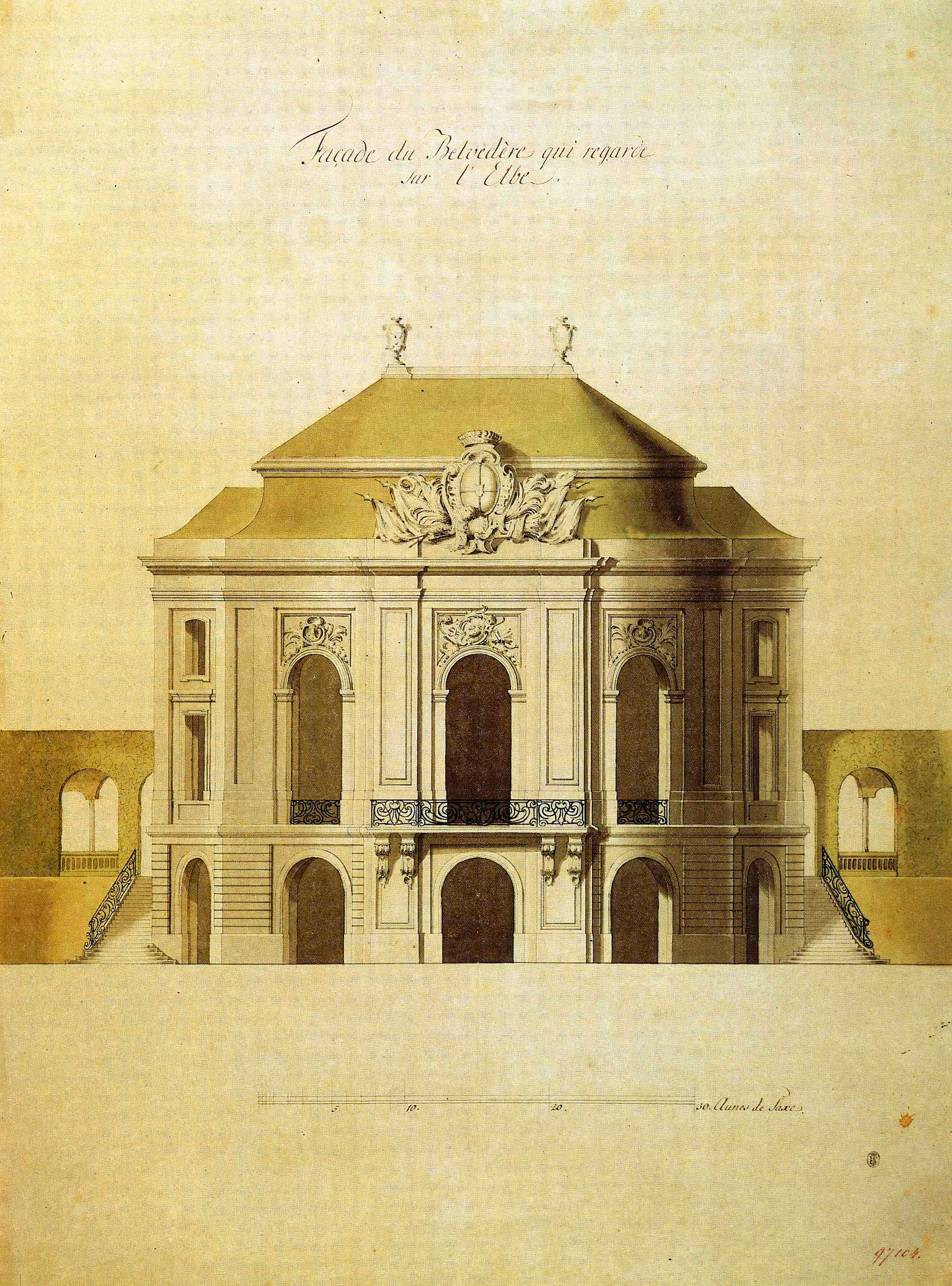
Second Belvedere

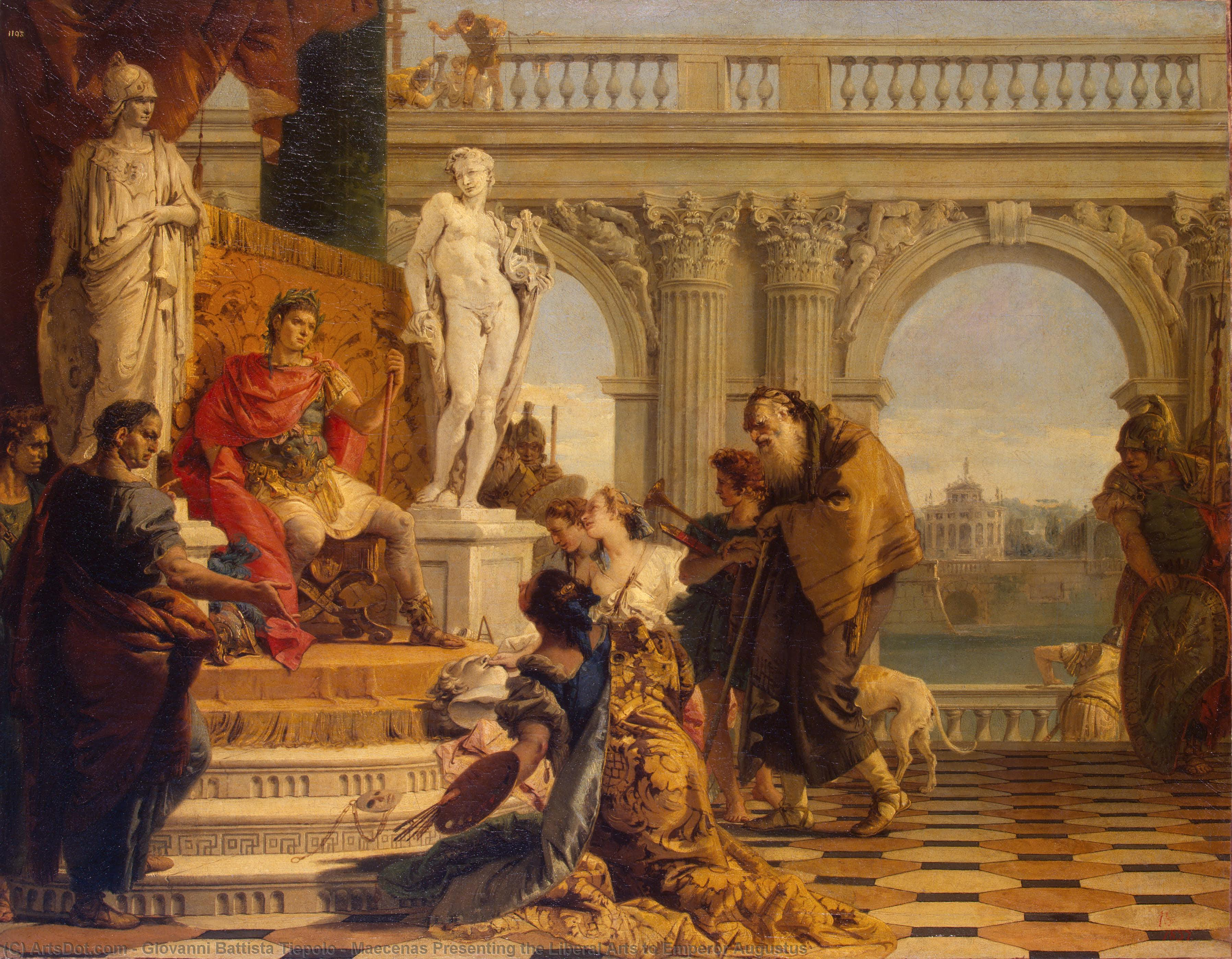
Giovanni Battista Tiepolo, Maecenas Presenting the Liberal Arts to Augustus from the Brühl collection.

The family accumulated remarkable wealth during the different reigns of their members, especially during the era of Heinrich von Brühl, whose fortune was sequestered but afterwards restored to the family. The inquiry showed that Brühl owed his immense fortune to the prodigality of the king rather than to unlawful means of accumulation.

== Art and architecture ==
The family's power was often beneficial to the arts and sciences. The family was a dedicated collector and protector of the arts. They owned a large gallery of pictures, which was bought by Empress Catherine II of Russia in 1768, and their library of 70,000 volumes was one of the biggest private libraries in the Holy Roman Empire.

Brühl's glories refers to the buildings and collections, created on behalf of Heinrich von Brühl, on the Brühl Terrace in Dresden. These include the Brühl Palace, the Brühl's library, the Brühl's Gallery, the Belvedere and the Brühl's garden. Brühl commissioned the enormous Swan Service of Meissen porcelain; he was the director of the factory.

Brühl's Terrace is known as the "Balcony of Europe", a name which was first thought up and used at the beginning of the 19th century and which since then has been used in all kinds of literature.

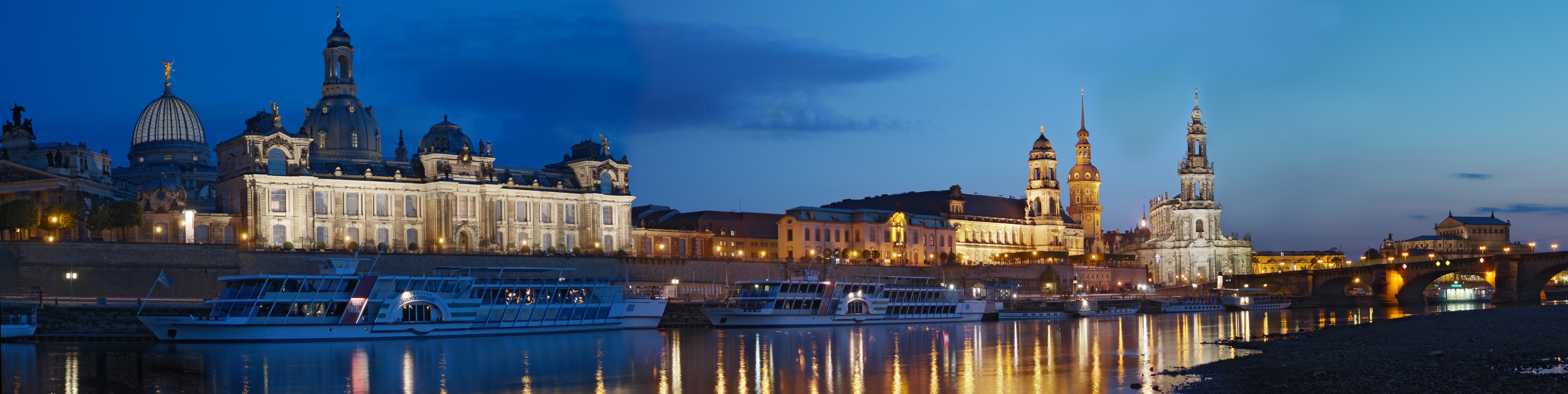
View over Brühl's Terrace

== In popular culture ==
Numerous books and films has been made about the family and its members. "Saxony's shine and Prussia's Glory: Brühl the Great Career" and "Saxony's shine and Prussia's Glory: Brühl the War" (1985) was two parts of a six-part television film aired in Germany. Polish author Józef Ignacy Kraszewski immortalized the von Brühl family in two novels from the 1870s ("Count Brühl", "From the Seven Years' War").

== Members ==
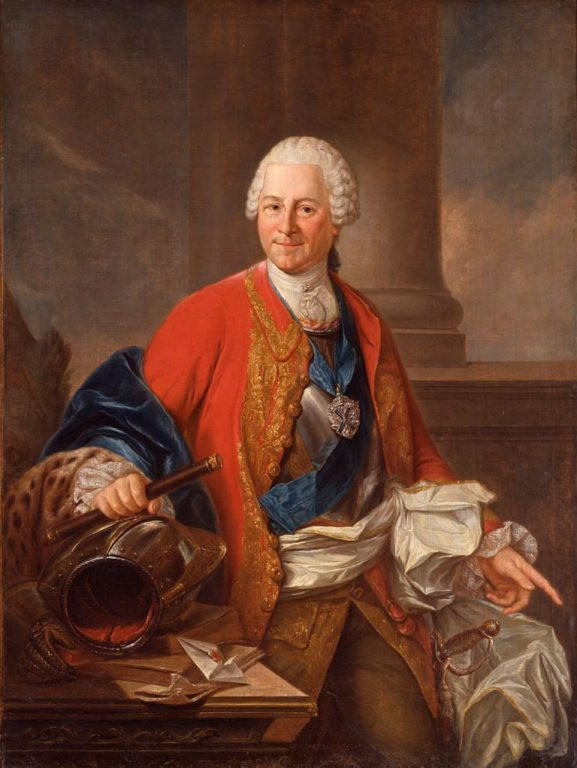
Heinrich von Brühl

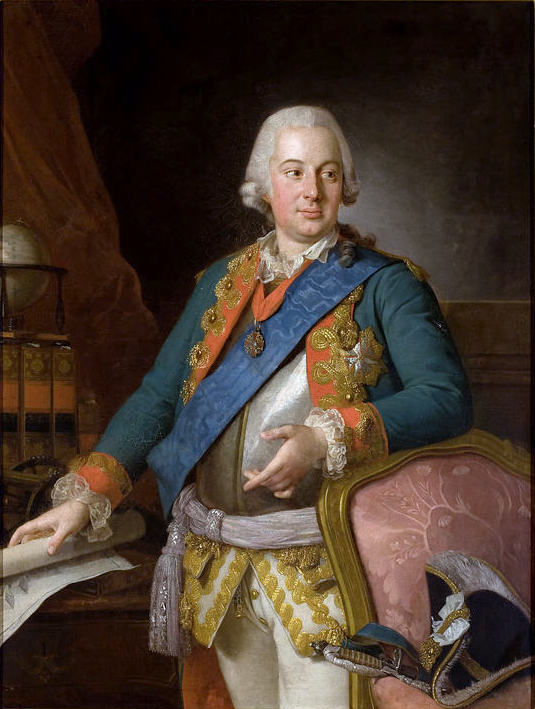
Alois Friedrich von Brühl

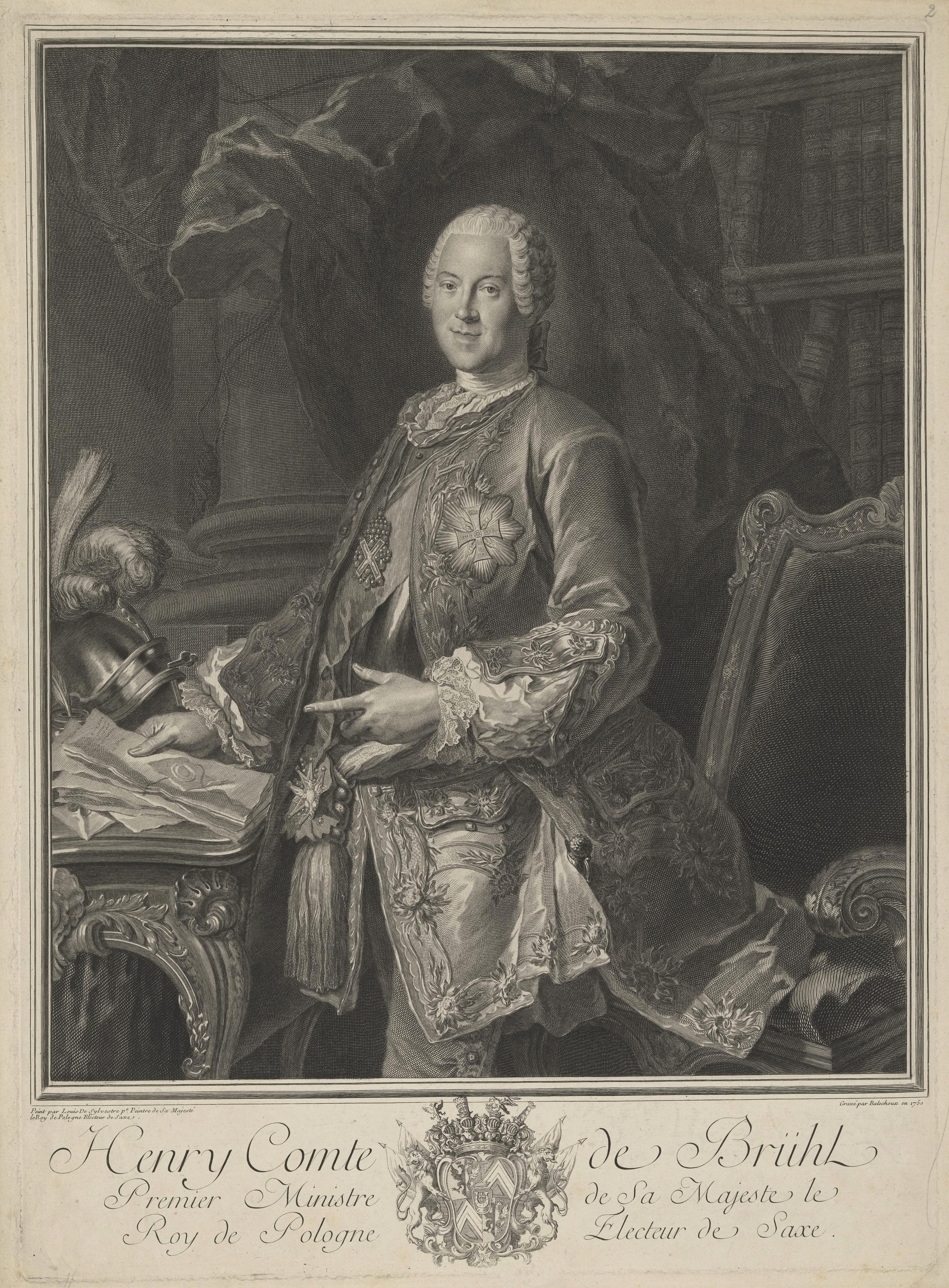
Heinrich von Brühl
(1700–1763)

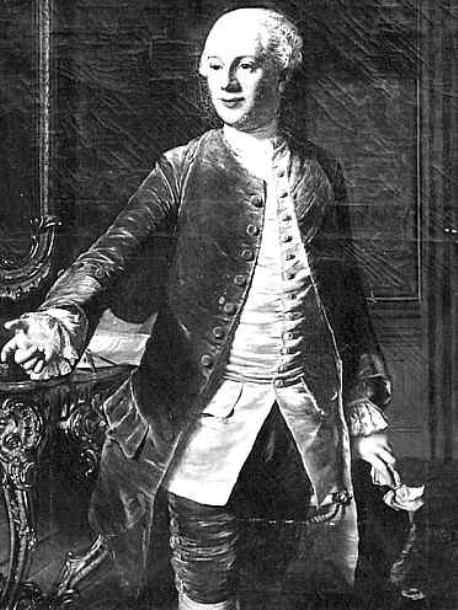
Alois Friedrich von Brühl
(1739–1793)

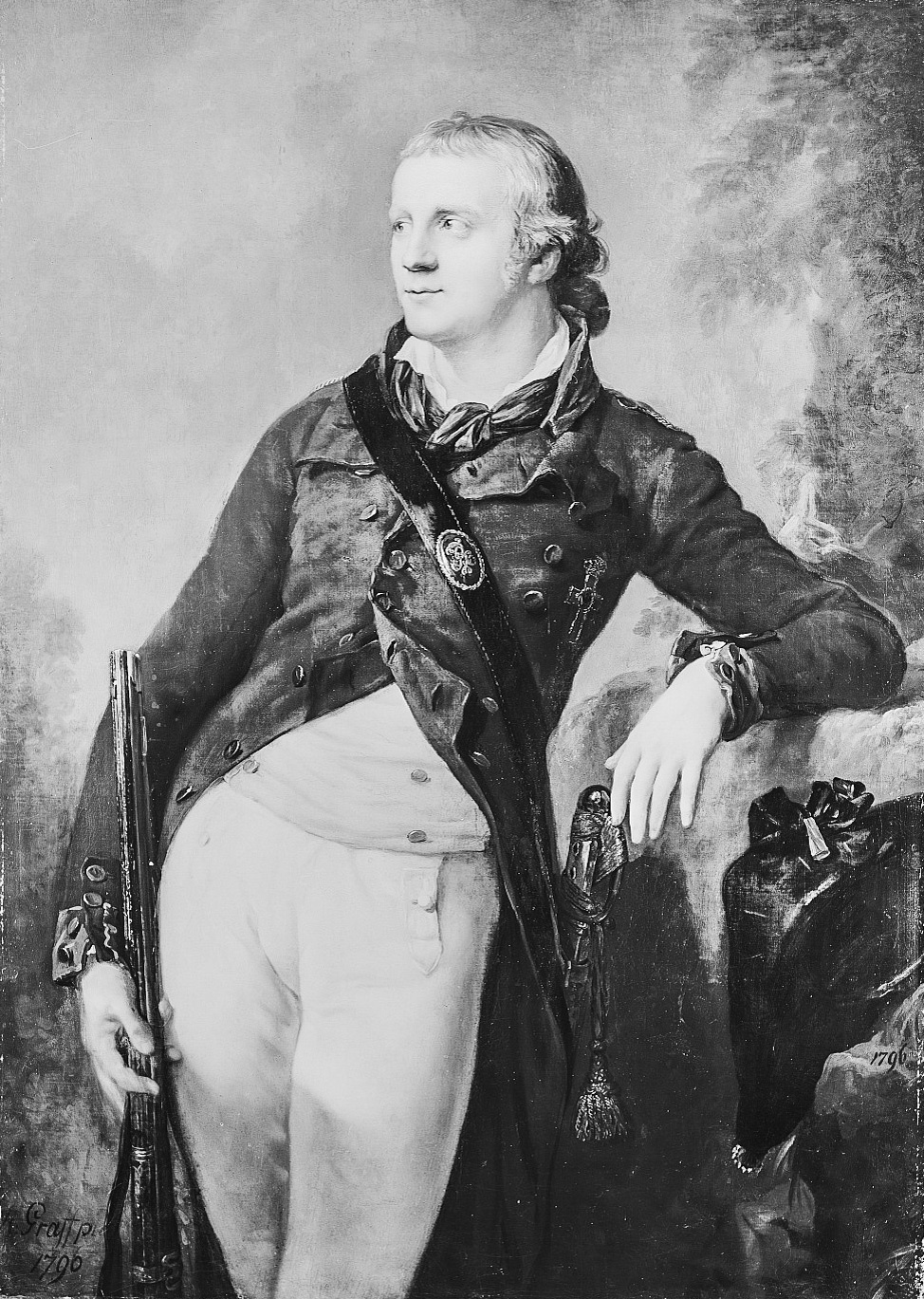
Carl von Brühl
(1772–1837)

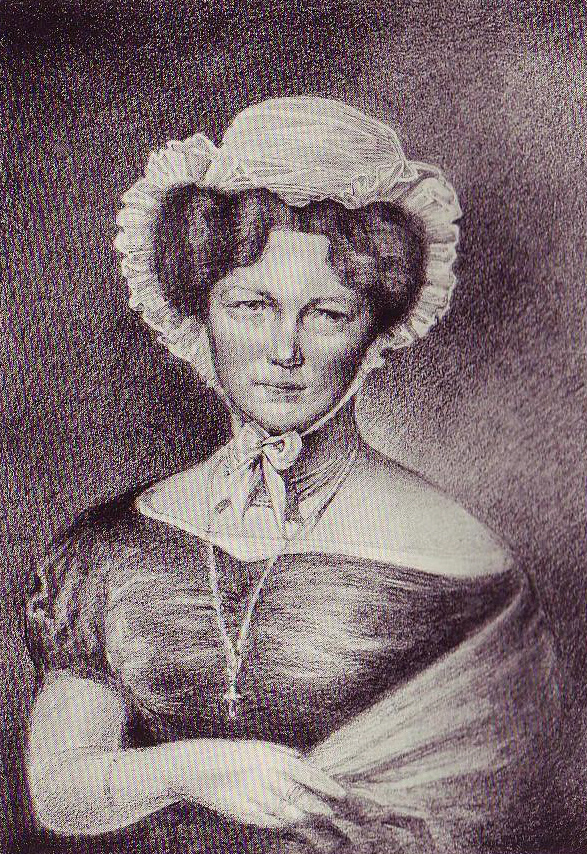
Marie von Clausewitz, geb. Gräfin von Brühl
(1779–1836)
- Heinrich von Brühl (1700–1763), prime minister of Saxony
- Hans Moritz von Brühl (1736–1809), Saxonian ambassador in London, scientist, writer, and philanthropist
- Alois Friedrich von Brühl (1739–1793), a Polish-Saxon diplomat, politician, Freemason, soldier, actor and playwright.
- Carl Adolph von Brühl (1742–1802), Saxonian and Prussian Lieutenant General, tutor to Frederick William III and his siblings
- Hans Moritz von Brühl (1746–1811), Saxonian nobleman, translator and artist
- Christina von Brühl (1756–1816), author and garden architect
- Carl von Brühl (Hans Moritz II, 1772–1837), a Prussian Geheimrat, friend of Goethe, director of the royal theatres in 1815-1828 and director of museums from 1829
- Marie von Brühl (1779–1836), wife of the Prussian general and military theorist Carl von Clausewitz
- Theresia Anna Maria von Brühl (1784–1844), pastel artist
- Friedrich-Joseph von Brühl (Maria Friedrich-Joseph Hubertus Michael Rupert Graf von Brühl; 1875–1949), hereditary member of the Prussian House of Lords
- Friedrich Wilhelm Graf von Brühl (1791–1859), Prussian Lieutenant General
- Friedrich Wilhelm von Brühl (1699–1760), Geheimrat in the Kingdom of Prussia and the Electorate of Saxony
- Friedrich Stephan von Brühl (1819–1893), from 1851 a member and from 1879 the chairman of the regional assembly of the Niederlausitz; and during 1851–1876 a member of the old, and then the new, Landtag of the Province of Brandenburg
- Friedrich-Franz von Brühl (1848–1911), member of the Prussian House of Lords and of the Niederlausitz Assembly of Estates
- Hans Moritz von Brühl (1849–1911), Lieutenant-General
- Ferdinand von Brühl (1851–1911), Major-General
- Franz von Brühl (1852–1928), administrative lawyer
- Alfred von Brühl (1862–1922), painter in Düsseldorf and director of the Art Academy of Königsberg
- Carl Brühl (1820–1899), was an Austrian physician and anatomist known for his work in the field of comparative osteology, and who also inspired Sigmund Freud.
- Christine von Brühl (born 1962), author and journalist

=== Brüel, branch ===
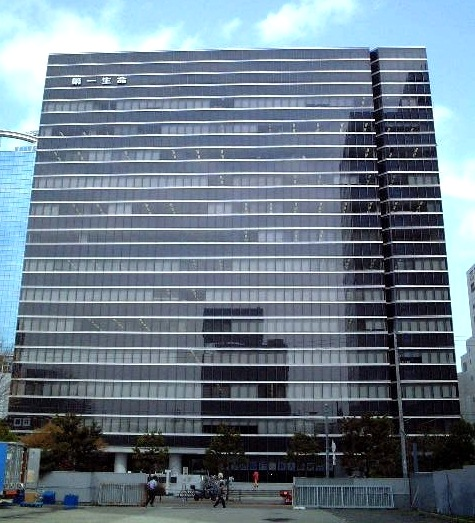
Osaka, Japan, one of Brüel & Kjær's offices

- Ludvig Bang Brüel (1904), Member of the Swedish Order of Vasa
- Birgit Brüel (1927–1996), Danish singer and actress
- Max Brüel (1927–1995), Danish architect and jazz musician, an accomplished pianist and saxophonist
- Per Vilhelm Brüel (1915–2015), Danish physicist, engineer, friend of Niels Bohr, and founder of the world's largest manufacturer and supplier of sound and vibration measurement equipment, systems and solutions, Brüel & Kjær.

=== United Kingdom, branch ===
- Lord Polwarth
- Marie Annie Fugger Brühl Countess of Brühl (1936).
- Peter Fugger Count of Brühl (1964)

== Family tree ==
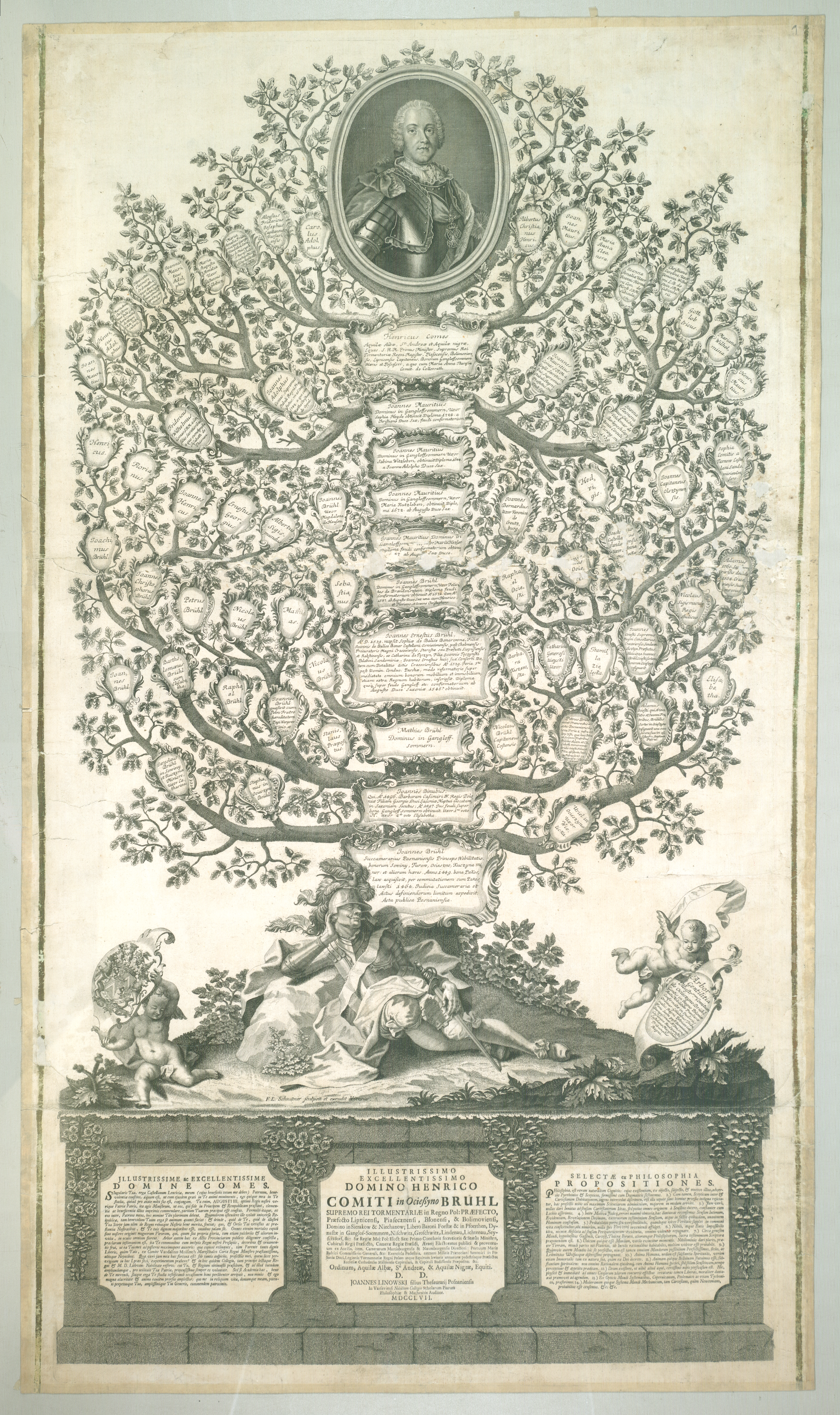

== Coat of arms ==
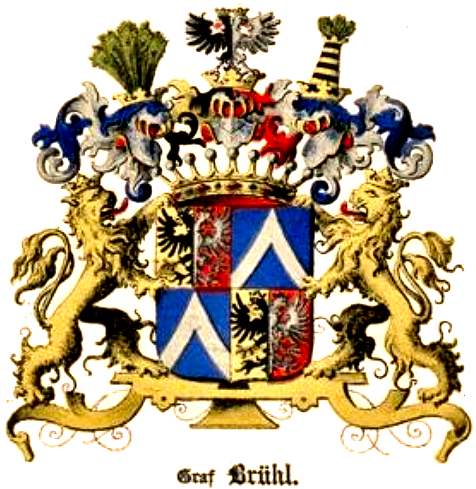
Coat of arms of the Counts of Brühl

- The Master of Arms shows in blue a silver rafters . On the crowned helmet are five natural peacock feathers. The helmet covers are in blue and silver.
- The Count's coat of arms from 1773 is quartered. Fields 1 and 4 are of gold with a red split, topped with a gold-crowned double-headed eagle, the right half black, the left silver, 2 and 3 in blue, the silver rafters (strain Arms). 3 helmets: the one on the right with blue-silver covers of five natural Plauen springs (strain helmet), on the middle with the right black and gold and red on the left-silver covers of the double-headed eagle on the left with red and silver covers a gold-winning, black and Gold five times shared column, sullied with three natural peacock feathers. Plate holder: two inward seeing and crowned golden lion.

== See also ==
- Brühl Palace, Warsaw
- Brühl's Terrace

== Literature ==
- Aladar of Boroviczeny: Graf von Brühl. The Medici. Richelieu and Rothschild his time. Amalthea-Verlag, Wien, among others 1930.
- Walter Fellmann: Count Heinrich Brühl. A life-time and image. 4th revised edition. Koehler & Amelang, Munich, etc. 2000, ISBN 3-7338-0232-2 .
- Heinrich Theodor Flathe : Brühl, Heinrich Graf von . In: General German Biography (ADB). Volume 3, Duncker & Humblot, Leipzig 1876, pp. 411–417.
- Roessler, Hellmuth: Brühl, Henry, Imperial Count. In: New German Biography (NDB). Volume 2, Duncker & Humblot, Berlin 1955, ISBN 3-428-00183-4, pp. 660–662 ( digitized ).
- Charles Louis de Pollnitz : Etat de la cour de Saxe abrégé, sous le raining d'Auguste III. roi de Pologne et Electeur de Saxe. sn, sl 1734 digitized .
- Dagmar Vogel: Heinrich Graf von Brühl. A Biography. Volume 1 [10] : 1700-1738 (= Series studies of historical research of modern times. Vol. 29). Kovač, Hamburg 2003, ISBN 3-8300-0859-7 .
