= Brüll =

Brüll or Bruell is a surname.

The British surname Bruell has been identified as a variation of Brewell, derived from the village of Braithwell, West Yorkshire.

Other variants of this surname include Briel, Brill and Bril. .

Notable people with the name include:

- Christopher Bruell (1942–2024), American philosopher
- Ignaz Brüll, composer
- Jan Bruell, psychologist and geneticist
- Nehemiah Brüll (1843–1891), rabbi and scholar
- Jakob Brüll (1812–1889), rabbi and Talmudic scholar

== See also ==
- Bruell F.C., early 20th-century American football club later known as Cleveland Bruell Insurance
- Brull (disambiguation)
- Bruel (disambiguation)
- Brühl (disambiguation)
