= Brühl palace =

Brühl Palace can refer to several buildings owned by Heinrich (Henryk) von Brühl:

- three palaces in Warsaw
- Brühl Palace, Warsaw (destroyed in 1944, near Piłsudski's Square)
- Brühl Palace, Młociny (in Bielany district of Warsaw)
- Brühl Palace, Wola (in Wola district, destroyed in the 19th century)
- Brühl Palace, Brody (in the city of Brody near Lublin)

== See also ==
- Brühl (disambiguation)
- Augustusburg and Falkenlust Palaces in Brühl (Rhineland)
- Brühl's Terrace in Dresden
