= Brill =

Brill may refer to:

== Places ==
- Brill, Buckinghamshire, a village in England
- Brill, Cornwall, a small village to the west of Constantine, Cornwall, UK
- Brill, Wisconsin, an unincorporated community, US
- Brill, Wuppertal, a quarter and town district, Germany

== Fictional characters ==
- Brill brothers (Mervall and Descant), from the Artemis Fowl book series
- Brill (Elfquest), in the comic Elfquest

== Companies ==
- Brill Publishers, a Dutch international academic publisher
- Brill Tramway, a former branch line of the Metropolitan Railway from Quainton Road to Brill
- J. G. Brill Company, a defunct manufacturer of streetcars in North America

== Other uses ==
- Brill (surname), for people who bear the family name Brill
- Brill (fish), a type of flatfish
- USS Brill (SS-330), a World War II American submarine
- Brill Building, a New York City building notable for its influential music industry tenants

== See also ==
- Bril, a surname
- Bril (disambiguation)
- Brielle, a town in the western Netherlands
- Brühl (disambiguation)
- Brüll, a surname
