= Sanne Brüel =

Danish actress and singer

- Born: 12 April 1952; Copenhagen, Denmark
- Died: 17 June 2011 (aged 58); Odense, Denmark
- Occupation(s): Actress, composer, singer
- Spouse: Niels Herskind
- Children: Kaya Brüel
- Parent(s): Max Brüel; Birgit Brüel
- Relatives: Rebecca Brüel (twin sister)

Sanne Brüel (12 April 1952 – 17 June 2011) was a Danish actress, composer and singer who, among other things. became known from DR's Christmas calendar Jullerup Færgeby, where she played Kaja.

Brüel was the twin sister of Rebecca Brüel, with whom she sang in Jomfru Ane Band. She was the mother of singer Kaya Brüel and the daughter of singer and actress Birgit Brüel and jazz musician and architect Max Brüel. Besides Rebecca, Sanne had half-sister Michaela and step-sister Puk.
