= Jürgen Luh =

German historian and exhibition curator (born 1963)

Jürgen Luh (born 1963) is a German historian and exhibition curator. He specialises in the history of Prussia and Germany from the Peace of Westphalia to the early nineteenth century.

== The Holy Roman Empire ==
Luh did his PhD with Gerd Heinrich (historian) at the Freie Universität zu Berlin, where his dissertation was published in 1995 as Unheiliges Römisches Reich: der konfessionelle Gegensatz 1648 bis 1806. He followed this in 2003 with Preussen, Deutschland und Europa 1701-2001, a collection of essays edited with Vinzenz Czech and Bert Becker.

== Military History ==
Dr. Luh has published books in both German and English examining the nature of warfare in Europe in the Long Eighteenth Century. He argued that, rather than looking at the eighteenth century for evidence of a "military revolution" which prefigured modern war, historians should examine the meaning that armies and warfare actually had for those living at the time. He revealed that eighteenth-century warfare was deeply rooted in the structure of princely states and noble society of the time. War aimed not to destroy the enemy but to win glory for the princes who waged it, and the appearance of both soldiers and armies (whether expressed in uniforms, or in elaborate parade-ground manoeuvres) was just as important as their actual capacity to do harm to the enemy.

== Prussian Palaces and Gardens Foundation ==
Jürgen Luh is Wissenschaftler at the Stiftung Preußischer Schlösser und Gärten (Prussian Palaces and Gardens Foundation, SPSG). In this capacity, he has helped put on a number of the SPSG's exhibitions, including 'Friederisiko' in 2012 and 'Frauensache: Wie Brandenburg Preußen wurde' in 2015.

== Frederick the Great ==
Dr. Luh has published extensively on the Prussian king Frederick the Great. His 2011 book Der Große: Friedrich II. von Preußen sought to resolve long-held ideas about the Prussian king's "contradictory" nature as both a patron of the Enlightenment and a military conqueror. Luh argued that Frederick in fact sought glory consistently throughout his life, and that this took various forms. Frederick saw his reputation as an author and a companion of Voltaire as simply an alternative way of achieving fame and immortality, alongside military success and the conquest of territory.

Dr. Luh was also the co-organiser, with Michael Kaiser and others, of the Friedrich300 series of colloquia to mark the 300th anniversary of Frederick's birth in 2012. These presented important new research about Frederick, including explanations of the place of his literary activity within the wider programme of his reign.

Luh has also published numerous other works on Frederick, including a study of his brother Prince Henry's "Gallery of Heroes" at Schloss Rheinsberg, and a discussion of Frederick's enmity toward the Saxon chief minister Count Brühl.

== Publications ==
- Luh, Jürgen (1995). Unheiliges Römisches Reich: der konfessionelle Gegensatz 1648 bis 1806 [Unholy Roman Empire: the confessional conflict 1648 to 1806] (in German). Verlag für Berlin-Brandenburg. ISBN 978-3-930850-08-2.
- Luh, Jürgen (2000). Ancien Régime Warfare and the Military Revolution: A Study. INOS. ISBN 978-90-73432-06-2.
- Luh, Jürgen; Czech, Vinzenz (2003). Preussen, Deutschland und Europa, 1701-2001 [Prussia, Germany and Europe, 1701-2001] (in German). INOS. ISBN 978-90-73432-08-6.
- Luh, Jürgen (2004). Kriegskunst in Europa 1650-1800 [The art of war in Europe 1650-1800] (in German). Böhlau. ISBN 978-3-412-13703-8.
- Luh, Jürgen (2007). Heinrichs Heroen: die Feldherrengalerie des Prinzen Heinrich im Schloss Rheinsberg [Henry's Heroes: Prince Henry's Gallery of Generals in Rheinsberg Castle] (in German). Ed. Rieger. ISBN 978-3-935231-88-6.
- Luh, Jürgen; Kaiser, Michael (2007-2013) Friedrich300 Colloquien
- Luh, Jürgen (2012). Der Große: Friedrich II. von Preußen [The Great Frederick II of Prussia] (in German). Munich: Penguin Random House Verlagsgruppe GmbH. ISBN 978-3-641-06129-6.
- Luh, Jürgen (1 January 2015). "Feinde fürs Leben. Friedrich der Große und Heinrich von Brühl" [Enemies for life. Frederick the Great and Henry of Brühl]. New Archive for Saxon History. 85. Saxon State Library – State and University Library Dresden: 277–284. doi:10.52411/nasg.bd.85.2014.s.277-284. ISSN 0944-8195.
- Luh, Jürgen (2015). Der kurze Traum der Freiheit: Preussen nach Napoleon [The Brief Dream of Freedom: Prussia after Napoleon] (in German). Siedler. ISBN 978-3-8275-0039-7.
