= Brill (surname) =

Brill is a German and English surname. Notable people with the surname include:

== Artists ==
- John Frederick Brill (died 1942), British World War II soldier and mural artist
- Matthijs Brill, and Paul Brill, 16th century Flemish landscape painters
- Slavko Brill (1900–1943), Croatian sculptor

== Athletes ==
- Dean Brill (born 1985), English footballer
- Debbie Brill (born 1953), Canadian high-jumper
- Frank Brill (1864–1944), American bowler and baseball player
- Karl Brill (fl. 1900s), American football player
- Martin Brill (born 1956), New Zealand fencer
- Marty Brill (American football) (1906–1973), football coach
- Sam Brill (born 1985), American soccer player

== Businesspeople ==
- E. J. Brill, founder of Brill Publishers (Leiden)
- J. G. Brill, founder of J. G. Brill and Company
- Ron Brill, American businessman and co-founder of Home Depot

== Educators ==
- Ann Brill, Dean of the School of Journalism at Kansas University
- Ralph Brill (1935–2019), Professor of Law at Chicago-Kent College of Law

== Musicians ==
- Karsten Brill, German singer better known as Attila Dorn
- Logan Brill, American singer
- Shirley Brill, Israeli clarinetist

== Performers ==
- Charlie Brill (born 1938), American actor
- Eddie Brill, American comedian, writer, and actor
- Fran Brill (born 1946), American voice actress and puppeteer, worked on Sesame Street
- Lindy Brill (born 1963), British actress
- Marty Brill (comedian) (1932–2021), American comedian
- Patti Brill (1923–1963), American actress, singer, dancer

== Politicians and government officials ==
- Arthur Brill, German politician during the 1920s and 1930s
- Barry Brill (born 1940), New Zealand politician
- Francis Brill (1836–1913), American farmer and politician
- Hermann Brill (1895–1959), German politician who opposed the rise of Nazism
- Howard W. Brill (born 1943), chief justice of the Arkansas Supreme Court
- Julie Brill, commissioner of the Federal Trade Commission
- Lindee Brill (born 1981), Wisconsin politician

== Scientists ==
- Abraham Brill (1874–1948), Austrian-born American psychiatrist
- Alexander von Brill (1842–1935), German mathematician
- Eric Brill, computer scientist
- Henry Brill (1906–1990), American psychiatrist
- Nathan Edwin Brill (1860–1925), American physician
- Robert H. Brill, American archaeologist and chemist
- Steve Brill, American naturalist
- Yvonne Brill (1924–2013), Canadian rocket scientist

== Writers ==
- Bill Brill (1931–2011), American sportswriter
- Paul Brill, American composer, songwriter, and producer
- Steven Brill (filmmaker) (born 1962), American film director, screenwriter, producer and actor
- Steven Brill (journalist) (born 1950), founder of American Lawyer magazine and other information services
- William H. Brill (1871–1923), American journalist

== Others ==
- Angel Kreiman Brill (1945–2014), Chief Rabbi of Chile
- David Brill (cinematographer) (born 1944), Australian journalist
- David P. Brill (1955–1979), American gay rights advocate
- Jeanette Goodman Brill (1888–1964), American lawyer and judge
- Kurt Brill (1916–1978), Wehrmacht officer
- Samuel Löw Brill (1814–1897), Hungarian rabbi
- William Brill (RAAF officer) (1916–1964), Australian military pilot
