= Marie von Clausewitz: The Woman Behind the Making of On War =

- First edition
- Author: Vanya Eftimova Bellinger
- Language: United States
- Subject: Marie von Brühl
- Genre: Biography, History
- Publisher: Oxford University Press
- Publication date: November 1, 2015
- ISBN: 9780190225445
- OCLC: 927100697
- Website: clauswitz.com

Marie Von Clausewitz: The Woman Behind the Making of On War is a biography of Marie von Brühl, written by journalist and military historian, Vanya Eftimova Bellinger. The book was released in 2015.

== Summary ==
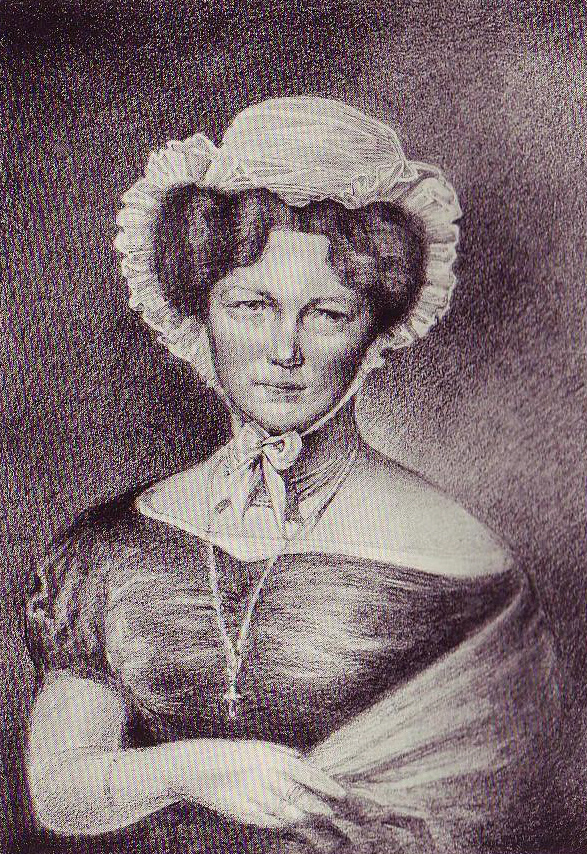
Marie von Brühl: Subject of Bellinger's biography

The book explores the life of Marie von Clausewitz, who was a member of the noble German Brühl family and married to military theorist, Carl von Clausewitz. After her husband's death in 1831, Marie edited and published her husband's books, the most famous one being, On War. Author Vanya Eftimova Bellinger examines the life of a "wealthy, cultured, and politically engaged" woman through archives and letters written between Marie and her husband.

== Development history ==
Bellinger became interested in writing about Marie von Clausewitz after reading On War for the second time. She realized that no one had written in depth about Marie editing On War, and decided it would be worthwhile to study. After corresponding with various archives in Berlin, she was informed by the Prussian State Privy that family papers, including "intimate correspondence" between Marie and Carl, were donated by the aristocratic Buttlar family. The Buttlars are direct descendants of Marie's brother, Fritz.

== Reception ==
The book has received positive reviews. Reviewer Jerry Lenaburg wrote, "read this book to truly understand how this dynamic formed a loving and unprecedented marriage and intellectual partnership." Another reviewer praises Bellinger's ability to present Clausewitz as a woman who was politically savvy, and did everything to ensure her husband's work was preserved.
