= Christine von Brühl =

German author and journalist

- Born: Christine Gräfin von Brühl; 31 December 1962 (age 63); Accra, Ghana
- Occupations: Author, journalist
- Children: 2
- Relatives: Dietrich von Brühl (father)
- Writing career
- Language: German

Christine Gräfin von Brühl (born 31 December 1962) is a German author and journalist.

== Life and career ==
Brühl grew up in Accra, London, Brussels and Bonn due to her father's regular transfer as a diplomat. She studied Slavic studies, Eastern European history and philosophy in Mainz, Vienna, Lublin and Heidelberg. In 1990, she moved to Dresden. After an internship at the Sächsische Zeitung and journalistic work there as an editor in Freital, she wrote for Die Zeit and the journal Das Magazin. In 1992, she received her doctorate at Heidelberg University; her dissertation is titled The non-verbal means of expression in Anton Chekhov's stage work. Her own book publications as a freelance author followed.

== Family ==
Christine Gräfin von Brühl is the third child of diplomat Dietrich Graf von Brühl and Maria-Oktavia Gräfin von Brühl, née Maria Oktavia Monika Coletta Christophora Sophie Joanna Walburga, Countess of Waldburg zu Wolfegg and Waldsee. Heinrich von Brühl is one of the ancestors of the author, to whom the Brühl's Terrace and Brühl Glories in Dresden can be traced back.

Brühl lives in Berlin, is married and has two children.

== Bibliography ==
- Schwäne in Weiß und Gold. Berlin 2021, ISBN 978-3-3510-3781-9
- Gerade dadurch sind sie mir lieb: Theodor Fontanes Frauen. Berlin 2018, ISBN 978-3-3510-3730-7.
- Anmut im märkischen Sand. Die Frauen der Hohenzollern. Berlin 2015, ISBN 3-351-03597-7.
- Von Hundert auf Glücklich. Wie ich die Langsamkeit wiederentdeckte. 2011, ISBN 3-352-00822-1.
- Die preußische Madonna. Auf den Spuren der Königin Luise. Berlin 2015, ISBN 3-7466-3114-9.
- Out of Adel 2009, ISBN 978-3-378-00693-5.
- Gebrauchsanweisung für Dresden, München 2012, ISBN 3-492-27623-7.
- Noblesse Oblige. Die Kunst, ein adliges Leben zu führen. Frankfurt am Main 2009, ISBN 978-3-8218-5695-7.
- Brühlsche Terrasse und Schwanenservice. Alltagserlebnisse in Sachsen. Taucha 1996, ISBN 3-910074-50-2.
