= Brull =

Brull may refer to:

- El Brull, municipality in Barcelona Province, Catalonia, Spain
- Mató cheese, typical Catalan cheese (alternative name)
- Brossat, a Catalan cheese

== See also ==
- Brüll, a surname
