= Meissen Fountain =

The Meissen Fountain is a historic decorative fountain made of Meissen porcelain. It is "the largest single Meissen porcelain figure group in existence." It is held at the Victoria and Albert Museum in London, United Kingdom.

== History ==
The Meissen Fountain was designed from 1745 to 1757. It was modelled by Johann Joachim Kändler for Count Heinrich von Brühl. The baroque design of the table fountain was based on the Neptune Fountain in the gardens of the count's summer palace in Dresden. It shows Amphitrite and Neptune drawn by hippocampi. It was displayed by von Brühl at his state dinners. For example, Sir Charles Hanbury Williams, who served as the British ambassador in Dresden, mentions it in his writings. Between 1774 and 1815, some parts were added.

The fountain was acquired by the Victoria and Albert Museum in London, United Kingdom, in 1870. Under the leadership of Reino Leifkes, it was restored in 2014, in collaboration with the Royal College of Art. As the fountain was broken in pieces, 3D modelling was used to rebuild it.
