= David P. Brill =

American activist and journalist

David P. Brill (1955–1979) was a Boston-based gay rights activist and investigative journalist.

Brill studied political science at the University of Massachusetts Boston. He was one of the nation's first investigative journalists for the gay press, and for more than six years served as chief investigative reporter and political commentator for the weekly Gay Community News, chronicling issues relevant to the lives of gay people. He was also a correspondent for Boston Magazine and the California-based gay interest magazine The Advocate. He sought to make city and state government, the media, and especially the police, more responsive to the needs of gay men and lesbians; through his special concern with the subject of violence against gays, he initially brought this issue to the eye of law enforcement officials and the public. He was also a member of the Homophile Union of Boston and Gay Legislation and lobbied for a better understanding of gay people and laws to protect their civil rights.

In his roles as political writer and gay rights advocate, Brill came to know well Boston Police Lt. William J. Bratton, who credited Brill for "liberalizing police attitudes towards gays by opening up a relationship with the police. Prior to writing a story, he'd always come to us for our side. There was a trust established between David and the command staff here at headquarters." Bratton (who went on to be Superintendent in Chief of the Boston Police Department, Commissioner of the New York City Police Department and Chief of Police of the Los Angeles Police Department) mentioned Brill in his 1998 book, The Turnaround: How America's Top Cop Reversed the Crime Epidemic.
