= Kaya Brüel =

Danish singer and actress

- Born: 30 August 1972 (age 53); Copenhagen, Denmark
- Occupations: Singer, songwriter, actress
- Years active: 1991–present
- Known for: Jungledyret Hugo (1993-2007)
- Spouse: Kenneth Kainz
- Children: Asta Brüel Kainz; Alois Kainz
- Parent(s): Sanne Brüel; Niels Herskind
- Musical career
- Genres: Pop; Jazz
- Instrument: Vocals
- Labels: ArtPeople (2006–present); Stunt Records (2008); ManRec (1999); Replay Records (1991–1995)

Kaya Brüel (born 30 August 1972) is a Danish singer, songwriter and actress.

== Career ==
As an 18-year-old, Brüel signed a contract with the record company Replay Records. Brüel received an advance of DKK 20,000 in exchange for releasing three albums on the company. Brüel debuted in 1991 with cover versions of hits from the 60s and 70s on the album Kaya, produced by Jens Rugsted. The album sold 80,000 copies. This was followed by The State I'm In (1992) and Sweet Reality (1995), which could not measure up to the success of the debut album. At the same time, Brüel felt that she had been led astray by the record company, which showed little interest in Brüel's own written songs. In response to the established record industry, Kaya released her fourth album on jazz musician Thomas Blachman's record label ManRec. The jazz and soul album Complex was well received by the music press, but did not become a commercial success. In 2000, she sang the vocals for the trance single Light A Rainbow by Danish Tukan, which in 2001 reached number 38 on the English charts. In 2006, Brüel's Jeg fandt en sang på veje was released as an album of children's songs with music by great-grandfather Axel Brüel to lyrics by Halfdan Rasmussen. The album received a gold record for 15,000 copies sold in 2008. Brüel returned to jazz music on the album The Love List from 2008, which consists of her own compositions and songs from the theater performance Woyzeck with music by Tom Waits.

Brüel has sung several contributions on Danmarks Radio's Oh Abe releases and has voiced several cartoons, including Jungledyret Hugo, with which she debuted in 1993, where she voiced the fox Rita. She has also appeared in plays such as The Nutcracker from 2004.

In 2006 she was a judge on the TV show Showtime and on 7 October, she participated in the entertainment program Gu 'Ske Lov Du Kom on TV3. In 2010 she participated in the Dansk Melodi Grand Prix with the song "Only Tonight", which moved on from the preliminary round. Brüel participated in 2011 in Vild med dans with the professional dancer Steen Lund.

== Personal life ==
Brüel is the daughter of singer Sanne Brüel and architect Niels Herskind. She is married to film director Kenneth Kainz, with whom she has a daughter, Asta Brüel Kainz, and a son, Alois Kainz.

== Discography ==
- Kaya (1991)
- The State I'm In (1992)
- Sweet Reality (1995)
- Complex (1999)
- Jeg fandt en sang på vejen (2006)
- The Love List (2008)
- Med Dannebrog på næsen (2008)
- Julen varer længe (with Ole Kibsgaard) (2010)
- Nu&Nær (2016)

== Filmography ==
=== Movies ===
| Year | Title | Role | Notes |
|---|---|---|---|
| 1987 | Negerkys og labre larver | | |
| 1990 | Kys mor, skat! | Jeanette, David's girlfriend | |
| 1993 | Jungledyret Hugo | Rita | voice role |
| 1996 | Jungledyret Hugo 2 – den store filmhelt | Rita | voice role |
| 1997 | Det store flip | sangerinde | |
| 2004 | Familien Gregersen | Kirsten | |
| 2005 | Veninder | Camilla | |
| 2006 | Rene hjerter | | |
| 2006 | Der var engang en dreng | | |
| 2007 | Jungledyret Hugo 3 – fræk, flabet og fri | Rita | voice role |

=== Theater ===
| Year | Title | Role | Notes |
|---|---|---|---|
| 2007 | Matador | Ingeborg Andersen-Skjern | |

=== Television ===
| Year | Title | Role | Notes |
|---|---|---|---|
| 2002–2003 | Jungledyret Hugo (TV Series) | Rita | voice role |

=== Series ===
| Year | Title | Role | Notes |
|---|---|---|---|
| 2001 | De udvalgte | Miriam | |
| 2003–04 | Forsvar | Sara Leegaard | afsnit 10–11 & 13 |
| 2009 | Manden med de gyldne ører | Trisse Tiesgaard | |
| 2010–13 | Borgen | Nina Dahl | Season 2–3 |
| 2011–12 | Lykke | Susanne Kampmann | Season 2–3 & 10 |
| 2013 | Broen II | Gitte | |
| 2017 | Mercur | Raquel Rastenni | afsnit 4 |
