= Gangloffsömmern =

- Municipality
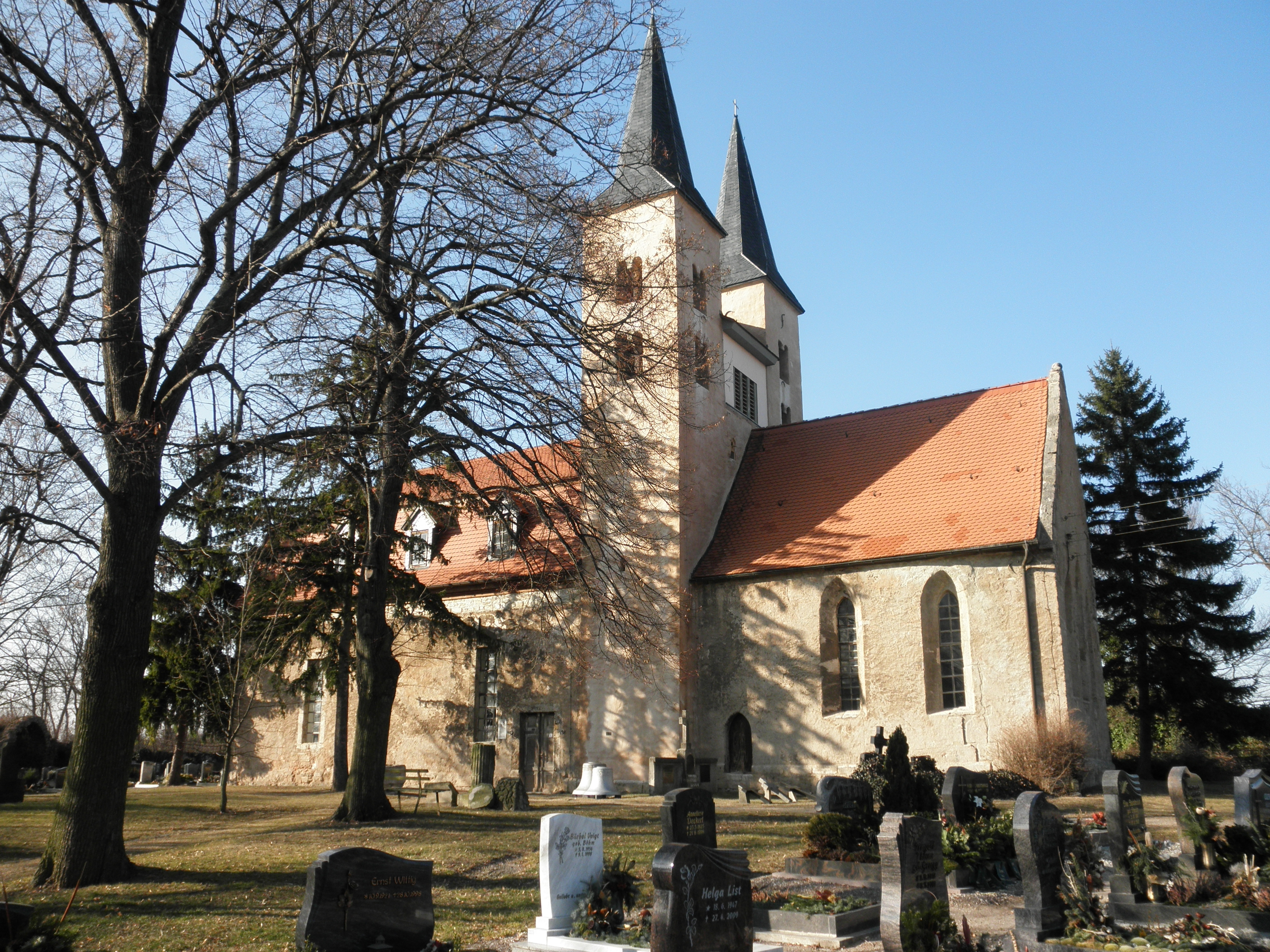

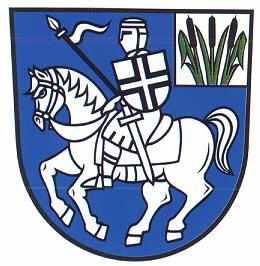
- Coat of arms

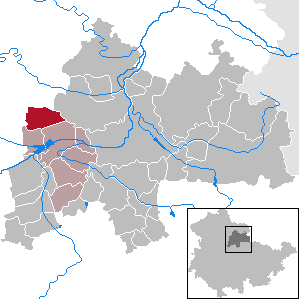
- Location of Gangloffsömmern within Sömmerda district
- Interactive map of Gangloffsömmern
- Location within Germany Location within Thuringia
- Coordinates: 51°11′N 10°56′E
- Country: Germany
- State: Thuringia
- District: Sömmerda
- Municipal assoc.: Straußfurt

Government
  - Mayor (2022–28): Sven Tschapeller

Area
  - Total: 14.58 km^{2} (5.63 sq mi)
- Elevation: 173 m (568 ft)

Population (2025-12-31)
  - Total: 915
  - Density: 62.8/km^{2} (163/sq mi)
- Time zone: UTC+01:00 (CET)
  - Summer (DST): UTC+02:00 (CEST)
- Postal codes: 99634
- Dialling codes: 036376
- Vehicle registration: SÖM
- Website: www.gangloffsoemmern.de

Gangloffsömmern is a municipality in the Sömmerda district of Thuringia, Germany.

== People born in Gangloffsömmern ==
- Heinrich von Brühl, Polish-Saxon statesman
