= Marie von Brühl =

German noblewoman (1779–1836)

Countess Marie Sophie von Clausewitz
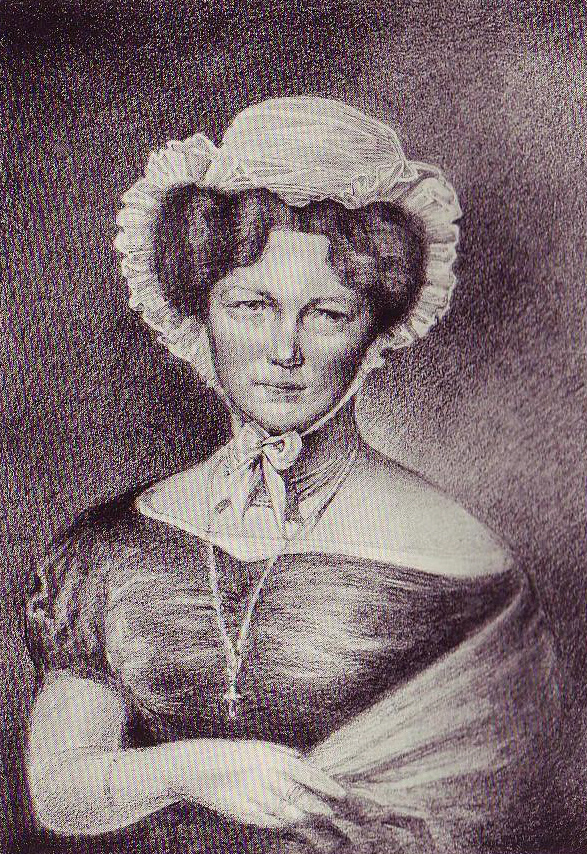
- Lithograph of Maria Sophia Gräfin von Brühl (before 1830) by an unknown author
- Born: Maria Sophia Gräfin von Brühl; June 3, 1779; Warsaw, Kingdom of Poland, Polish–Lithuanian Commonwealth
- Died: January 28, 1836 (aged 56); Dresden, Kingdom of Saxony, German Confederation
- Spouse: Carl von Clausewitz (m. 1810; died 1831)

Marie Sophie von Clausewitz (born Maria Sophia Gräfin von Brühl; 3 June 1779 – 28 January 1836) was a member of the noble German Brühl family originating in Thuringia. In addition to her career as a patron of the arts in Berlin, she is known for editing and publishing the work of her husband Carl von Clausewitz, especially his military treatise On War.

== Early life and career ==
Brühl was born in Warsaw, a daughter of Count Carl Adolph von Brühl (1742–1802) by his marriage to Sophie Gomm (1761–1837). Her paternal grandfather was Polish-Saxon statesman Heinrich von Brühl, while her mother was an aunt of the British field marshal William Maynard Gomm. Her parents had named her Maria Sophia, but she was called Marie by her family. She was the oldest child, but many of her siblings died as infants. Therefore, Marie was protective of her sister Fanny, who had survived the smallpox epidemic. When Fanny died in March 1804 due to complications during childbirth, Marie was left to care for the orphaned daughter. Brühl also treated her younger brother Fitz more like a son than her sibling.

Her education began at home under her father's guidance. He taught Marie how to write and read in French, and how to compose letters in a manner appropriate for a "lady of high society." Her mother taught her English, which Marie spoke fluently and later taught to her friends' children. Marie and Fanny also took lessons in painting, music, and history. It was their mother's intention to create "true phenomena" out of her daughters.

She was a talented painter and patron of the arts. She was a close friend of the novelist Bettina von Arnim and her husband Ludwig Achim von Arnim, and of Sophie von Schwerin.

At the age of 18, Brühl became a lady-in-waiting to queen dowager Frederika Louisa of Hesse-Darmstadt. This position was terminated in February 1805 by the queen dowager's death. Later, she became the chief lady-in-waiting to Princess Charlotte, who was only eleven years old at the time. After the death of her husband, Brühl assumed the role of chief lady-in-waiting to Princess Augusta in Berlin. One of her duties was to look after and educate Prince Frederick, who would later be known as Emperor Frederick III.

In 1813, in the closing stages of the Napoleonic Wars, Brühl was a volunteer nurse in a military hospital.

== Years with Carl von Clausewitz ==
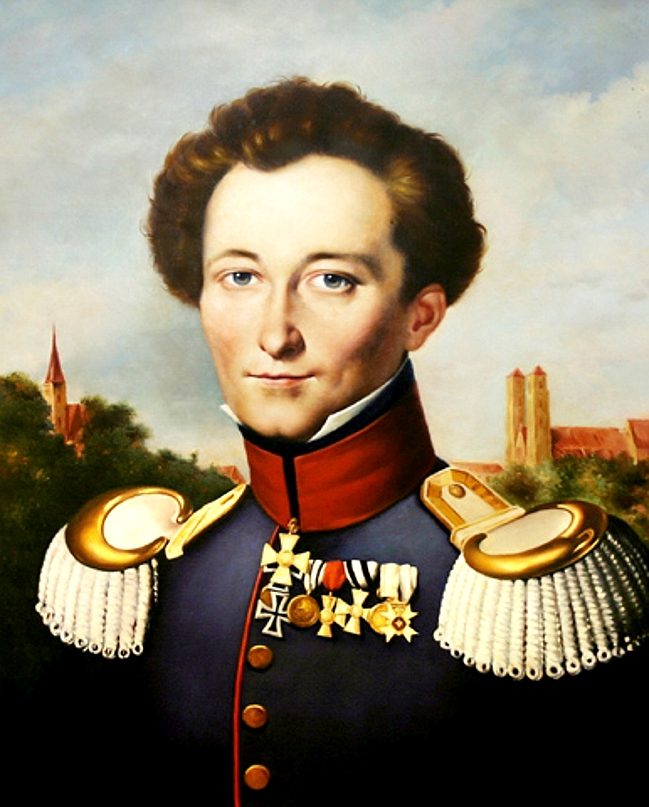
Painting of Carl von Clausewitz

Brühl met Carl von Clausewitz in December 1803 through their mutual friends, Princess Louise and her husband Prince Antoni Radziwiłł. Their meeting came less than a year after Brühl's father's unexpected death due to complications from liver disease in July 1802.

The two had a lengthy courtship for various reasons; one being her mother's disapproval of the relationship with a man of lesser social standing. Clausewitz had no inheritance and would have to rely solely on his lieutenant's pay, which was not enough to support a family. To marry without her mother's blessing would not have been legally possible.

Marie herself was hesitant to commit to the relationship and had to consider all the circumstances surrounding the courtship. She was in her late twenties when the correspondence began between Carl and herself. This was considered past high society's "marrying age." Yet Brühl was one of the few unmarried women during that time who earned an income on her own. She did not want to lose what she referred to as her "inner freedom."

The two made their relationship official in May 1806. In August 1810, Clausewitz received an important letter from Friedrich Wilhelm that promoted him to the rank of major, and gave him official permission to marry. On 17 December 1810, Brühl married Clausewitz.

The two frequently discussed politics, literature, and current events together. They considered each other equals, which was rare for a man to think of regarding his own wife.

Carl and Marie were unable to conceive children. Present day theories point to Carl's chronic illness as the culprit.

The two were married for a total of 21 years, up until Clausewitz's death.

From 1832 to 1834, following Clausewitz's unexpected death from cholera in 1831, she edited and published several of his books, including his most famous one, On War. Throughout their correspondence, Marie insisted that Carl send her his drafts and notes for safekeeping. He was known to have an unorganized writing process that would often lead to lost papers and unfinished ideas. In fact, when Carl was writing On War, Marie acted as the researcher and copywriter for the book. Marie's handwriting can be found on some of the pages of the On War manuscript, listing notes and references. Additionally, Brühl wrote a preface to On War. In the summer of 1832, less than a year after Carl's death, a publishing house in Berlin had put out announcements advertising the upcoming publication of On War. With the help of her brother, Marie transcribed drafts and inserted changes for On War in a manner of months.

== Later years and death ==
Toward the end of her life, Brühl complained of tightness in her chest and ringing in her ears. She lived a busy life with an irregular and hectic schedule. Along with her responsibilities as chief lady-in-waiting, von Brühl also put pressure on herself to publish her deceased husband's works. Those around her were concerned about her health, mood swings, and frequent restlessness. Marie suffered a psychological breakdown after an intense fight with her mother.

After the episode, doctors prescribed various treatments and medications including, "bloodletting, laxatives, and nauseant." These seemed to be making Marie sicker and less lucid; she sometimes even spoke of herself in the third person. Her cousin Carl von Brühl insisted on moving her to Dresden to salvage what was left of her health. According to one of her nurses, Marie's arm seemed to have become infected due to the practice of bloodletting. She may have also contracted hepatitis from the bloodletting instruments. Due to the lack of knowledge about modern medicine and infections, the doctor in Dresden simply diagnosed Marie with damaged nerves and ceased treatment. Brühl died on January 28, 1836, at the age of 56.

== Legacy ==
Her portrait of Prussian Field marshal August Neidhardt von Gneisenau is in the collection of Deutsches Historisches Museum.

Marie von Clausewitz: The Woman Behind the Making of On War is a biography on Marie von Brühl, written by journalist and military historian Vanya Eftimova Bellinger.
