= Joachim Bruel =

Catholic theologian and historian (died 1653)

Joachim Bruel (Brulius; died June 29, 1653) was a Catholic theologian and historian.

== Life ==
Bruel was born early in the seventeenth century at Vorst, a village of the province of Brabant, Belgium. After entering the order to assist in the establishment of Augustinians he was sent to Bourges, France, to finish his studies in philosophy and theology. At Bourges he received the degree of Master in Sacred Theology.

In 1638 he was chosen prior of the convent of his order at Cologne. Twice afterwards (1640 and 1649) he filled the office of prior provincial.

== Works ==
Bruel's published works include:

- Historiae Peruanae Ordinis Eremitarum S.P. Augustini: Libri octodecim. This work follows the Spanish Cronica moralizada del Orden de San Augustin en el Peru, published by Antonio de la Calancha, Barcelona, 1638; continued by Diego de Cordova, and printed at Lima, 1653. Bruel's Latin version was printed at Antwerp, 1651.
- A Latin translation of Juan González de Mendoza's history of China, Rerum Morumque in Regno Chinensi etc.
