= Bril =

Bril is a surname. Notable people with the surname include:

- Ben Bril, Dutch boxer
- Joel Bril, pen name of Joel Löwe
- Matthaeus Bril, Flemish painter
- Paul Bril, Flemish painter, brother of Matthaeus

== See also ==
- Brill (disambiguation)
- Brühl (disambiguation)
