= Angel Kreiman Brill =

Argentine-Chilean rabbi (1945–2014)

Rabbi Dr. Angel Kreiman-Brill
- Born: December 22, 1945; Buenos Aires, Argentina
- Died: January 5, 2014 (aged 68); Rancagua, Chile
- Resting place: Buenos Aires, Argentina
- Years active: 1964-2014
- Known for: Chief Rabbi of Chile in the 1970s and 80s
- Spouse: Julia Susana Wolinsky (m. 1969; died 1994)
- Awards: Human Rights Award of the Chilean National Commission of Human Rights (1989)

Angel Kreiman-Brill (December 22, 1945 – January 5, 2014) was the Chief Rabbi of Chile during the 1970s and 1980s. Kreiman-Brill was a leader in interfaith outreach and cooperation, especially with Catholicism.

== Early life and education ==
Kreiman was born in Buenos Aires, Argentina, and grew up in a secular family. He attended Morim Seminary where he received a professorship in Hebrew and Judaic Sciences in 1963.

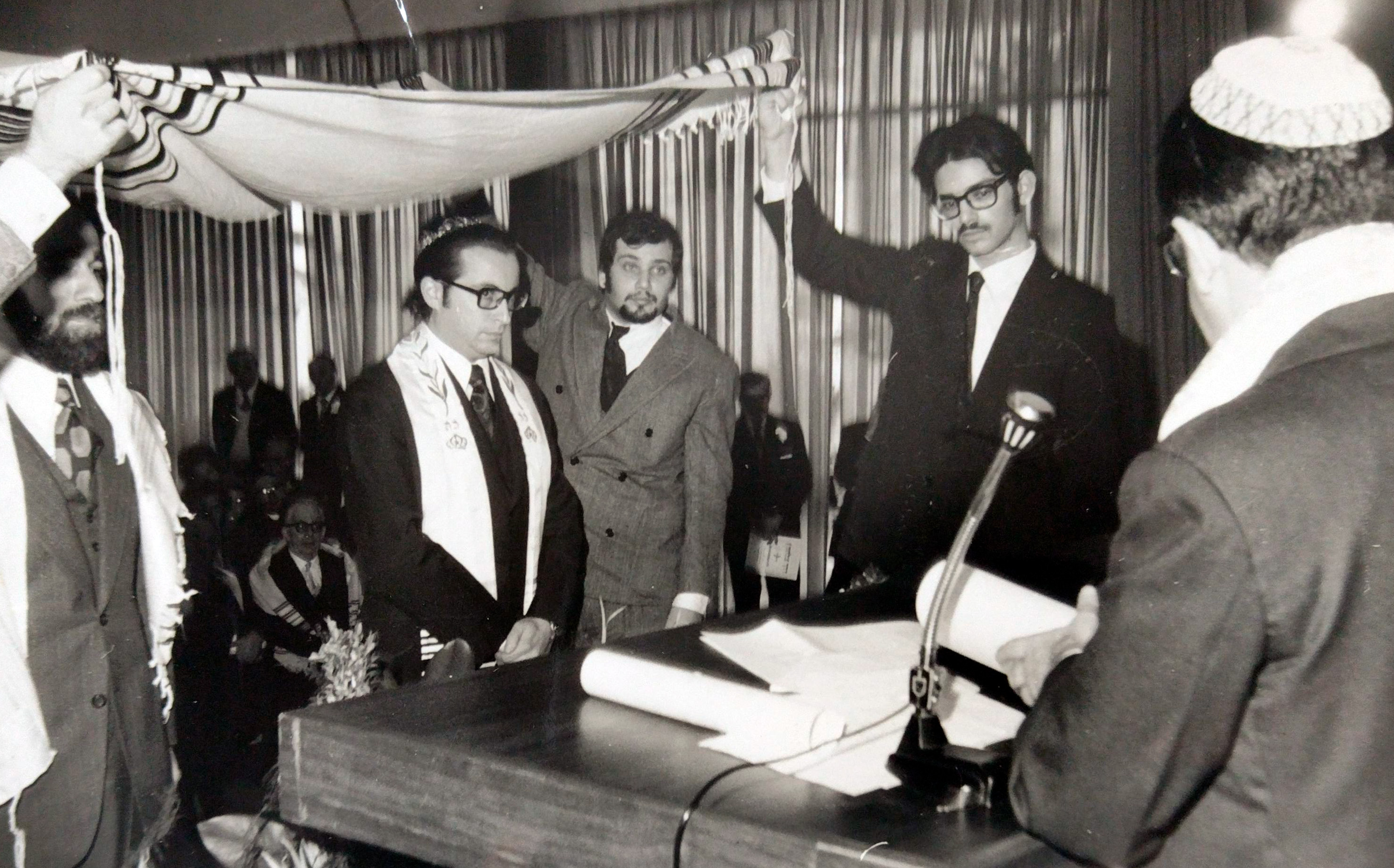
Rabbi Kreiman - Rabbinical Smikhah, First Graduated Rabbi, 1972

In 1972, he became the first Rabbi to be graduated from the Latin American Rabbinical Seminary in Buenos Aires.

He obtained a Doctorate in Law from the Barranquilla Section of the Free University of Colombia, having previously graduated as a lawyer from the University of Buenos Aires.

== Career ==
=== Chile ===
Kreiman arrived in Santiago, Chile, in 1972, where he served as Chief Rabbi of Chile for two decades. This period was full of challenges, particularly during the presidency of Salvador Allende (1970–73), and later, during the dictatorship of Augusto Pinochet (1973-1990). Despite the difficulties imposed by the socialist regime first, and then during the military dictatorship, Kreiman started religious equalitarian services, youth activities, summer camps, conferences, and cultural events even amidst protests.

During the dictatorship, he worked hard to support human rights; he was a founding member of the Committee of Cooperation for Peace in Chile (Comité Pro Paz), a human rights organization created in 1973 by the Christian churches together with the Jewish community to protect the life and physical integrity of people persecuted by the military dictatorship of Chile.

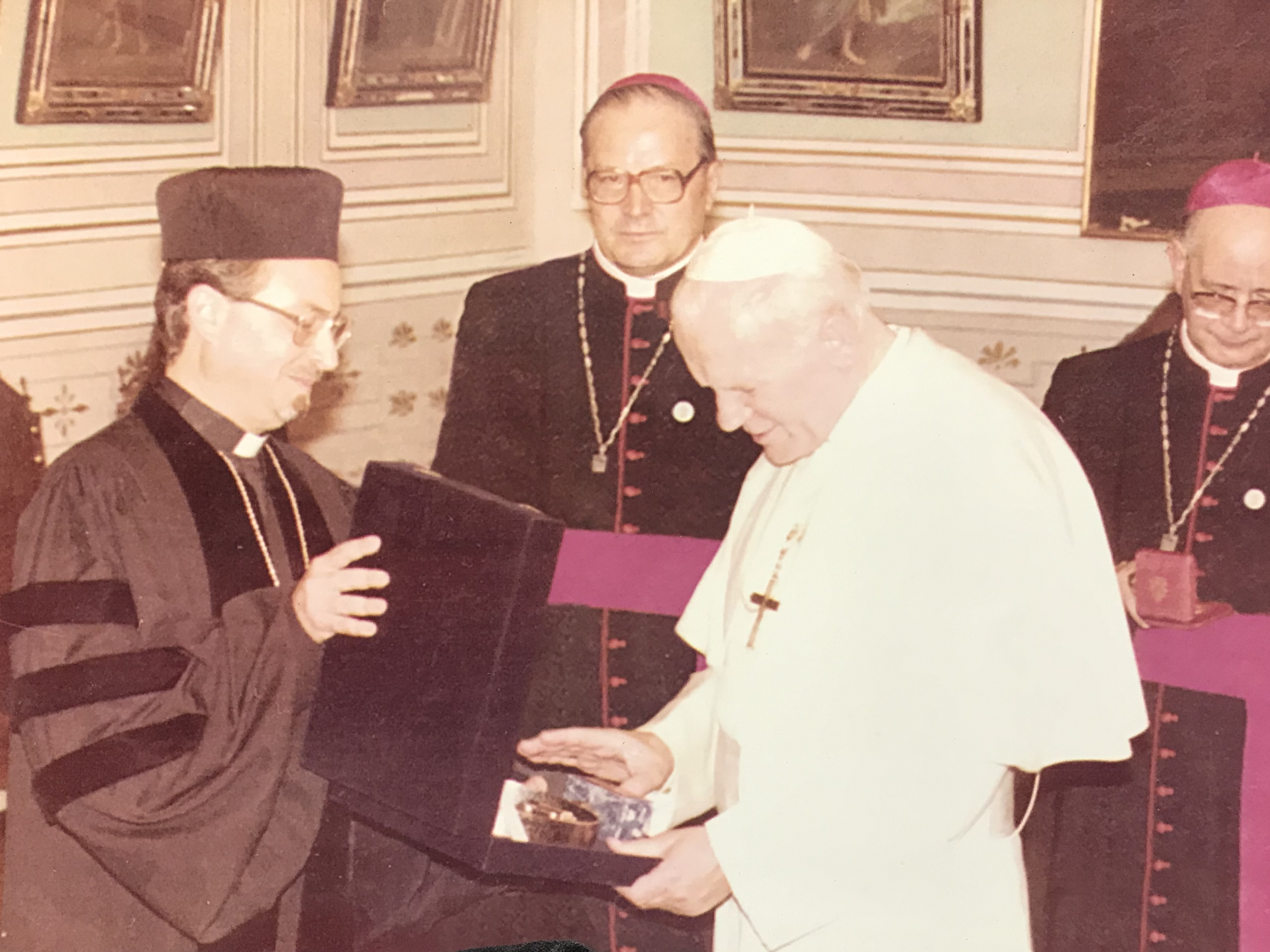
Rabbi Kreiman with Pope John Paul II (Chile 1987)

In 1989, he was awarded the Human Rights Award of the Chilean National Commission of Human Rights along with President Patricio Aylwin of Chile and Senator Edward Kennedy as well as the Rene Cassin Prize of International B’nai Brith for outstanding work in the field of human rights.

He was a fighter for equal rights, but at the same time, very traditional—he liked to lead the ceremonies dressed according to the way the rabbis were dressed in a kittel (religious robe) as in Europe.

=== Argentina ===
In early 1990, he left Chile, and returned to Buenos Aires, where he served as Chief Rabbi of the Templo Libertad, the Synagogue where he had celebrated his Bar Mitzvah and where, as a child, he had dreamed and decided to be a Rabbi.

In 1994, a powerful bomb shattered the AMIA building (Asociación Israelita Argentina) in Buenos Aires.). That terror attack changed his life forever. 85 victims were killed, among them was his wife Julia Susana Wolinsky.

In 1995 he returned to Chile, to the southern city of Concepción.

He was a Jewish chaplain in the Scouts of Argentina until 2012.

=== Israel ===
In 2012, Rabbi Kreiman made aliyah where he settled in Jerusalem, a couple of blocks away from the Great Synagogue, where he was admired and acknowledged for his presence, knowledge of the liturgy and the ability to create bonds. He walked different ideological paths and enjoyed the experience. During his last year, he formally approached Orthodoxy.

=== Interfaith activities ===
His commitment to interfaith activities was evident through his collaboration with Catholic organizations and his role as director of the International Council of Christians and Jews in Latin America, as well as international Vice President of the World Council of Synagogues.

Kreiman was close to Opus Dei, and participated in congresses in Buenos Aires and at the Pontifical University of the Holy Cross in Rome. According to Kreiman, Josemaría Escrivá's teachings are strongly rooted in Talmudic traditions about work. The Talmudic concept of work, said Kreiman, is that "work is not a punishment, but man's duty, a blessing from God that allows us to fully enjoy the Sabbath and allows us to be in the image and likeness of God".

Notably, in 1998 he was invited by King Hussein of Jordan, who warmly welcomed him as an honored guest, facilitating the commencement of the Judeo-Islamic dialogue in Latin America. Thousands of people listened to his sermons all around the world. They can be found at the archives of the Hebrew University.

== Personal life ==
Kreiman married Julia Susana ("Susy") Wolynski in 1969, and they had three daughters.

== Death ==
In January 2014, while visiting the Cauquenes Hot Springs in Chile, he began to feel unwell; he subsequently passed away at the Rancagua Hospital on January 5. Kreiman left three daughters, Marianella, Claudia, and Marcela, and six grandchildren.

He was buried in Buenos Aires, Argentina, next to his wife Julia Susana Wolinsky.

== Legacy ==
In 2015, the synagogue in Concepción, Chile, was renovated and reinaugurated under the name of Angel Kreiman. In 2016, a forest in Beit Shemesh, Israel, was inaugurated in memory of Angel Kreiman.

== Works ==
- Tesoros de La Tradicion Judia (May 1997)
