= Ann Brill =

American journalism academic

Ann Brill is the Dean of the William Allen White School of Journalism and Mass Communications at the University of Kansas.

== Career ==
Brill focuses her research work on how journalists are affected by the changes in media technology. Through her research, she has found that the developments in media technology have forced journalists to become adaptive and flexible in the ways that they work in turn causing them to be lifelong learners.

== Awards ==
- Nominated for University of Missouri Provost Outstanding Junior Faculty Teaching Award
- School of Journalism, 1996 and 1997
- Outstanding Faculty Member, University of Missouri Panhellic Council, 1997
- Profiled in University of Minnesota School of Journalism and Mass Communication Alumni Publication, 1995 Research

== Education ==
- B.A. Journalism, University of Wisconsin-Eau Claire
- M.A. Journalism, Marquette University
- Ph.D. Mass Communications, University of Minnesota
