= Alois Friedrich von Brühl =

Polish-Saxon diplomat and politician

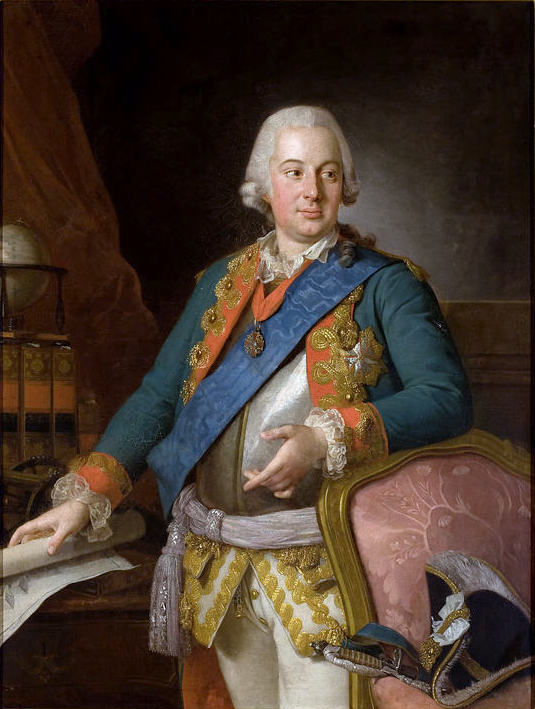
- Born: 31 July 1739; Dresden
- Died: 30 January 1793 (aged 53); Berlin

Alois Friedrich von Brühl (Polish: Alojzy Fryderyk Bruhl; 31 July 1739 Dresden – 30 January 1793 Berlin) was a Saxon-born diplomat, politician, Freemason, soldier, actor and playwright in the Polish–Lithuanian Commonwealth.

== Biography ==
He was the eldest son of minister Heinrich von Brühl, one of the advisors to King August II of Poland and member of the noble Brühl family. He was sent to the University of Leipzig, but his mother was not satisfied with the progress the much pampered minister's son was making there and sent him on to Leiden, where the foundation of his knowledge was laid. When he was 19, his father contrived to have him appointed as a general master of ordnance for the Polish crown, and he traveled through most of Europe without significant expenditure. During the Seven Years' War, he participated in several of the campaigns as a volunteer in the Army of the Holy Roman Empire.

With the death of king August III in 1763, he lost all his offices, and thereafter devoted his time to his passion for the theater: he wrote plays and performed on stage.

He was also briefly a governor of Warsaw. In that role, he founded the modern sewer system there.

== Works ==
- Theatralische Belustigungen, 5 Bände, 1785–1790

== Literature ==
- Johann Georg Meusel: Lexikon der vom Jahr 1750 bis 1800 verstorbenen teutschen Schriftsteller. Band 1, 1802. S. 625–627 (GBS)
- Hans von Krosigk: Karl Graf von Brühl, General-Intendant der Königlichen Schauspiele, später der Museen in Berlin und seine Eltern. Lebensbilder auf Grund der Handschriften des Archivs zu Seifersdorf. Mittler & Sohn, Berlin, 1910
- Juliusz Dudziak: Alojzy Fryderyk von Brühl (1739 - 1793), Zielona Góra, 2010
