= Carl Brühl =

Austrian physician and anatomist

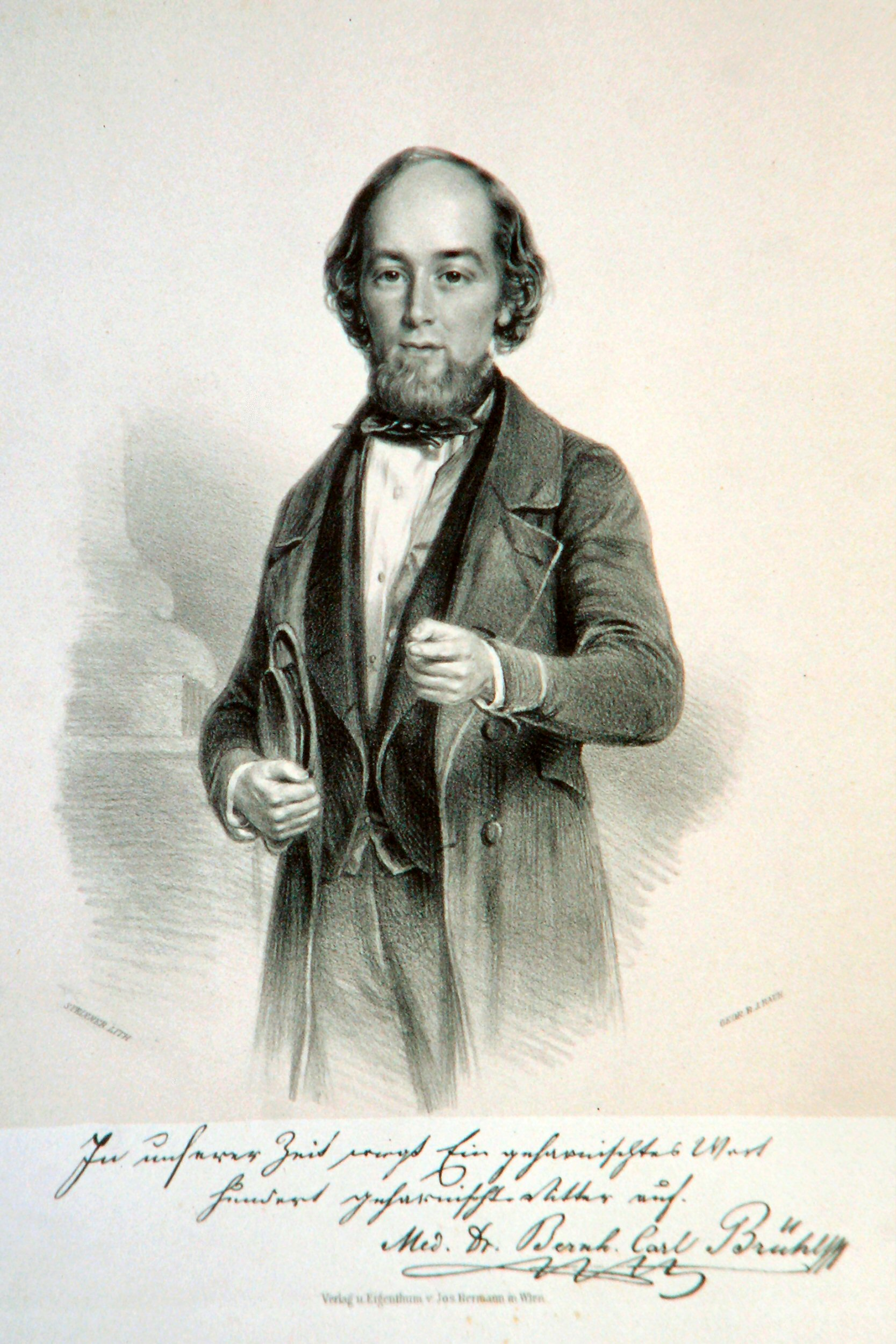
Carl Brühl (1820-1899)

Carl-Bernhard Brühl (5 May 1820, Prague – 14 August 1899, Graz) was an Austrian physician and anatomist known for his work in the field of comparative osteology.

He studied medicine in Vienna, later spending several years as a practicing physician. In 1857 he was appointed professor of zootomy and comparative anatomy in Kraków. In 1861 he became a professor of zootomy in Vienna, where in 1863, he was named director of the zootomic institute.

In Vienna, he conducted popular scientific lectures free of charge, a practice that was almost unheard of at the time. His lectures were also available to female listeners, causing a stir of serious controversy in academic circles. Sigmund Freud, in his 1925 autobiographical study, mentioned that it was hearing Brühl's reading of Goethe's "Die Natur" that persuaded him to enter medical school.

== Selected works ==
- Die Methode des osteologischen Details : dargestellt am Karpfen-skelette, 1845 - Method of osteological details; presentations of carp skeletons.
- Anfangsgründe der vergleichenden Anatomie aller Thierklassen, zum Selbststudium, 1847 - Basics of comparative anatomy in regards to all classes of animals.
- Zur Kenntniss des Orang-Kopfes und der Orangarten, 1856 - In regards to the knowledge of the orangutan head and the orangutan species.
- Das Skelet der Krokodilinen : dargestellt in zwanzig Tafeln zur Erleichterung des Selbststudiums, sammtlich nach der Natur gezeichnet, in Zink gestochen und erläutert, 1862 - The skeleton of crocodilians, etc.
- Zootomie aller Thierklassen für Lernende, nach Autopsien, skizzirt, 1874 - Zootomy of all animal classes, according to autopsies.
- Zur osteologie der knochenfische. Nach materialien aus dem pariser pflanzengarten, 1887 - Osteology of boned fish.
