= Brühl =

Brühl or Bruhl may refer to:

== Places ==
Germany

- Brühl (Rhineland), a town in North Rhine-Westphalia
  - Brühl station, a railway station
- Brühl (Baden), a town in Baden-Württemberg, near Mannheim
- Brühl (Leipzig), a street in Leipzig
- Brühl's Terrace, a historic architectural ensemble in Dresden

Poland

- Brühl Palace, Warsaw

== Other uses ==
- Brühl (surname)
- Brühl (family)
- Brühl train disaster, 2000 in Germany
- Höfe am Brühl, shopping mall in Leipzig, Germany
- SC Brühl, football club based in St. Gallen, Switzerland
- Stadion Brühl, football stadium at Grenchen in the Canton of Solothurn, Switzerland

== See also ==
- Brill (disambiguation)
- Bril (disambiguation)
