= Max Brüel =

Danish architect and musician

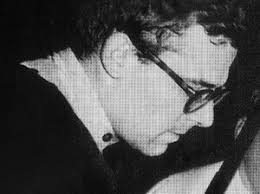
- Born: 14 July 1927; Hillerød, Denmark
- Died: 31 March 1995 (aged 67); Algarve, Portugal
- Occupations: Jazz musician, architect, pianist
- Spouse: Birgit Brüel (m. 1951; div. 1962) Elsebeth Brüel (m. 1966)
- Children: Sanne Brüel; Rebecca Brüel
- Parent(s): Axel Brüel; Lis Brüel
- Relatives: Charlotte Brüel (sister)

Max Brüel (14 July 1927 – 31 March 1995) was a Danish architect and jazz musician, and an accomplished pianist and saxophonist.

He is the designer of Denmark's tallest building, the Herlev Hospital in Copenhagen.

== See also ==
- List of Danish architects
