= Birgit Brüel =

Danish singer and actress

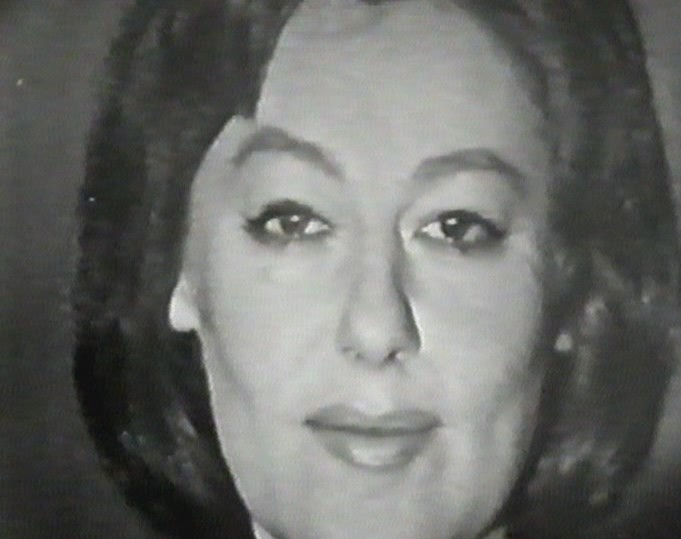

Background information
- Birth name: Birgit Thora Marie-Louise Thielemann
- Born: 6 October 1927; Copenhagen, Denmark
- Died: 23 February 1996 (aged 68); Gentofte, Denmark
- Genres: Jazz, pop
- Occupation: Singer
- Spouse: Max Brüel (m. 1951; div. 1962)

Birgit Brüel (6 October 1927 – 23 February 1996) was a Danish singer and actress who participated in the 1965 Eurovision Song Contest.

Brüel's professional career began in 1950 when she joined the Max Brüel Quartet as a jazz singer, and began training at the Danish Royal drama school. She married Brüel in 1951 and gave birth to twin daughters the following year (she also had one daughter from her first marriage, which had ended in divorce in 1949). During the 1950s she became well known as a theatre and screen actress, and between 1961 and 1966 she sang with the Danish Radio Jazz Group.

In 1965, Brüel entered the Danish Eurovision selection, Dansk Melodi Grand Prix, which she won with the song "For din skyld" ("For Your Sake"). She represented Denmark at the tenth Eurovision Song Contest, held on 20 March in Naples, where "For din skyld" finished in seventh place of the 18 entries. Oddly, the song was voted for by only two other countries, Sweden and Luxembourg, but both had awarded the maximum five points, giving it a relatively high placing.

Brüel combined singing and acting and made numerous television and film appearances up to the early 1990s. From the 1970s she became involved with Amazonegruppen, a feminist theatrical and musical group. Her last musical recording was Den hemmelige rude, a 1985 album consisting of poems by Tove Ditlevsen set to music.

Brüel died of undisclosed causes on 23 February 1996 at the age of 68.

Preceded by Bjørn Tidmand with Sangen om dig	Denmark in the Eurovision Song Contest; 1965	Succeeded by Ulla Pia with Stop - mens legen er go'
