= Heinrich von Brühl =

Polish-Saxon statesman (1700–1763)

Count Heinrich von Brühl
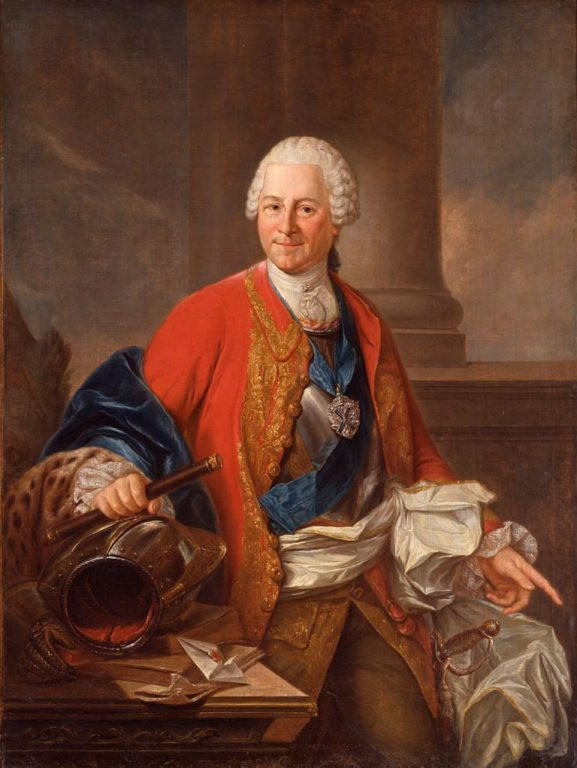
- Heinrich von Brühl in a Polish costume by Bacciarelli
- Born: Heinrich von Brühl; 13 August 1700; Gangloffsömmern
- Died: 28 October 1763 (aged 63); Dresden
- Occupations: Diplomat, statesman at the court of Saxony and the Polish–Lithuanian Commonwealth
- Spouse: Countess Franziska von Kolowrat-Krakowska
- Parent: Johann Moritz von Brühl

Heinrich, Count von Brühl (Polish: Henryk Brühl, 13 August 1700 – 28 October 1763), was a Polish-Saxon statesman at the court of Saxony and the Polish–Lithuanian Commonwealth and a member of the powerful German von Brühl family. The incumbency of this ambitious politician coincided with the decline of both states. Brühl was a skillful diplomat and cunning strategist, who managed to attain control over Saxony and Poland, partly by controlling its king, Augustus III, who ultimately could only be accessed through Brühl himself.

Polish historian and writer Józef Ignacy Kraszewski wrote a novel under the title Count Brühl, in which he described Heinrich as an oppressive and stubborn dictator, who, with greed, but also great determination, unsuccessfully attempted to gain control of the entire nation.

It is widely believed that Brühl had Europe's largest collection of watches and military vests; attributed to him was also a vast collection of ceremonial wigs, hats and the largest collection of Meissen porcelain in the world. He had also one of the biggest collection of kabbala books in Europe.

== Career ==
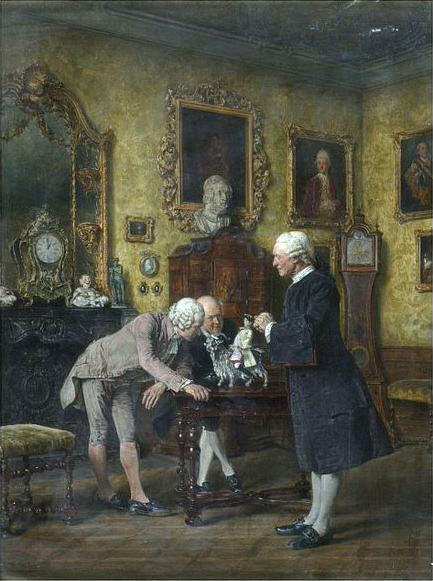
Count Brühl's Goat by Carl Seiler depicting Brühl showing off his extravagant Meissen porcelain. Victoria and Albert Museum

Brühl was born in Gangloffsömmern the son of Johann Moritz von Brühl, a noble who held the office of the Oberhofmarschall at the court of Saxe-Weissenfels (ruled by a cadet branch of the Albertine House of Wettin), by his first wife Erdmuth Sophie v. d. Heide. His father was ruined and compelled to part with his family estate, which passed into the hands of the prince. Under Duke Christian of Saxe-Weissenfels von Brühl was first placed as page with the dowager duchess, and was then received at her recommendation into the court of the Electorate of Saxony at Dresden as a Silberpage on 16 April 1719. He rapidly acquired the favour of the Elector Frederick Augustus I of Wettin, surnamed the Strong, who, in 1697, had been elected King of Poland (as Augustus II). Brühl was largely employed in procuring money for his extravagant master. He became Chief Receiver of Taxes and Minister of the Interior of Saxony in 1731.

He was at Warsaw when his master died in 1733, and obtained the confidence of the Prince-Elector Frederick Augustus II, who was at Dresden at the time, by acquiring the papers and jewels of his late father and bringing them promptly to his successor. Von Brühl raised money to secure the election of Frederick Augustus II as Polish king (Augustus III the Saxon), who in the following War of the Polish Succession prevailed against his rival Stanisław I.

During most of the thirty years of the ineffective reign of August III the Saxon, he was the major confidant of the king and the de facto head of the Saxon court. Reichsgraf since 27 November 1737, he had to acquiesce to the influence of old servants of the electoral house for a time, but after 1738 he was in effect sole minister, a position for which he actually had neither the skills nor the knowledge. The title of a Prime Minister was created for him in 1746, but as a classic court favourite his power extended beyond that office. Besides securing huge grants of land for himself, he acquired numerous titles, and he drew the combined salaries of these offices. He also worked closely with Bishop Kajetan Sołtyk of Kraków.

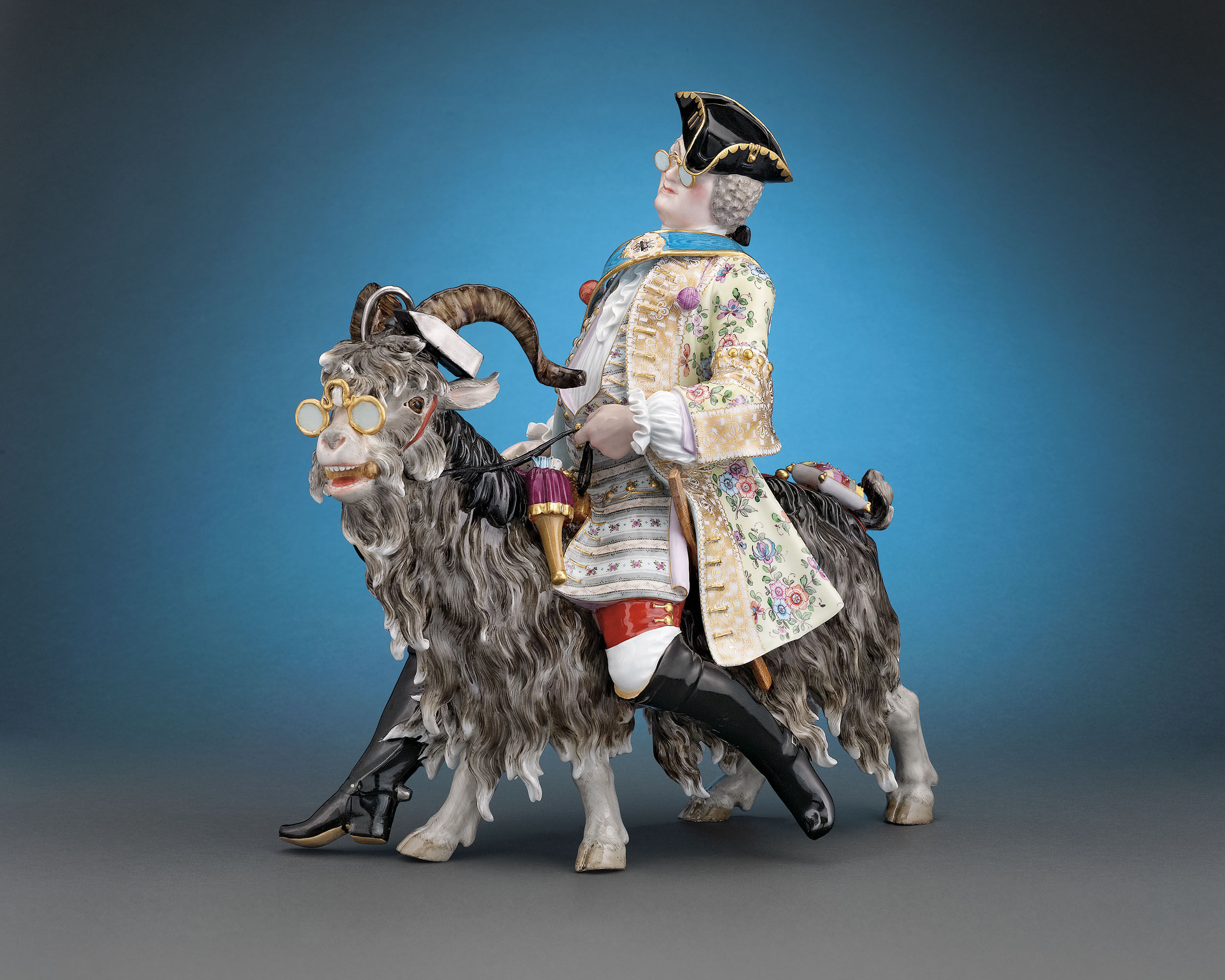
Count Brühl's Tailor on a Goat - satirical porcelain figure by Meissen

Brühl had cunning and skill sufficient to govern his master and get rid of his rivals and succeeded in keeping everybody at a distance from the king. No servant entered the king's service without the consent of Brühl, and even when the king went to the chapel all approach to him was prevented. A typical interaction of the king with Brühl has the king loitering about smoking, and asking, without looking at his favorite, "Brühl, have I any money?" "Yes, sire," was the continual answer, and to satisfy the king's demands, Brühl exhausted the state, plunged the country into debts and greatly reduced the army.

Brühl kept 200 domestics; his guards were better paid than those of the king himself, and his table more sumptuous. Frederick II said of him, "Brühl had more garments, watches, laces, boots, shoes and slippers, than any man of the age. Caesar would have counted him among those curled and perfumed heads which he did not fear."

== Politics ==
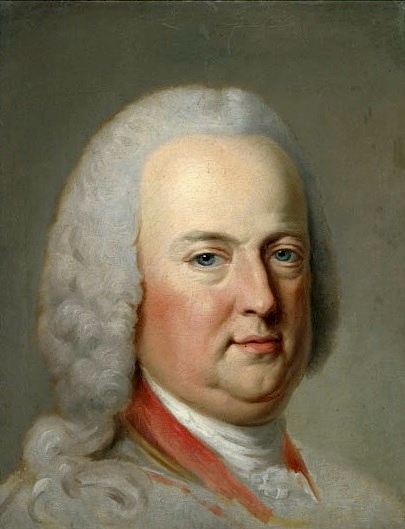
Heinrich von Brühl by Marcello Bacciarelli (1758-1763), National Museum in Warsaw

Brühl was a capable diplomat, who played a vital role in the Diplomatic Revolution of 1756 and the convergence of Habsburgs and France. However he was wholly responsible for a ruinous fiscal policy which decisively weakened the position of Saxony within the Holy Roman Empire between 1733 and 1763; for the mistaken ambition which led Frederick Augustus II to become a candidate for the throne of Poland, which led to a civil war and did unsustainable damage to the Polish sovereignty; for the engagements into which he entered in order to secure the support of Emperor Charles VI of Habsburg; for the shameless and ill-timed tergiversations of Saxony during the War of the Austrian Succession; for the intrigues which entangled the Electorate in the alliance against King Frederick II of Prussia, which led to the outbreak of the Seven Years' War; and for the waste and want of foresight which left the bankrupt country utterly unprepared to resist the immediate attack of the Prussian king.

At the beginning of the Seven Years' War the Saxon army comprised but 17,000 men. After a few weeks, the decimated army, under Frederick Augustus Rutowsky, was compelled to surrender at Pirna from want of the necessary supplies. The army was dissolved, while Saxony remained a war theatre.

Brühl was not only without political or military capacity, but was so garrulous that he could not keep a secret. His indiscretion was repeatedly responsible for the king of Prussia's discoveries of the plans laid against him. Nothing could shake the confidence of his master, which survived the ignominious flight into Bohemia, into which he was trapped by Brühl at the time of the Battle of Kesselsdorf, and all the miseries of the Seven Years' War. They fled with the pictures and the china, but the archives of the state were left to the victor.

The favourite abused the confidence of his master shamelessly. Not content with the 67,000 talers a month which he drew as salary for his innumerable offices, he was found when an inquiry was held in the next reign to have abstracted more than five million talers of public money for his private use. He left the work of the government offices to be done by his lackeys, whom he did not even supervise.

== Legacy ==
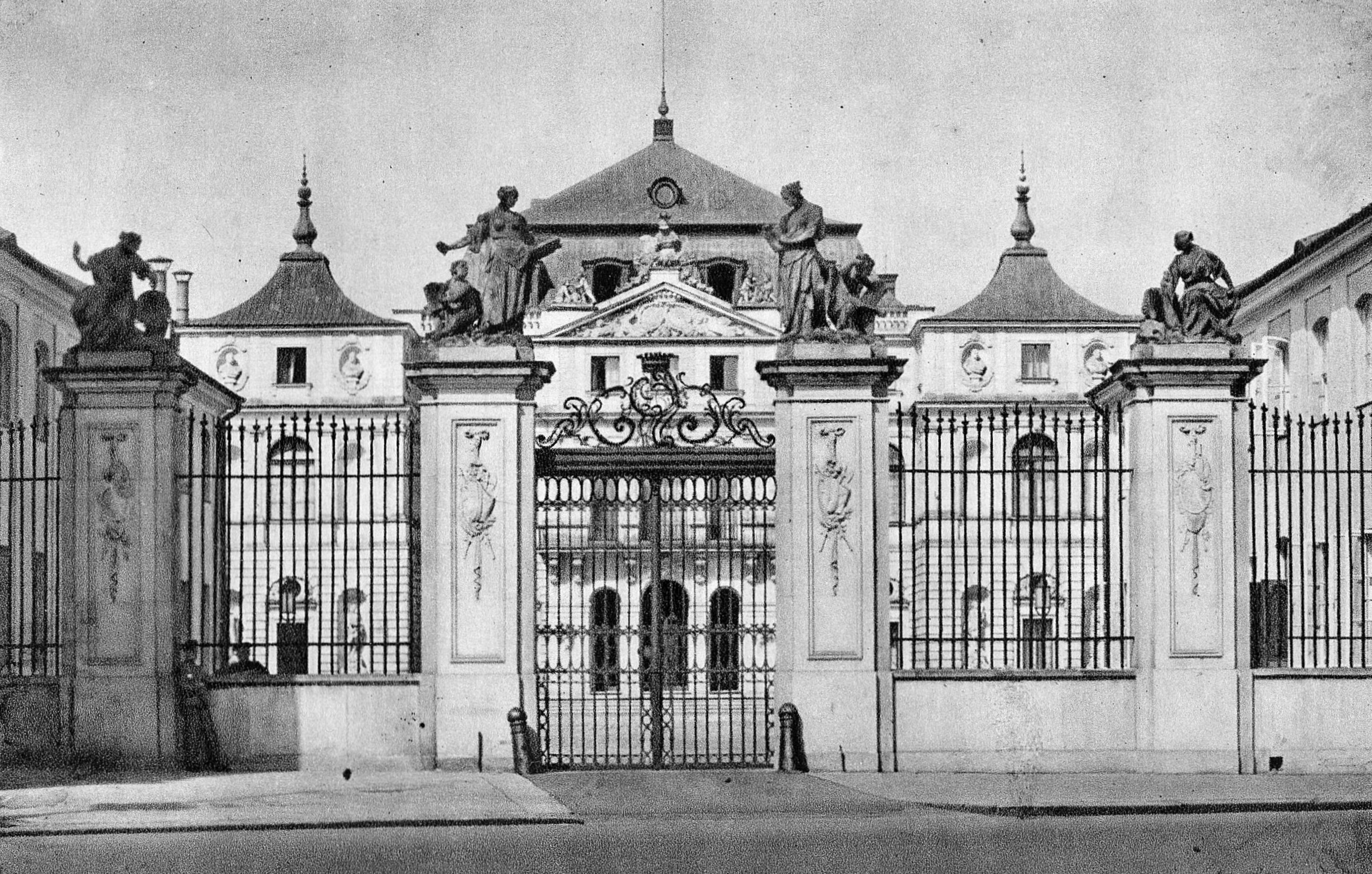
Brühl Palace in Warsaw, one of the largest palaces and one of the finest examples of rococo architecture in pre-war Poland

Brühl died at Dresden on 28 October 1763, having survived his master only for a few weeks. The new elector, Frederick Christian caused an inquiry to be held into his administration. His fortune including large palaces at Pförten (present-day Brody), Oberlichtenau and Wachau-Seifersdorf was found to amount to a million and a half talers, and was sequestered but afterwards restored to his family. The inquiry showed that Brühl owed his immense fortune to the prodigality of the king rather than to unlawful means of accumulation.

His profusion was often beneficial to the arts and sciences. The famous Meissen porcelain Swan Service was made for him, with over 2,200 pieces, now dispersed to collections around the world. The Meissen Fountain, largest assemblage of its kind, was also made for Brühl. In 1736 the architect Johann Christoph Knöffel had begun to build a city palace and terrace for the count on the bank of the Elbe in the heart of Dresden. This was originally called "Brühl's Garden" and is today known as Brühl's Terrace. The Brühl Palace at Warsaw was rebuilt according to the designs by Joachim Daniel von Jauch from 1754 to 1759. Brühl was a dedicated collector and protector of the arts - Francesco Algarotti called him a Maecenas. He owned a large gallery of pictures, which was bought by Empress Catherine II of Russia in 1768, and his library of 70,000 volumes was one of the biggest private libraries in the Holy Roman Empire.

Brühl was portrayed by Johannes Riemann in the 1941 film Friedemann Bach.

== Family ==
He married countess Franziska von Kolowrat-Krakowska on 29 April 1734. She was born into one of the most powerful noble houses of Bohemian origin and was a favourite of the wife of Frederick Augustus. Four sons and a daughter survived him. His eldest son, Alois Friedrich von Brühl, was also a Saxon politician, and a soldier and dramatist as well. His daughter Maria Amalia married Polish count, Jerzy August Mniszech of Dukla. His youngest son, Hans Moritz von Brühl (1746–1811), was before the Revolution of 1789 a colonel in the French service, and afterwards general inspector of roads in Brandenburg and Pomerania. By his wife Margarethe Schleierweber, the daughter of a French corporal, and renowned for her beauty and intellectual gifts, he was the father of Carl von Brühl who as intendant-general of the Prussian royal theatres was of some importance in the history of the development of drama in Germany. Another granddaughter was Marie von Brühl, who married Carl von Clausewitz.

Heinrich von Brühl also had a nephew named Hans Moritz von Brühl, the same as that of his youngest son. The nephew was a diplomat and astronomer, and lived much of his life in England.

== See also ==
- Nicholas Repnin
- Count Wenzel Anton Kaunitz-Rietberg
- Brühl (disambiguation)
