= Military strategy =

Use of force or threat of war focused for political purposes

Military strategy is a set of ideas implemented by military organizations to pursue desired strategic goals. Derived from the Greek word strategos, the term strategy, when first used during the 18th century, was seen in its narrow sense as the "art of the general", or "the art of arrangement" of troops. and deals with the planning and conduct of campaigns.

The father of Western modern strategic studies, Carl von Clausewitz (1780–1831), defined military strategy as "the employment of battles to gain the end of war." B. H. Liddell Hart's definition put less emphasis on battles, defining strategy as "the art of distributing and applying military means to fulfill the ends of policy". Hence, both gave the preeminence to political aims over military goals.

Sun Tzu (544–496 BC) is often considered as the father of Eastern military strategy, who greatly influenced historical Chinese, Japanese, Korean and Vietnamese modern war tactics. The Art of War by Sun Tzu grew in popularity and saw practical use in Western society as well. It continues to influence many competitive endeavors in Asia, Europe, and America regarding military and political affairs. The Eastern military strategy differs from the Western by focusing more on asymmetric warfare and deception. Chanakya's Arthashastra has been an important strategic and political compendium in Indian and Asian history as well.

== Fundamentals ==
Military strategy is the planning and execution of the contest between groups of armed adversaries. It is a subdiscipline of warfare and of foreign policy, and a principal tool to secure national interests. Its perspective is larger than military tactics, which involve the disposition and maneuver of units on a particular sea or battlefield, but less broad than grand strategy (or "national strategy"), which is the overarching strategy of the largest of organizations such as the nation state, confederation, or international alliance and involves using diplomatic, informational, military and economic resources. Military strategy involves using military resources such as people, equipment, and information against the opponent's resources to gain supremacy or reduce the opponent's will to fight, developed through the precepts of military science.

NATO's definition of strategy is "presenting the manner in which military power should be developed and applied to achieve national objectives or those of a group of nations." Field Marshal Viscount Alanbrooke, Chief of the Imperial General Staff and co-chairman of the Anglo-US Combined Chiefs of Staff Committee for most of the Second World War, described the art of military strategy as: "to derive from the [policy] aim a series of military objectives to be achieved: to assess these objectives as to the military requirements they create, and the preconditions which the achievement of each is likely to necessitate: to measure available and potential resources against the requirements and to chart from this process a coherent pattern of priorities and a rational course of action." Field-Marshal Montgomery summed it up thus "Strategy is the art of distributing and applying military means, such as armed forces and supplies, to fulfill the ends of policy. Tactics means the dispositions for, and control of, military forces and techniques in actual fighting. Put more shortly: strategy is the art of the conduct of war, tactics the art of fighting."

=== Background ===
Military strategy in the 19th century was still viewed as one of a trivium of "arts" or "sciences" that govern the conduct of warfare; the others being tactics, the execution of plans and maneuvering of forces in battle, and logistics, the maintenance of an army. The view had prevailed since the Roman times, and the borderline between strategy and tactics at this time was blurred, and sometimes categorization of a decision is a matter of almost personal opinion. Carnot, during the French Revolutionary Wars thought it simply involved concentration of troops.

As French statesman Georges Clemenceau said, "War is too important a business to be left to soldiers." This gave rise to the concept of the grand strategy which encompasses the management of the resources of an entire nation in the conduct of warfare. On this issue Clausewitz stated that a successful military strategy may be a means to an end, but it is not an end in itself.

== Principles ==
Military stratagem in the Maneuver against the Romans by Cimbri and Teutons circa 100 B.C.

Many military strategists have attempted to encapsulate a successful strategy in a set of principles. Sun Tzu defined 13 principles in his The Art of War while Napoleon listed 115 maxims. American Civil War General Nathan Bedford Forrest had only one: to "[get] there first with the most men". The concepts given as essential in the United States Army Field Manual of Military Operations (FM 3–0) are:

- Objective type (direct every military operation towards a clearly defined, decisive, and attainable objective)
- Offensive type (seize, retain, and exploit the initiative)
- Mass Type (concentrate combat power at the decisive place and time)
- Economy of force type (allocate minimum essential combat power to secondary efforts)
- Maneuver type (place the enemy in a disadvantageous position through the flexible application of combat power)
- Unity of command type (for every objective, ensure unity of effort under one responsible commander)
- Security type (never permit the enemy to acquire an unexpected advantage)
- Surprise type (strike the enemy at a time, at a place, or in a manner for which they are unprepared)
- Simplicity type (prepare clear, uncomplicated plans and clear, concise orders to ensure thorough understanding)

According to Greene and Armstrong, some planners assert adhering to the fundamental principles guarantees victory, while others claim war is unpredictable and the strategist must be flexible. Others argue predictability could be increased if the protagonists were to view the situation from the other sides in a conflict.

== Development ==
=== Antiquity ===
The principles of military strategy emerged at least as far back as 500 BC in the works of Sun Tzu and Chanakya. The campaigns of Alexander the Great, Chandragupta Maurya, Hannibal, Qin Shi Huang, Julius Caesar, Zhuge Liang, Khalid ibn al-Walid and, in particular, Cyrus the Great demonstrate strategic planning and movement.

Early strategies included the strategy of annihilation, exhaustion, attrition warfare, scorched earth action, blockade, guerrilla campaign, deception and feint. Ingenuity and adeptness were limited only by imagination, accord, and technology. Strategists continually exploited ever-advancing technology. The word "strategy" itself derives from the Greek "στρατηγία" (strategia), "office of general, command, generalship", in turn from "στρατηγός" (strategos), "leader or commander of an army, general", a compound of "στρατός" (stratos), "army, host" + "ἀγός" (agos), "leader, chief", in turn from "ἄγω" (ago), "to lead".

=== Middle Ages ===
Through maneuver and continuous assault, Chinese, Persian, Arab and Eastern European armies were stressed by the Mongols until they collapsed, and were then annihilated in pursuit and encirclement.

=== Early modern era ===
In 1520, Niccolò Machiavelli's Dell'arte della guerra (Art of War) dealt with the relationship between civil and military matters and the formation of grand strategy. In the Thirty Years' War (1618-1648), Gustavus Adolphus of Sweden demonstrated advanced operational strategy that led to his victories on the soil of the Holy Roman Empire. It was not until the 18th century that military strategy was subjected to serious study in Europe. The word was first used in German as "Strategie" in a translation of Leo VI's Tactica in 1777 by Johann von Bourscheid. From then onwards, the use of the word spread throughout the West.

=== Napoleonic ===
==== Waterloo ====
Map of the Waterloo campaign

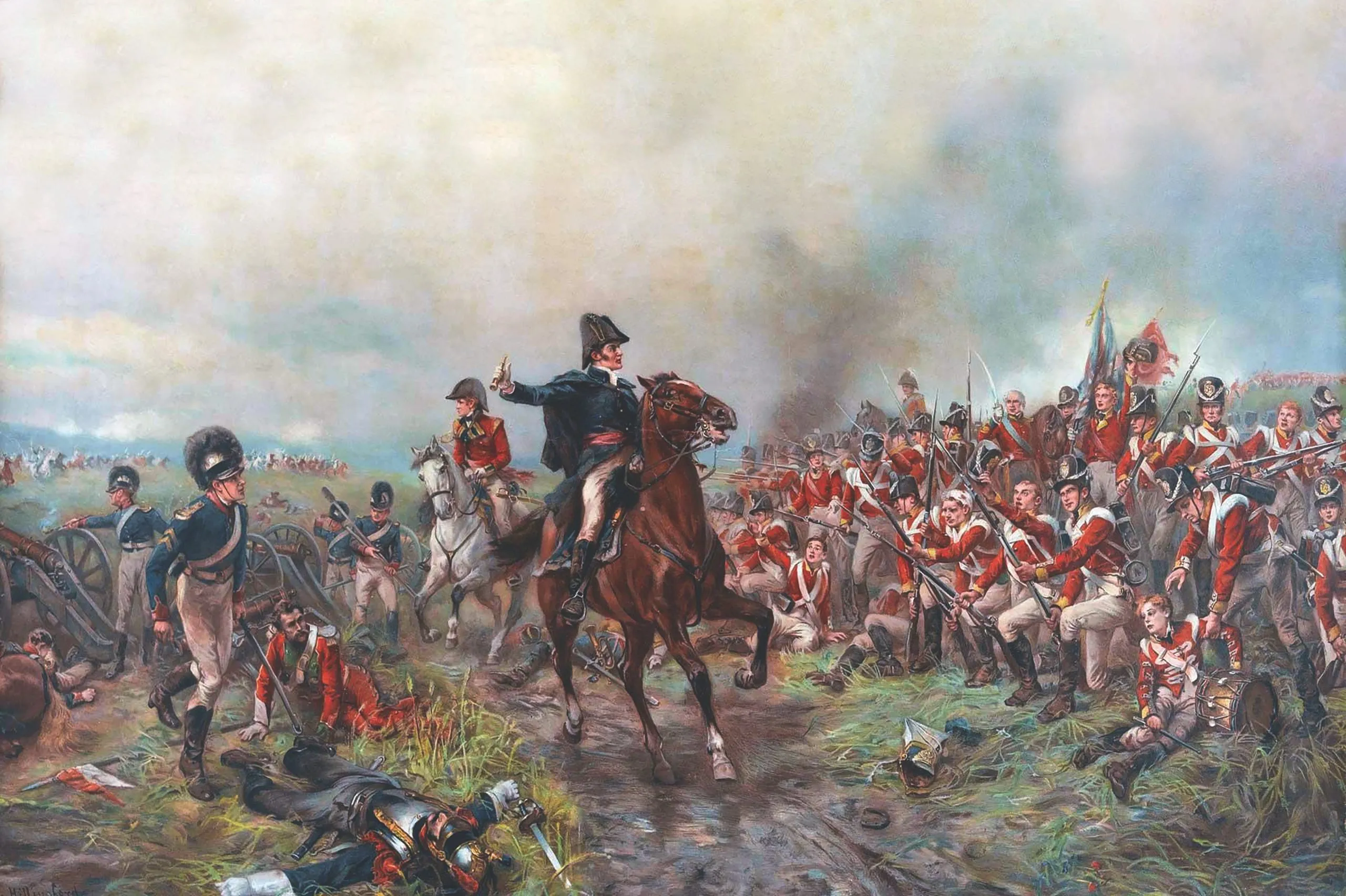
Wellington at Waterloo by Robert Alexander Hillingford

=== Clausewitz and Jomini ===
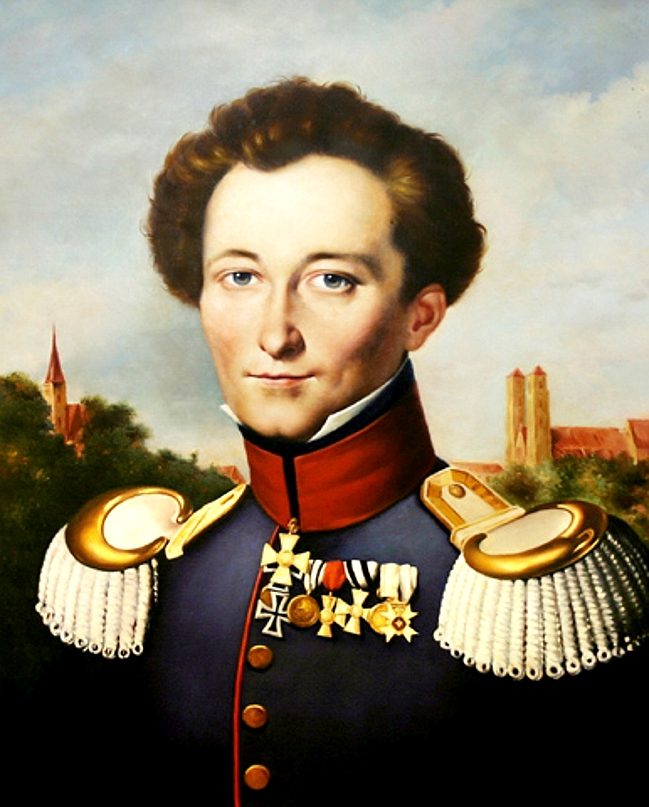
Carl von Clausewitz

Clausewitz's On War has become a famous reference for strategy, dealing with political, as well as military, leadership, his most famous assertion being:

"War is not merely a political act, but also a real political instrument, a continuation of policy by other means."

Clausewitz saw war first and foremost as a political act, and thus maintained that the purpose of all strategy was to achieve the political goal that the state was seeking to accomplish. As such, Clausewitz famously argued that war was the "continuation of politics by other means". Clausewitz and Jomini are widely read by US military personnel.

=== Interwar ===
Technological change had an enormous effect on strategy, but little effect on leadership. The use of telegraph and later radio, along with improved transport, enabled the rapid movement of large numbers of men. One of Germany's key enablers in mobile warfare was the use of radios, where these were put into every tank. However, the number of men that one officer could effectively control had, if anything, declined. The increases in the size of the armies led to an increase in the number of officers. Although the officer ranks in the US Army did swell, in the German army the ratio of officers to total men remained steady.

=== World War II ===
Interwar Germany had as its main strategic goals the reestablishment of Germany as a European great power and the complete annulment of the Versailles treaty of 1919. After Adolf Hitler and the Nazi party took power in 1933, Germany's political goals also included the accumulation of Lebensraum ("Living space") for the Germanic "race" and the elimination of communism as a political rival to Nazism. The destruction of World Jewry, while not strictly a strategic objective, was a political goal of the Nazi regime linked to the vision of a German-dominated Europe, and especially to the Generalplan Ost for a depopulated east which Germany could colonize.

=== Cold War ===
Soviet strategy in the Cold War was dominated by the desire to prevent, at all costs, the recurrence of an invasion of Russian soil. The Soviet Union nominally adopted a policy of no first use, which in fact was a posture of launch on warning. Other than that, the USSR adapted to some degree to the prevailing changes in the NATO strategic policies that are divided by periods as:

- Strategy of massive retaliation (1950s) (Russian: стратегия массированного возмездия)
- Strategy of flexible reaction (1960s) (Russian: стратегия гибкого реагирования)
- Strategies of realistic threat and containment (1970s) (Russian: стратегия реалистического устрашения или сдерживания)
- Strategy of direct confrontation (1980s) (Russian: стратегия прямого противоборства) one of the elements of which became the new highly effective high-precision targeting weapons.
- Strategic Defense Initiative (also known as "Star Wars") during its 1980s development (Russian: стратегическая оборонная инициатива – СОИ) which became a core part of the strategic doctrine based on Defense containment.

All-out nuclear World War III between NATO and the Warsaw Pact did not take place. The United States recently (April 2010) acknowledged a new approach to its nuclear policy which describes the weapons' purpose as "primarily" or "fundamentally" to deter or respond to a nuclear attack.

=== Post–Cold War ===
Strategy in the post Cold War is shaped by the global geopolitical situation: a number of potent powers in a multipolar array which has arguably come to be dominated by the hyperpower status of the United States.

Parties to conflict which see themselves as vastly or temporarily inferior may adopt a strategy of "hunkering down" – witness Iraq in 1991 or Yugoslavia in 1999.

The major militaries of today are usually built to fight the "last war" (previous war) and hence have huge armored and conventionally configured infantry formations backed up by air forces and navies designed to support or prepare for these forces.

=== Netwar ===
A main point in asymmetric warfare is the nature of paramilitary organizations such as Al-Qaeda which are involved in guerrilla military actions but which are not traditional organizations with a central authority defining their military and political strategies. Organizations such as Al-Qaeda may exist as a sparse network of groups lacking central coordination, making them more difficult to confront following standard strategic approaches. This new field of strategic thinking is tackled by what is now defined as netwar.

== See also ==
General

- Geopolitics
- Strategy
- Grand strategy
- Naval strategy
- Operational mobility
- Military doctrine
- Principles of war
- Military tactics
  - List of military tactics
- List of military strategies and concepts
- List of military writers
  - List of military strategy books
- Roerich Pact

Examples of military strategies

- Schlieffen Plan
- Mutual assured destruction
- Blitzkrieg
- Choke point
- Shock and awe
- Fabian strategy
- Progressive war

Related topics

- Asymmetric warfare
- Basic Strategic Art Program
- Battleplan (documentary TV series)
- Force multiplication
- Strategic bombing
- Strategic depth
- U.S. Army Strategist
- War termination
