= Basic Strategic Art Program =

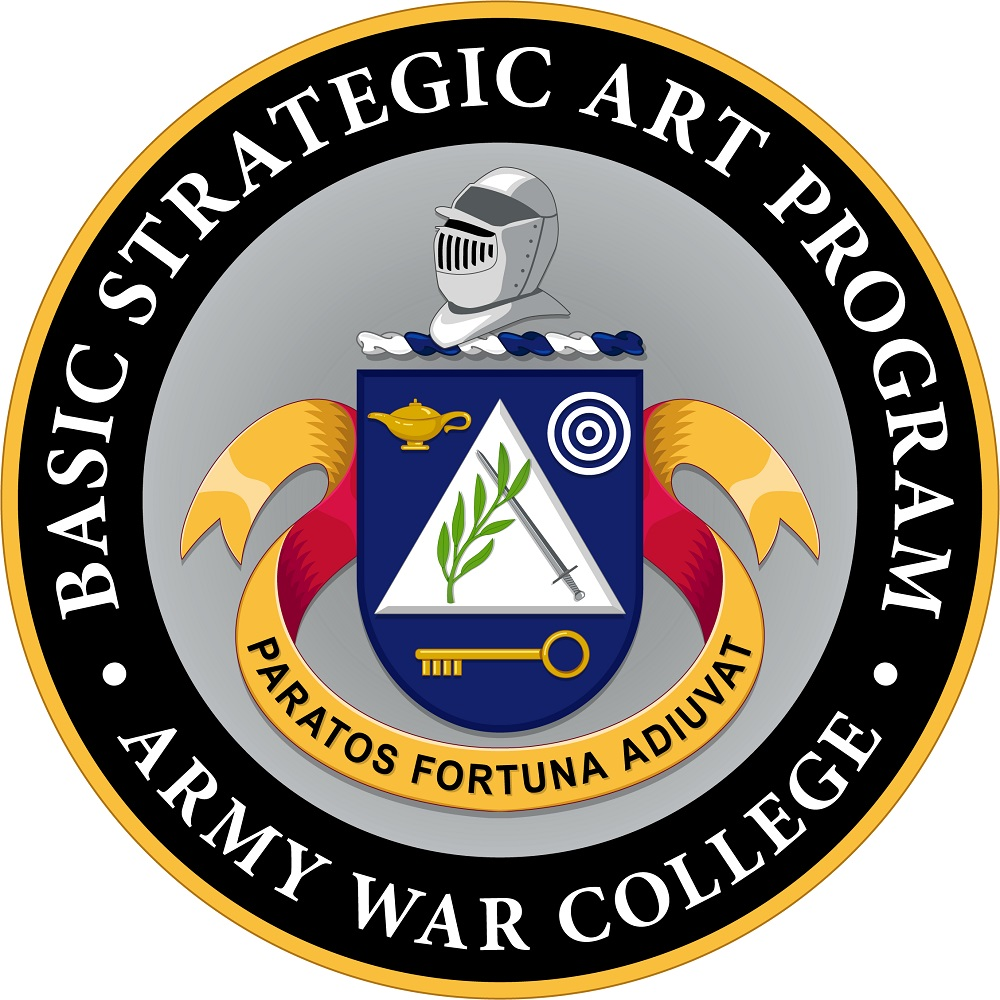
- Seal of the Basic Strategic Art Program
- Carlisle Barracks, PA; United States

Information
- Motto: Paratos fortuna adiuvat (Fortune favors the prepared)
- Established: 2003
- Authority: United States Army War College
- Director: Colonel Francis Park, U.S. Army
- Website: https://ssl.armywarcollege.edu/dmspo/bsap/

The Basic Strategic Art Program (BSAP) is an academic program taught at the U.S. Army War College at Carlisle Barracks, Pennsylvania. The course was designed to support the educational requirements for Functional Area FA59 (FA59), U.S. Army Strategist, formerly called Strategic Plans and Policy. The first course began in 2003 and the school continues to teach three 16-week courses per year.

The course provides most new Army Strategists, who transition from a different U.S. Army basic branch, with a foundation in strategic theory and practice. It helps officers connect their early tactical experiences with the challenges of operating in the strategic environment. The course, which includes various staff rides and modules, is taught to rigorous academic standards. Failure to achieve these standards is cause for disenrollment from the program and removal from the functional area.

== Origins ==
In September 2001, Army leaders in coordination with various senior service colleges such as the Army War College and National Defense University "convened a workshop to determine the competencies and educational requirements for Army strategists". The attendees identified the functional area's "skills, knowledge, and attributes" and designed the resulting BSAP course to support them.

In January 2002, the Army G-3 directed the Commandant of the Army War College to develop a basic qualification course for Functional Area 59. The G-3 approved the BSAP concept in July 2002. The pilot course was conducted 16 June to 17 September 2003, graduating seven in its plankholder class.

By 2006, the course grew to two classes per year and by 2008 had grown to three classes per year. Its first civilian interagency graduate in 2009 marked an effort to diversify the course.

A 2010 analysis by the BSAP Director at the time, LTC Charles P. Moore, noted that U.S. Army strategists, in a relatively new career field at the time, had dissimilar experiences and a "degraded sense of identity and commonality" because not all new 59s were able to attend BSAP. Moore stated that, "In time, all strategists will share a common BSAP experience, strengthening their commonality and collective identity" although noting that BSAP cannot accomplish the latter alone.

== Purpose ==
According to the U.S. Army War College's Department of Military Strategy, Planning, and Operations,

BSAP provides officers newly designated into Functional Area (FA) 59 (Strategist) an introduction to strategy and to the unique skills, knowledge, and behaviors that provide the foundation for their progressive development as Army strategists. BSAP also creates a shared common foundational experience for Army strategists, acculturates officers to the functional area, and assists graduates in the creation of their FA59 self-identity as part of a network of Army FA59 strategists.

== Curriculum ==
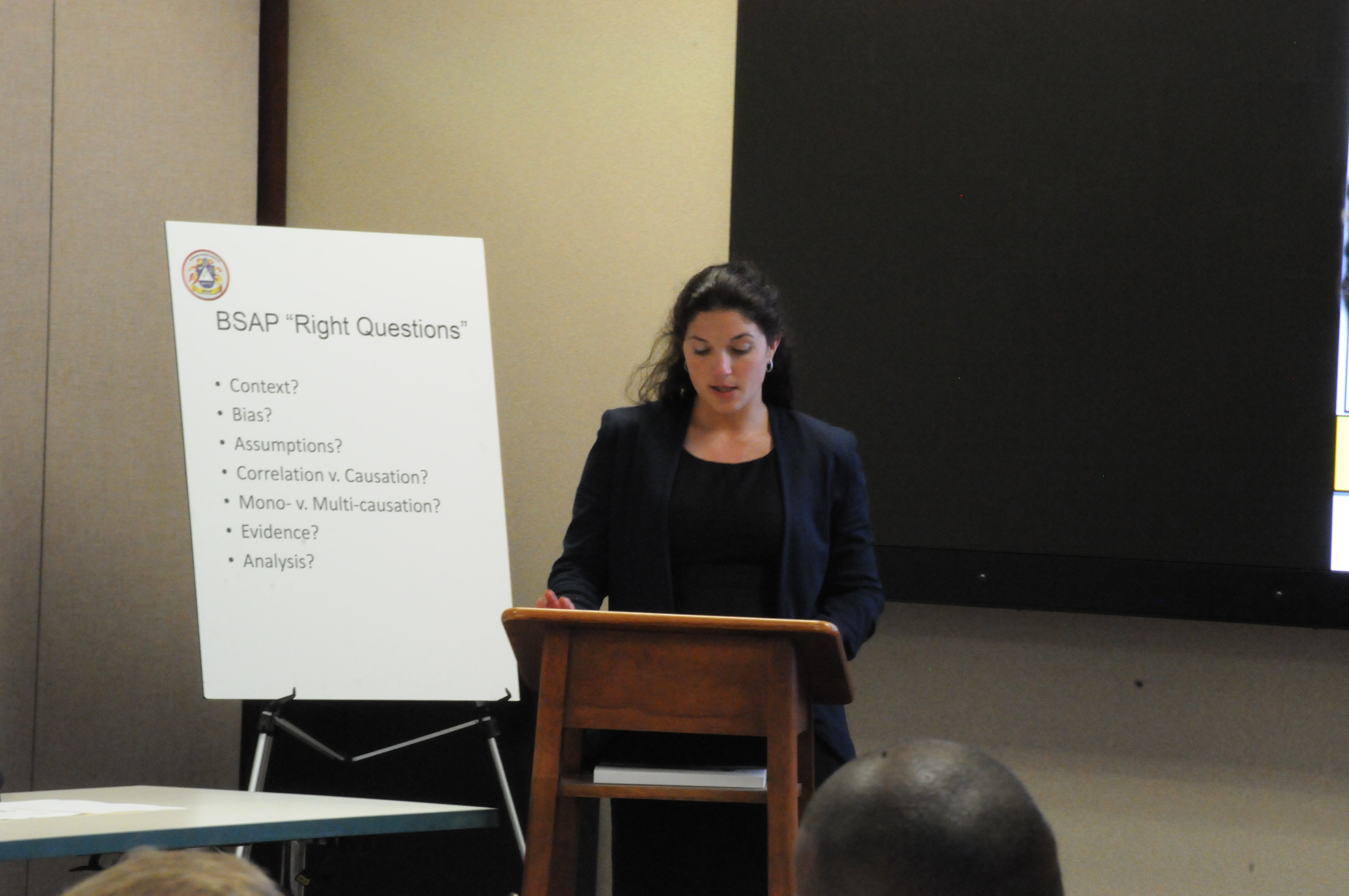
Student brief during the course in August 2021.

Faculty from across the U.S. Army War College support BSAP, which also draws from world class academic and professional guest speakers and lecturers. There are three 16-week courses annually, Jan–Apr, May–Aug, and Sep–Dec. The course includes staff rides or visits, including a trip to Washington D.C. to visit U.S. government interagency organizations. There is a staff ride of U.S. Grant's 1864 Overland Campaign at the conclusion of the course. Students share experiences with those of the Advanced Strategic Art Program, the U.S. Army War College resident program, and other Senior Service Colleges.

In 2018, the BSAP curriculum comprised the following six modules: strategic theory, strategic art, national security decision-making, contemporary strategic challenges, institutional strategy and planning, and joint and Army planning. Using the graduate seminar method, the course combines history, theory, exercises, guest lectures, and staff rides to develop a 'rich professional perspective on policy, strategy, and doctrine.

=== Modules ===
The first BSAP module is Strategic Theory, which allows students to "evaluate doctrine and strategy". Students consider military classics by authors such as Sun Tzu and Clausewitz. The course also considers modern strategic theory related to service and joint doctrine as well as strategic culture and practical application of theory.

In the Strategic Art module, students study campaigns including the Peloponnesian Wars and the global war on terrorism. Topics of discussion include: "strategy and policy match, theories of victory, mirror imaging, civil-military relations, pre-war plans and wartime realities, and coalition warfare".

The National Security and Decision-making module focuses on decision-making and organization within the executive branch of the U.S. government, including real-world case studies and a trip to Washington D.C. for U.S. government interagency visits including the Central Intelligence Agency, National Security Council, State Department, and others.

In the Contemporary Strategic Challenges module, students learn about homeland security as well as conduct regional studies related to Northeast Asia, Southwest Asia, Western Hemisphere, and Europe.

The Institutional Strategy module centers on the U.S. Army related to resources, force management, readiness, and transformation. In the Joint and Army Planning module, students learn about campaign planning with U.S. Army forces and landpower in a broader strategic context.

== Reading List ==
- Accidental Guerilla: Fighting Small Wars in the Midst of a Big One, David Kilcullen
- American Civil - Military Relations, Edited by Suzanne C. Nielsen and Don M. Snider
- American Politics: Classic and Contemporary Readings, Allan C. Cigler
- American Way of War, Russell F. Weigley
- And Keep Moving On, Mark Grimsley
- Art of War by Sun Tzu, trans. by Samuel Griffith
- Asking the Right Questions: A Guide to Critical Thinking, M Neil Browne and Stuart Keeley
- Bombing to Win: Air Power and Coercion in War, Robert A. Pape
- Bureaucracy: What Government Agencies Do and Why They Do It, James Q. Wilson
- Carrying the War to the Enemy: American Operational Art to 1945, Michael R. Matheny
- Cobra II, Michael Gordon and Bernard Trainor
- Congress: The Electoral Connection, David Mayhew
- Centers of Gravity and Critical Vulnerabilities, Perspectives on Warfighting, Dr. Joseph Strange
- Confederate War, Gary W. Gallagher
- Conflict After the Cold War, Richard K. Betts
- Counterinsurgency in Modern Warfare, Daniel Marston and Carter Malkasian
- Dereliction of Duty, H.R. McMaster
- Elements of Style, William Strunk and E.B. White
- Essence of Decision: Explaining the Cuban Missile Crisis, Graham T. Allison and Philip Zelikow
- Fighting Talk: Forty Maxims on War, Peace, and Strategy, Colin S. Gray
- Franco-Prussian War: The German Conquest of France in 1870–1871, Geoffery Wawro
- Grand Strategies in War and Peace edited by Paul Kennedy
- Grand Strategy of the Roman Empire, Edward N. Luttwak
- Great Civil War: A Military and Political History 1861–1865, Russell F. Weigley
- Landmark Thucydides R.B. Stassler
- The Lexus and the Olive Tree, Thomas L. Friedman
- Making of Peace: Rulers, States, and the Aftermath of War, Williamson Murray
- Making of Strategy: Rulers, States, and War, Williamson Murray, MacGregor Knox, Alvin Bernstein
- Modern Strategy, Colin S. Gray
- Obama's Wars, Bob Woodward
- On Point: US Army in Operation Iraqi Freedom, Gregory Fontenot, E.J. Degen, David Tohn
- On Point II : the United States Army in Operation Iraqi Freedom, May 2003 – Jan 2005 : Transition to the New Campaign, Donald P. Wright
- On War, Carl von Clausewitz
- Paths of Heaven, Evolution of Airpower Theory, Phillip S. Meilinger
- Patterns of War Since the Eighteenth Century, Larry H. Addington
- Peace to End all Peace: The Fall of the Ottoman Empire and the Creation of the Modern Middle East, David Fromkin
- Plan of Attack, Bob Woodward
- Selected Military Writings of Mao Tse-Tung, Mao Tse-tung
- Spanish Ulcer: A History of the Peninsular War, David Gates
- Strategy and Power in Russia 1600–1914, William C. Fuller, Jr.
- Strategy in the Contemporary World, John Baylis, James Wirtz, Eliot Cohen, Colin Gray
- Supreme Command, Eliot A. Cohen
- Thinking in Time: The Uses of History for Decisionmakers, Neustadt and May
- This Mighty Scourge: Perspectives on the Civil War, James McPherson
- The Endgame: The Inside Story of the Struggles for Iraq, from George Bush to Barack Obama, Gordon and Trainor
- The Tragedy of Great Power Politics, John Mearsheimer
- Transformation of War, Martin Van Creveld
- Transforming an Army at War: Designing the Modular Force, 1993–2005, William M. Donnelly
- War, Peace and International Relations: An Introduction to Strategic History, Colin S. Gray
- War Within: A Secret White House History 2006–2008, Bob Woodward
- Why the Allies Won, Richard J. Overy

== See also ==
- School of Advanced Military Studies
- U.S. Army Strategist

== Bibliography ==
- Basic Strategic Art Program official site
- The Strategic Plans and Policy Officer in the Modular Division -- Military Review
- What’s the Matter with Being a Strategist? -- Parameters
- What’s the Matter with Being a Strategist (Now)? -- Parameters
