= Strategic studies =

Interdisciplinary academic field

Strategic studies is an interdisciplinary academic field centered on the study of peace and conflict strategies, often devoting special attention to the relationship between military history, international politics, geostrategy, international diplomacy, international economics, and military power. In the scope of the studies are also subjects such as the role of intelligence, diplomacy, and international cooperation for security and defense. The subject is normally taught at the post-graduate academic or professional, usually strategic-political and strategic-military levels.

Strategic studies is closely associated with grand strategy, which a state's strategy of how means (military and nonmilitary) can be used to advance and achieve national interests in the long-term.

The academic foundations of the subject began with analysis of texts such as Sun Tzu’s Art of War and Carl von Clausewitz’s On War. In recent times, the major conflicts of the nineteenth century and the two World Wars have spurred strategic thinkers such as Mahan, Corbett, Giulio Douhet, Liddell Hart and, later, André Beaufre. The Cold War with its danger of degenerating into a nuclear war produced an expansion of the discipline, with authors like Bernard Brodie, Michael Howard, Raymond Aron, Lucien Poirier, Lawrence Freedman, Colin Gray, and many others.

== See also ==
- Grand strategy
- Combat effectiveness
- U.S. Army Strategist
