= School of Advanced Military Studies =

United States military postgraduate school

Coordinates: 39.01190°N 98.48425°W

School of Advanced Military Studies (SAMS)
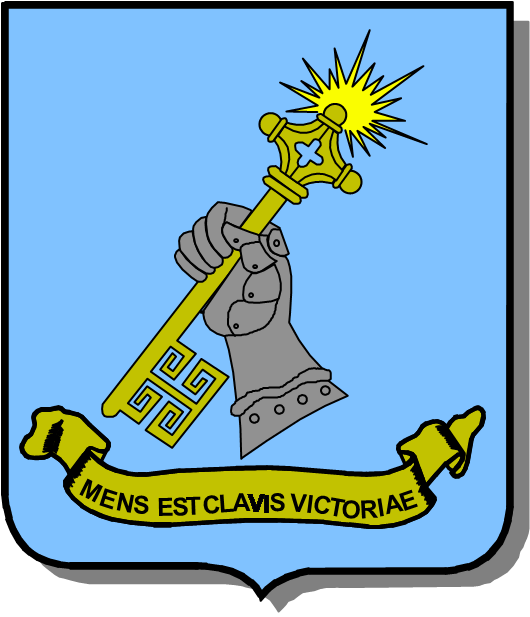
- The School of Advanced Military Studies Crest
- Active: 1981–present
- Country: United States
- Allegiance: Federal
- Garrison/HQ: Fort Leavenworth, Kansas
- Motto: The mind is the key to victory

Commanders
- Notable commanders: Wass de Czege

The School of Advanced Military Studies (SAMS) is one of four United States Army schools that make up the United States Army Command and General Staff College (CGSC) at Fort Leavenworth, Kansas. The "enormously rigorous" graduate school consists of three programs: the larger Advanced Military Studies Program (AMSP); the Advanced Strategic Leadership Studies Program (ASLSP), a Joint Military Professional Education II (JPME II) certified senior service college program for senior field-grade officers, and the Advanced Strategic Planning and Policy Program (ASP3), which supports officers in obtaining doctorates from civilian schools.

The school educates future leaders of the United States Armed Forces, its allies, and the Interagency at the graduate level to be agile and adaptive leaders who think critically at the strategic and operational levels to solve complex ambiguous problems. The student body is small but diverse and comprises members of each of the US armed forces, various US government agencies, and allied military forces. Graduates of AMSP are colloquially known as "Jedi Knights".^{[a]}

The school issues a master's degree in Military Art and Science, and provides its graduates with the skills to deal with the disparate challenges encountered in contemporary military and government operations. The modern course produces "leaders with the flexibility of mind to solve complex operational and strategic problems in peace, conflict, and war". Various senior military leaders have recognized the contributions of SAMS graduates in supporting global contingency operations.

The first class began at the school in mid-1983 and 13 students graduated the following year. Due to increasing requirements for SAMS graduates in the US military, the army expanded the school in the 1990s, and in 2010 over 120 students graduated. Since the school's inception, SAMS planners have supported every major US military campaign, providing the army "with many of its top campaign planners for the late twentieth and early twenty-first centuries".

== History ==
The SAMS course was designed to fill a gap in US military education between the CGSC's focus on tactics and the War College's focus on grand strategy and national security policy. In 1981, Colonel Huba Wass de Czege convinced Lieutenant General William R. Richardson, who was serving as Commander of the Combined Arms Center and Commandant of the Command and General Staff College at Fort Leavenworth from 1979 to 1981, that a second year of military education was needed for select officers. After receiving final approval, Wass de Czege helped plan and develop the school, which would open in mid-1983.^{[b]} Although there was some disagreement about the purpose of the course, army leaders and the course designers settled on a plan to provide officers with a "broad, deep military education in the science and art of war."

In June 1983, the first class of 13 US Army students began in the basement of Bell Hall at Fort Leavenworth. Initially, there were some internal problems with facilities and scheduling, and in the school's early years there was uncertainty whether its graduates would be accepted and how they would perform in the force. When the first class graduated in 1984, SAMS had already become "the symbol for intellectual renaissance in the officer corps". When the first director, Wass de Czege, was succeeded by Colonel Richard Sennreich in 1985, the school was already beginning to produce results and the US Army and the college regarded SAMS as a "useful experiment". By 1987, enrollment of high-quality officers had risen and sister services were becoming interested in sending students to SAMS. The program's growing popularity and reputation also began attracting students from allied countries.

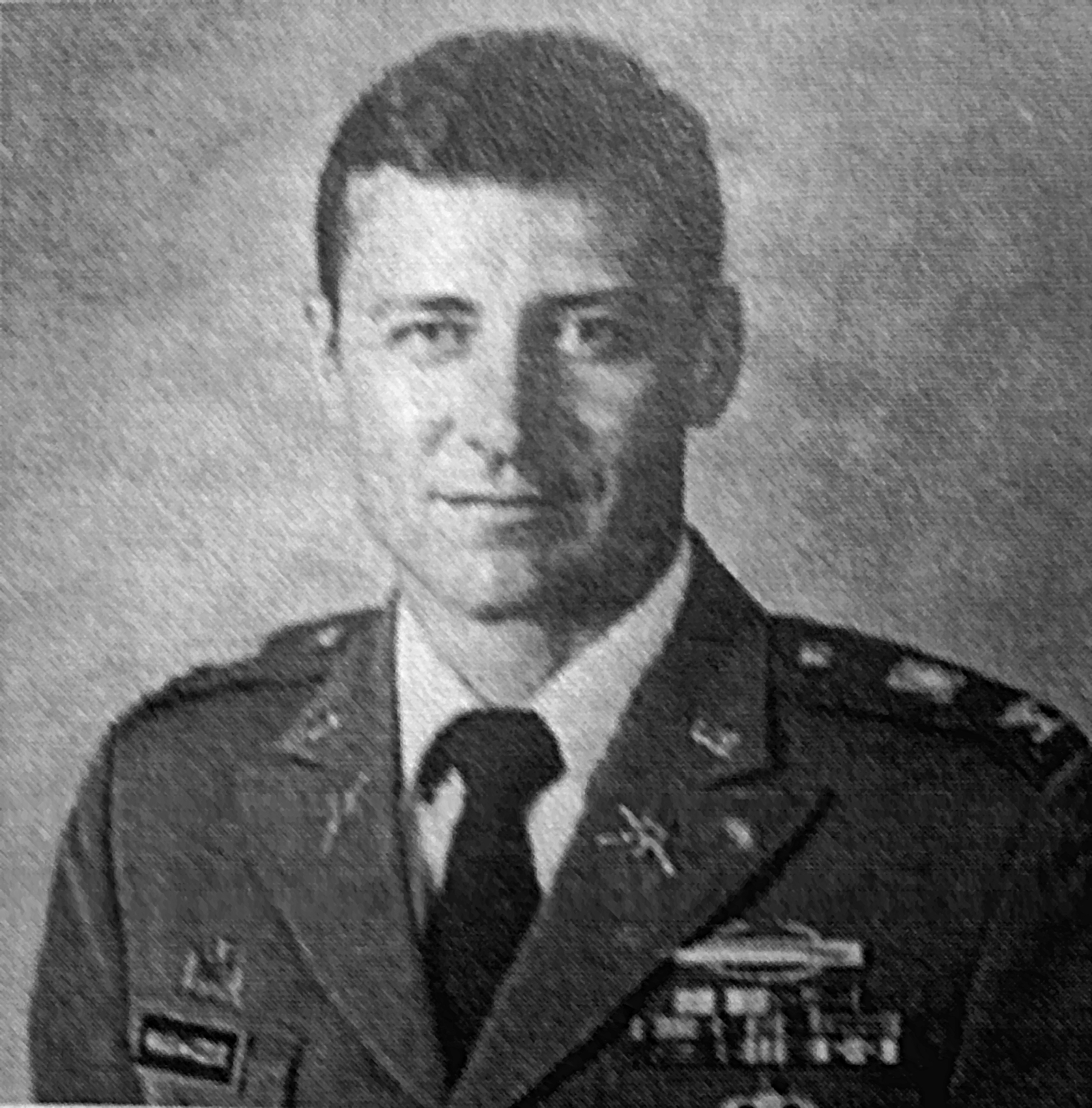
Colonel Wass de Czege, the school's first director

SAMS graduates first were in active service in December 1989 during Operation Just Cause in Panama. A core planning cell of seven SAMS graduates "crafted a well rehearsed and well executed plan that simultaneously struck some roughly 50 objectives in a single coordinated blow". According to Colonel Kevin Benson, the tenth director of the school, "The Army and SAMS faced a test of battle and the new group of highly-educated planners appeared to have passed the test with flying colors." After its mission in Panama, the army's leaders began to draw on SAMS to assist in additional ways. In the early 1990s, US Army leaders called upon the school to help develop army doctrine. Lieutenant Colonel Thomas E. Mitchell, Colonel James McDonough (the fifth SAMS director), and other members of the SAMS team helped revise the US Army Doctrinal Manual 100-5 Operations in 1990–1993.

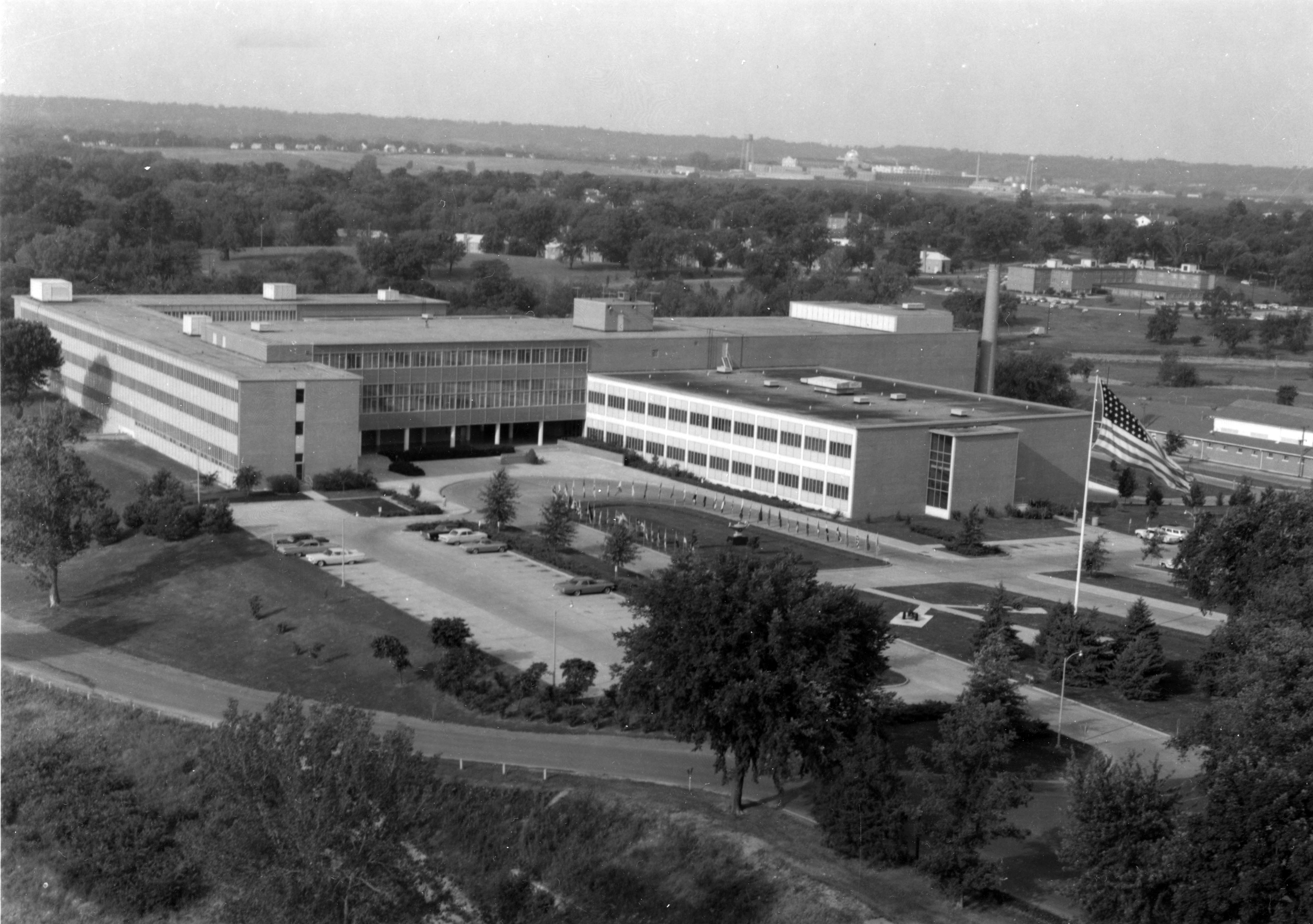
Bell Hall, the first home of SAMS

Lieutenant General Guy C. Swan said that SAMS graduates were indispensable in Europe after the fall of the Berlin Wall and the dissolution of the Warsaw Pact. They were expected to "re-engineer the decades of planning that had gone into the GDP [General Defense Plan] almost overnight". Swan said that this was "the first true test of SAMS on a large scale". SAMS graduates served in Operation Desert Shield/Desert Storm, and were "remembered most famously in the early days for producing the 'Jedi Knights' employed by Gen. Norman Schwarzkopf in developing the famous 'left hook'". SAMS graduates also served in roles beyond the initial planning, with 82 graduates participating in diverse theater tasks by February 1991. As a result, US Army leadership regarded SAMS as being a source of "superb planners".

The number one reason for the success of Desert Storm was General (H. Norman) Schwarzkopf. ... The number two reason was the air war, and the number three reason was the SAMS graduates who put together General Schwarzkopf's plan.

— Williamson Murray, Professor of Military History at Ohio State University, 1991.

After Desert Storm, the army struggled with military operations other than war, such as peacekeeping and peace enforcement operations. The school and its graduates examined the situations in Bosnia, Haiti, and Somalia. Graduates also participated in Defense Support of Civil authorities missions. The course continued to change in the 1990s. Under Colonel Gregory Fontenot, the school moved from Fort Leavenworth's Flint Hall to Eisenhower Hall in October 1994. In later years, the school's leadership expanded the number of seminars and the civilian faculty. The military continues to draw heavily on SAMS in the twenty-first century. SAMS planners have played a significant role in the Global War on Terror. Beginning in 2002, the United States Central Command requested planners from SAMS and its sister schools, the United States Air Force's School of Advanced Air and Space Studies (SAASS), which was designed to be similar to SAMS,^{[c]} and the United States Marine Corps's School of Advanced Warfighting (SAW). SAMS students from the 2002 and 2003 classes participated as planners in the preparations for the invasion of Iraq and the plan for the post-combat occupation.

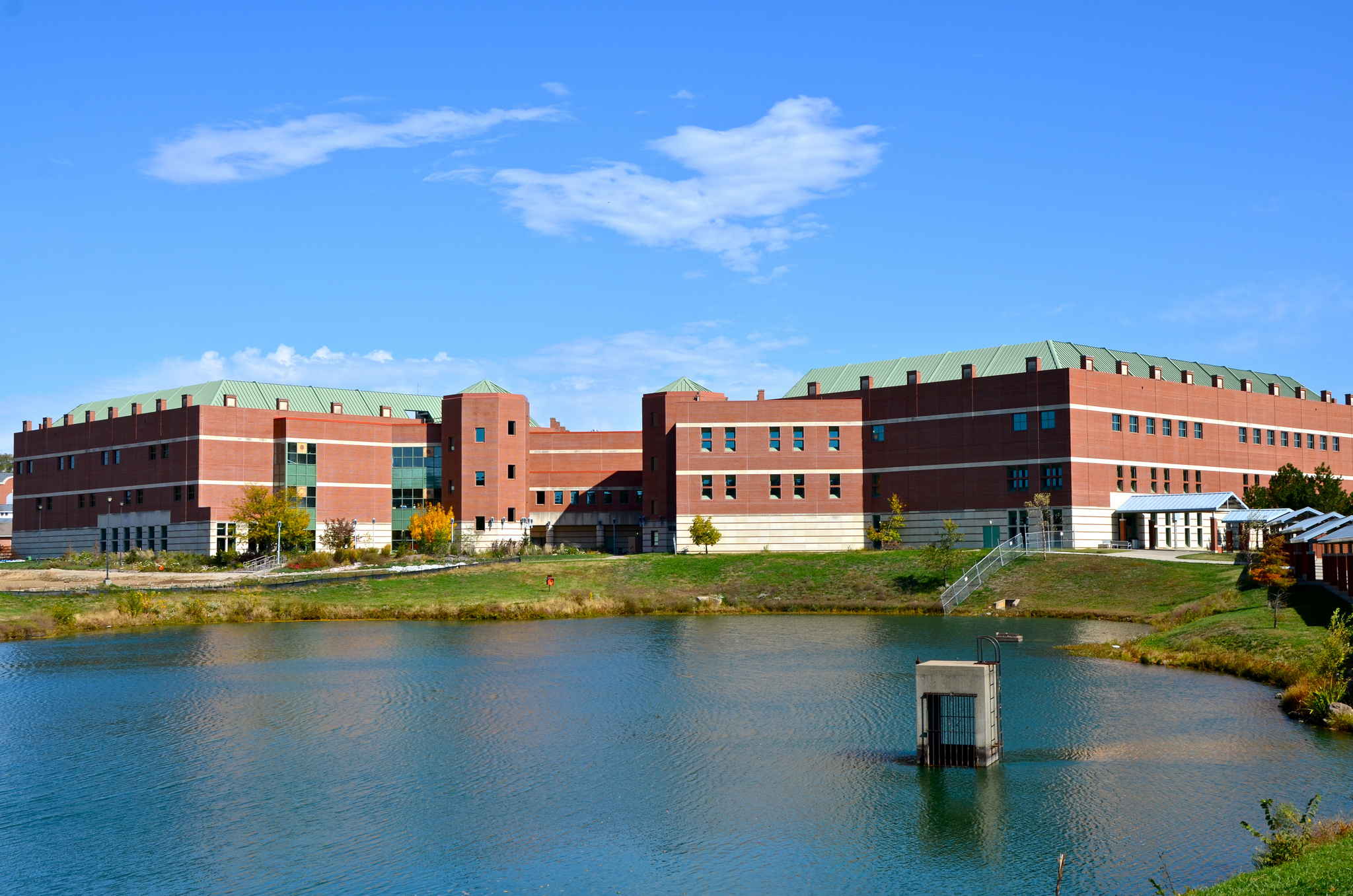
Eisenhower Hall, the home of SAMS from 1994 to 2011

The school continued to change and develop, and an additional faculty expansion occurred in 2005–2006. Also, the Fellows' curriculum shifted further away from that of the AMSP program. To keep pace with increasing demand for SAMS planners, the commander of the army's Training and Doctrine Command directed an expansion that was approved by the Chief of Staff of the Army, and the school's 11th director, Colonel Steve Banach, began a winter-start course in 2007. During this period, SAMS provided planners to help forward-deployed headquarters plan operations and contingencies. The school moved to new premises in the newly renovated Muir Hall at Fort Leavenworth on 30 August 2011.

== Contributions ==
I realized that the SAMS guy in the Division HQ was the go-to person for everyone.

— Lieutenant General Mark Hertling, 1988 SAMS graduate.

SAMS graduates have supported every major US military campaign between 1984 and 2009. SAMS graduates are known for their "critical thinking skill sets", and are consistently called for by combatant commanders around the world. In 2010, Brigadier General Sean MacFarland said, "In a crisis, the president always asks, 'where are the aircraft carriers?' In the Army, leaders ask, 'Where are the SAMS graduates?' Just as the aircraft carrier was a game changer in naval warfare, SAMS graduates and practitioners of operational art have been game changers in land warfare."

The school has won praise by senior US military leaders. According to Major General David Hogg, "SAMS has a reputation for producing skilled planners that can take complex ideas and develop cohesive plans." In 2010, army Vice Chief of Staff Peter W. Chiarelli said that SAMS was "at the forefront of the effort to remake strategic military planning for the 21st century".

== Facilities and student body ==
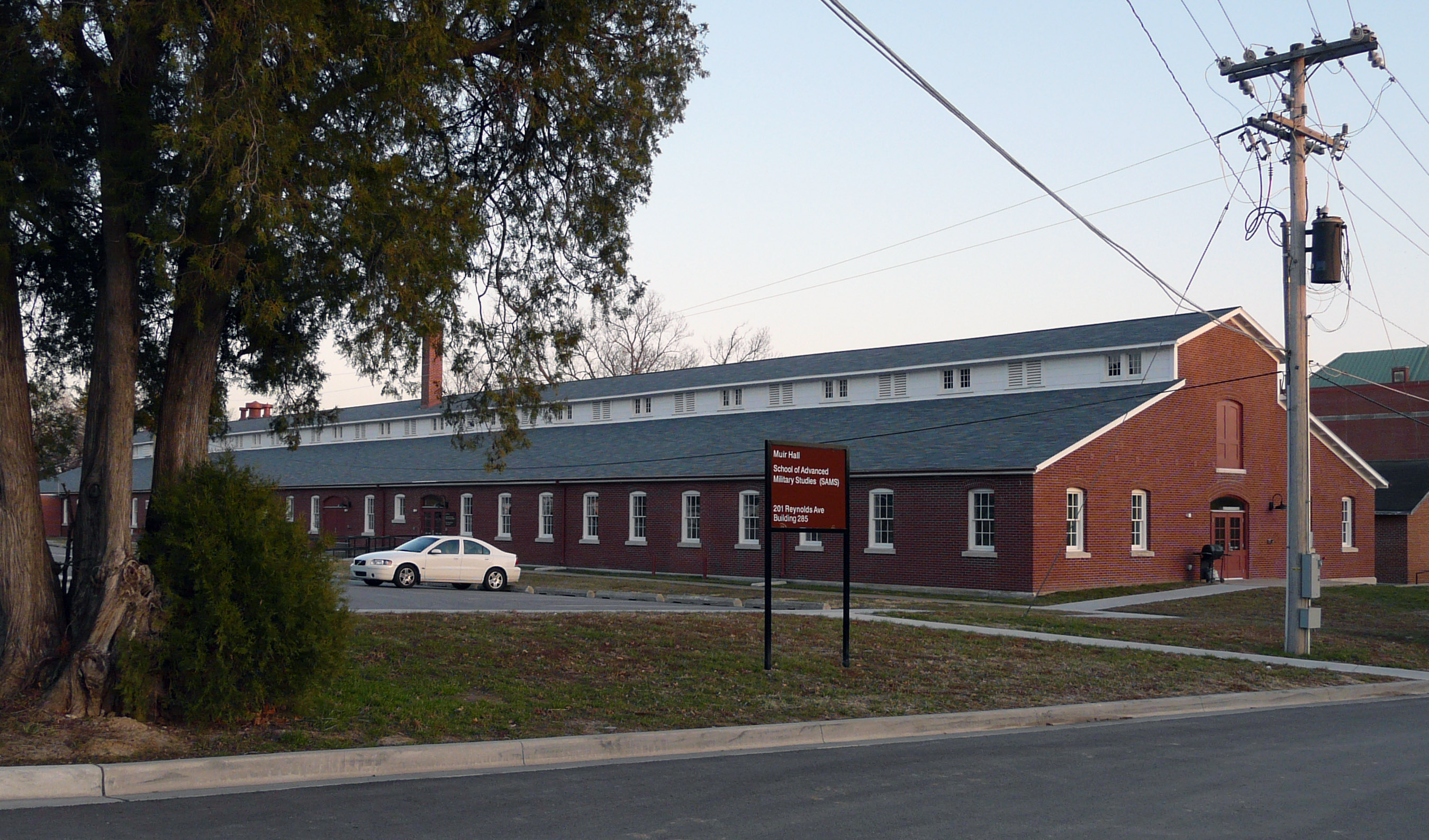
Muir Hall

As of 2014, the SAMS teaching facilities are mainly housed in Muir Hall (image right), which was once a stable, and Flint Hall. The AMSP courses are taught mostly in Muir Hall—the current SAMS headquarters—while Flint Hall houses additional AMSP seminars. Both buildings were renovated in 2011 and their classrooms accommodate seminars of about 16–18 students and an instructor. The renovations for Muir Hall cost $12.2 million, including $3 million in information systems that allow students to collaborate digitally, replicating a common practice seen in militaries today.

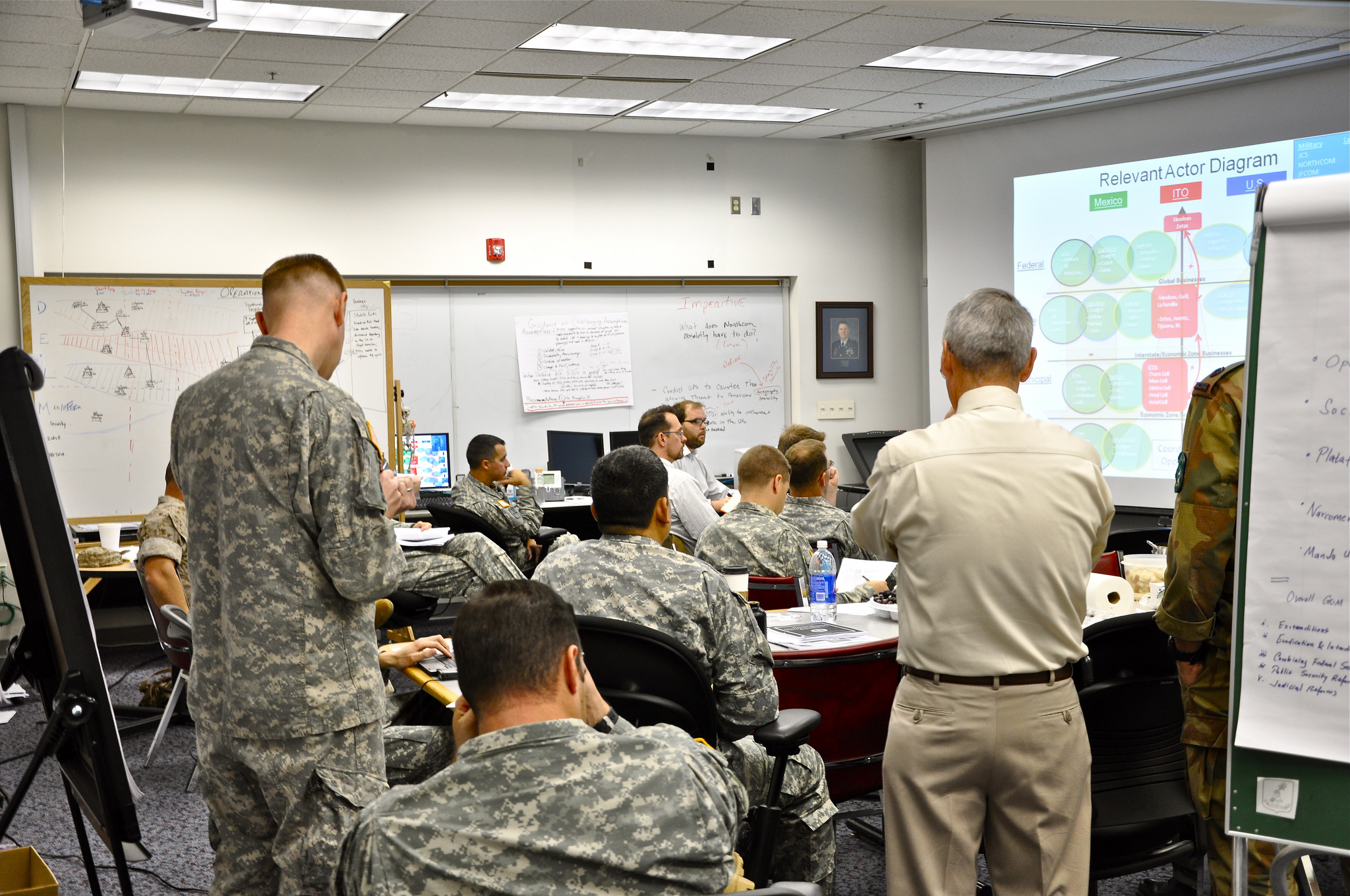
SAMS classroom activities, November 2010

The application process includes an examination, an interview, and a supervisor assessment. Applicants must also complete the US Army's Command and General Staff School or an equivalent intermediate-level education course offered by another uniformed service. The student body of SAMS comprises mostly US Army field grade officers from combat, combat support, and combat service support branches. However, in 1987 the US Air Force graduated three officers and officers from the US Navy and US Marine Corps graduated in following years. US government agencies began sending students to SAMS in 2007. The Department of State, Federal Bureau of Investigation, and the United States Agency for International Development (USAID) have sent students to the school. Also warrant officers first attended SAMS in 2010.

Allied foreign militaries also provide students. In 1999, the school graduated its first international officers—Norwegian and Canadian. Argentina, Australia, Colombia, France, Germany, Hungary, India, Jordan, Republic of North Macedonia, the Netherlands, Pakistan, Romania, South Korea, Brazil, Spain, and the United Kingdom have also sent students through the course.

== Curricula ==
The Command and General Staff College awards a Master of Military Art and Science (M.M.A.S.) professional degree to graduates of the School of Advanced Military Studies. The degree is accredited by the Higher Learning Commission for collegiate institutions in the midwestern United States.

=== Advanced Military Studies Program ===
Most students participate in the Advanced Military Studies Program (AMSP). In 2009, the school held eight AMSP seminars. AMSP is intended to educate students in military arts and science, and focuses on operational art and covers a variety of subjects, including military problem solving; military theory and history, military doctrine, operational planning; battle dynamics, operational theory and practice, contemporary military operations, and the application of national elements of power. Besides classroom studies and operational exercises, students must complete a research monograph^{[d]} and an oral examination. After graduating, officers serve on a division, corps, or Army Service Component Command staff, or in a functional area assignment.

AMSP graduates are eagerly sought out by senior commanders for addition to their staffs as high-level planners and in other capacities demanding a more sophisticated appreciation of the operational level of war, joint operations, and the evolving contemporary operating environment.

— United States Army Command and General Staff College.

=== Advanced Strategic Leadership Studies Program ===
ASLSP is the school's senior service college resident program, educating sixteen officers for strategic-level responsibilities; developing them to be senior leaders. Students are senior lieutenant colonels, colonels, and their Naval, Coast Guard, and US interagency civilian equivalents. Classes include students from the UK, Canadian, and German armies. Most military students are former battalion commanders. The faculty consists of four civilian professors, one of whom also serves as the program's Director, plus one military faculty member. Graduates are awarded a Masters of Arts degree in Strategic Studies, Military Education Level (MEL) I, and Joint Professional Military Education (JPME) II. US military officers are also awarded the SAMS Additional Skill Identifier (ASI) 6S.

The program began in 1984 as the Advanced Operational Studies Fellowship (AOSF) by diverting lieutenant colonel War College selectees to Fort Leavenworth for an equivalent education program. The AOSF program had students completing the AMSP coursework, and then serve as the principal instructors of AMSP during their second year. In 1995, the name of the program was changed to the Advanced Operational Art Studies Fellowship (AOASF), and in the early 21st century its curriculum was more closely aligned to the strategic level of war. In 2013, the program was again modified in part to bring it more in alignment with TRADOC policies, and to prepare it for Joint Professional Education II accreditation. It was at that time renamed the Advanced Strategic Leadership Studies Program (ASLSP).

The course focuses on the strategic and political aspects of war and educationally prepares students for assignments as strategic leaders. The academic year runs from late June through late May. The ASLSP curriculum provides a comprehensive, multifaceted focus at the theater-strategic level across the spectrum of Joint and land force operations during peace, crisis, and war. The program includes classroom studies of strategy, regional studies, joint operations, strategic leadership, and twentieth-century conflict. Students also research and write a publishable-quality monograph of 10,000- 12,000 words on a suitable subject. ASLSP includes an extensive field studies program, with approximately eight weeks of TDY, to reinforce and expand classroom studies and meet with senior leaders across JIIM organizations. Field Studies include interactions with several agencies in the National Capital Region, Europe, Asia-Pacific, and CONUS-based combatant commands, and visits to various military and civilian governmental agencies. Normally, six US Army officers and the USMC, Canadian, and German officers remain for a second year to serve as seminar leaders in the AMSP course, while one US Army officer joins the faculty of the ASLSP as the military faculty member. Graduates typically serve in a follow-on command assignment or work for a three- or four-star general officer as a member of his or her staff.

== Notable graduates ==
- General Vincent K. Brooks (class of 1992)
- Lieutenant General William B. Caldwell, IV (class of 1988)
- General Charles C. Campbell (class of 1986)
- Michael T. Flynn, Former National Security Advisor (class of 1994)
- Lieutenant General Mark P. Hertling (class of 1988)
- Lieutenant General David H. Huntoon (class of 1988)
- General Charles H. Jacoby Jr. (class of 1991)
- Major General John V. Meyer III
- General David M. Rodriguez (class of 1989)
- Lieutenant General John E. Sterling, Jr. (class of 1992)
- General Jonathan Vance, Canadian Chief of Defence Staff
- Lieutenant General William G. Webster (class of 1984)

== Notes ==
a. According to Kevin Benson, the 10th director of the school, "The first 'official' reference to the School of Advanced Military Studies (SAMS) graduates as Jedi Knights was on 12 May 1992 during a meeting of the Committee on Armed Services Military Education Panel in Washington D.C." Congressman Ike Skelton stated, "we all know that the real stamp of approval came when General Schwarzkopf requested SAMS graduates, sometimes referred to as 'Jedi Knights," be sent to his headquarters in Riyadh to assist in developing the campaign plan."
b. The other two officers assigned to assist Wass de Czege in preparing the curricula for the school were Lieutenant Colonels Hal Winton and Douglas Johnson. Another key member of the SAMS staff was Mrs. Candace Hamm whose service to the school since 1988 earned her the title of "godmother of SAMS".
c. SAASS's first director, Colonel William Fortner, stated in 1991 that the new school (originally called the School of Advanced Airpower Studies) "will be similar to the Army's School of Advanced Military Studies at Fort Leavenworth", with additional focuses on air power topics.
d. Initially, the requirement was to complete a master's thesis. School director Don Holder (1987–1989) changed this requirement to two monographs, the first with a tactical focus, and the second on an operational level topic. This continued until the school's eighth director, Robin P. Swan (1998–2001) changed the monograph requirement back to one "in the face of multiple and competing requirements".

== See also ==
- Basic Strategic Art Program
- U.S. Army Strategist

== Bibliography ==
- Baggott, Christopher L. (1998). The School of Advanced Military Studies in the 21st Century (SAMS Monograph). United States Army Command and General Staff College.
- Baker, Jon E.; Sepanic, Jason R. (October–December 2010). "The School for Advanced Military Studies: An Untapped Resource for the Army Medical Department". U.S. Army Medical Department Journal. U.S. Army Medical Department: 78–80. ISSN 1524-0436. PMID 21181678.
- Banach, Stefan J. (March–April 2009). "Educating by Design: Preparing Leaders for a Complex World". Military Review: 96–104. ISSN 0026-4148.
- Barth, Frank L. (2002). The Challenges of Leadership Development in the United States Army: Part II: The School of Advanced Military Studies (SAMS) (SAMS Monograph). United States Army Command and General Staff College.
- Bower, Melissa (9 December 2010). "SAMS graduates renowned for skill sets". The Lamp.
- Bower, Melissa (8 December 2011). "SAMS graduation adds to pool of planners". The Lamp. Archived from the original on 26 April 2012.
- Brown, John S. "The Maturation of Operational Art: Operation Desert Shield and Desert Storm." In Krause, Michael D.; Phillips, R. Cody, eds. (2005). Historical Perspectives of the Operational Art. Washington D.C.: Center of Military History. pp. 439–475.
- Benson, Kevin (2009). School of Advanced Military Studies Commemorative History: 1984–2009. Kansas: United States Army Command and General Staff College.
- Benson, Kevin C. M. (2010). Educating the Army's Jedi: The School of Advanced Military Studies and the Introduction of Operational Art into U.S. Army Doctrine, 1983–1994 (PhD Diss.). University of Kansas. hdl:1808/7716.
- Erickson, Matt (30 August 2011). "Former Horse Stables Become Site of Fort Leavenworth Officer School after $12.2 Million Renovation". The Tonganoxie Mirror. Archived from the original on 28 September 2011.
- Gifford, John L. (2000). Teaching and Learning the Operational Art of War: An Appraisal of the School of Advanced Military Studies (SAMS Monograph). United States Army Command and General Staff College.
- Goble, Jeffrey J. (2008). Wants and Needs: SAMS' Relationship with the Army (SAMS Monograph). United States Army Command and General Staff College.
- High, Gill (April 1999). "More than "Officer U"". Soldiers. 54 (4): 32–35. ISSN 0093-8440.
- Huntoon, Samuel (21 May 2009). "Huntoon Speech" (PDF). United States Army Combined Arms Center. Archived from the original (PDF) on 29 August 2012.
- Kretchik, Walter E. (December 1998), "Whither SAMS?", Army Magazine, 48 (12): 31–34, ISSN 0093-8440.
- Liewer, Steve (21 May 2010). "SAMS Graduates Largest Class". United States Army Combined Arms Center. Archived from the original on 7 November 2010.
- Naylor, Sean D. (29 April 1991), "'Jedi Knights' Put Together a Winning Plan", Air Force Times, 38: 10, 16, ISSN 0002-2403.
- Plank, Lori (16 April 2010). "Inside Modern Military Training" (PDF). Kansas City Star. Kansas: U.S. Army Combined Arms Center. Archived from the original (PDF) on 7 November 2010.
- Romjue, John L. (1996). American Army Doctrine for the Post-Cold War. TRADOC Historical Monograph Series. Fort Monroe, Virginia: Headquarters, United States Army Training and Doctrine Command, Military History Office.
- Romjue, John L.; Canedy, Susan; Chapman, Anne W. (1993). Prepare the Army for War: A Historical Overview of the Army Training and Doctrine Command, 1973–1993. TRADOC Historical Monograph Series. Fort Monroe, Virginia: Headquarters, United States Army Training and Doctrine Command, Office of the Command Historian.
- Scales, Robert H. (October 2009), "Return of the Jedi", Armed Forces Journal: 22–25, 45, ISSN 0196-3597.
- Schifferle, Peter J. (2010). America's School for War: Fort Leavenworth, Officer Education, and Victory in World War II. Modern War Studies. University Press of Kansas. ISBN 978-0700617142.
- Stewart, Richard W., ed. (2010). The United States Army in a Global Era, 1917–2008. American Military History. Vol. II (Second ed.). Washington D.C.: United States Army Center of Military History.
- Stewart, Michael David (2010). Raising a Pragmatic Army: Officer Education at the U.S. Army Command and General Staff College (PhD Diss.). University of Kansas.
- Swain, Richard M. (1996). "Filling the Void: The Operational Art and the U.S. Army". In B.J.C. McKercher and Michael Hennesey (ed.). Operational Art: Developments in the Theories of War. Praeger Publishers. ISBN 978-0275953058.
- United States (1 February 2010). DA Pamphlet 600-3: Commissioned Officer Professional Development and Career Management. Washington D.C.: Headquarters, Department of the Army. p. 44.
- United States Army Command and General Staff College (December 2005). Self-Study Report. Fort Leavenworth, Kansas: United States Army Command and General Staff College.
- United States Army Command and General Staff College (2 June 2009). "SAMS 25th Anniversary Documentary". YouTube. United States Army Command and General Staff College. Archived from the original on 11 December 2021.
- United States Army Command and General Staff College (8 January 2008). Intermediate Level Education: Self-Study Report. Fort Leavenworth, Kansas: United States Army Command and General Staff College.
- United States Army Command and General Staff College. "School of Advanced Military Studies (SAMS Tri-Fold)" (PDF). School of Advanced Military Studies. United States Command and General Staff College. Archived from the original (PDF) on 29 August 2012.
- United States Army Combined Arms Center and School. "Command and General Staff College Circular 350-1" (PDF). United States Army Combined Arms Center and School. Archived from the original (PDF) on 7 November 2010.
- United States Army Command and General Staff College. "CGSC – Command and General Staff College: School of Advanced Military Studies – Converting intellectual power into combat power.". cgsc.edu. Archived from the original on 18 October 2013.
- United States Army Command and General Staff College (13 July 2011). "Combined Arms Research Library Digital". Kansas: U.S. Army Command and General Staff College. Archived from the original on 9 September 2016.
- United States Army Training and Doctrine Command (2003). Transforming the Army: TRADOC's First Thirty Years, 1973–2003. TRADOC Historical Monograph Series. Fort Monroe, Virginia: Headquarters, United States Army Training and Doctrine Command, Military History Office.
- United States, Congress, Another Crossroads? Professional Military Education Twenty Years after the Goldwater-Nichols Act and the Skelton Panel. 111th Congress. 1st Sess. 20 May 2009. United States Government Printing Office. Washington D.C. 2010.
- United States Army Command and General Staff College Public Affairs (10 August 2010). "SAMS 25th Anniversary Celebration: A Quarter Century of Excellence in Education". United States Army Combined Arms Center. Archived from the original on 26 June 2009.
- U.S. News & World Report (1992). Triumph Without Victory: The Unreported History of the Persian Gulf War. New York and Toronto: Random House. ISBN 0-8129-1948-3.
- Wass de Czege, Huba (November 1984). "How to Change an Army". Military Review: 33–49. ISSN 0026-4148.
- Wass de Czege, Huba (July–August 2009). "The School of Advanced Military Studies: An Accident of History". Military Review. 89 (4): 102–106. ISSN 0026-4148.
- Wass de Czege, Huba (13 June 1983). Army Staff College Level Training Study (Final Report). Fort Leavenworth, Kansas: United States Army Command and General Staff College.
- West, Joe (29 April 1991), "AF to Develop Soldier-scholar", Air Force Times, 38: 10, 16, ISSN 0002-2403.
