= Progressive war =

Military strategy

Progressive war is a military strategy in which only enemy combatants are targeted, and non-combatants killed or wounded by collateral damage are kept to a minimum. Its principles were established by Dutch jurist Hugo Grotius, who is considered to be a founder of international law, in his book De jure belli ac pacis libri tres ("On the Law of War and Peace: Three Books"), published in 1625. A successful practitioner was Helmuth von Moltke the Elder, as chief of staff of the Prussian Army in the 19th century.

The opposite of progressive war is unlimited war, which includes civilians as legitimate targets. Unlimited war uses military action against civilians, in the hope of undermining the will to fight by the people and their leaders so that they end their resistance. Examples of unlimited war are cluster bombs, the firebombing of Dresden, the German bombing of British cities during the Blitz, the firebombing of Tokyo and the atomic bombings of Hiroshima and Nagasaki.

The philosophy of unlimited war is controversial. Many consider it a form of terrorism in the sense of deliberately attacking noncombatants in the hope of changing their mindset. Such ambiguities between unlimited warfare and terrorist strategies could be the source of why many terrorist groups consider themselves honourable fighters, and many consider the US military to be terrorists.

Guerrilla warfare can be considered progressive if it is only enemy combatants that are targeted, but it becomes terrorism when noncombatants are targeted.
