= David R. Mayhew =

American political scientist (born 1937)

- Born: May 18, 1937 (age 89)
- Occupation: Yale University Sterling Professor of Political Science

Education
- Education: Amherst College (BA); Harvard University (PhD)
- Thesis: Democrats and Republicans in the U.S. House of Representatives: A Study in Intra-Party Coalition Patterns in the Postwar Period (1964)
- Doctoral advisor: V. O. Key, Jr.

Philosophical work
- Region: American politics
- Institutions: Yale; Harvard; Oxford (Nuffield College); UMass Amherst; Amherst College
- Main interests: Congress; elections; political parties
- Notable ideas: Electoral Connection; Position taking; Credit claiming; Divided party control
- Website: campuspress.yale.edu/davidmayhew/

David R. Mayhew (born May 18, 1937) is a political scientist and Sterling Professor of Political Science Emeritus at Yale University. He is widely considered one of the leading scholars on the United States Congress, and the author of nine influential books on American politics, including Congress: The Electoral Connection. In 2017, University of California, Berkeley professor Eric Schickler chronicled Mayhew's lifetime of contributions to the study of Congress in a journal article published in The Forum. Mayhew has been a member of the Yale faculty since 1968, and his students include several leading contemporary scholars of American politics, including the University of California, San Diego Distinguished Emeritus Professor Gary Jacobson, Yale University Stanley B. Resor Professor Jacob Hacker, Northwestern Pritzker School of Law professor Steven Calabresi, Princeton University William Church Osborn Professor of Public Affairs, Emeritus R. Douglas Arnold, University of California-Berkeley Jeffrey & Ashley McDermott Endowed Chair Eric Schickler, and University of Chicago Charles L. Hutchinson Distinguished Service Professor John Mark Hansen, as well as many famous figures such as Detroit Lions Pro Bowl quarterback Greg Landry and CNN personality Chris Cuomo. He has also taught at the University of Massachusetts, Amherst College, Oxford University, and Harvard University.

== Writings ==
In Congress: The Electoral Connection, Mayhew argued that much of the organization of the United States Congress can be explained as the result of re-election seeking behavior by its members. In Divided We Govern, he disputed the previously accepted notion that, when Congress and the presidency are controlled by different parties, less important legislation is passed than under unified government. The book won the 1992 Richard E. Neustadt prize. Princeton professor R. Douglas Arnold, another student of Mayhew's, noted that the academic literature on Congress can be cleanly categorized as coming "before" or "after" Congress: The Electoral Connection.

His 2011 book, Partisan Balance: Why Political Parties Don't Kill the U.S. Constitutional System (Princeton University Press, 2011), contends that majoritarianism largely characterizes the American system. The wishes of the majority tend to nudge institutions back toward the median voter. Partisan Balance won the 2011 Leon D. Epstein Outstanding Award from the American Political Science Association.

In his most recent work, The Imprint of Congress, Mayhew makes a case for studying the consequences of Congress's activities, not just the aspirations, processes, and optics associated with those activities. The book analyzes congressional participation in a series of policy impulses that have invested the United States from the 1790s through recent times.

== Education and awards ==
Mayhew earned his Ph.D. from Harvard University in 1964, and his B.A. from Amherst College in 1958. He is a Fellow of the American Academy of Arts and Sciences. In 2002, he received from the American Political Science Association the James Madison Award, which, awarded triennelly, "recognizes an American political scientist who has made a distinguished scholarly contribution to political science." In 2004, he received the Samuel J. Eldersveld Award for lifetime achievement also from the American Political Science Association. In 2018, Mayhew was awarded the American Political Science Association Barbara Sinclair Legacy Award for a lifetime of significant scholarship to the study of legislative politics. In 2007, Mayhew was elected to the American Philosophical Society, and on April 30, 2013, he was elected to the National Academy of Sciences, completing the prestigious "trifecta" of academic honors in the social sciences.

== Books ==
- Party Loyalty among Congressmen, (Harvard University Press, 1966)
- Congress: The Electoral Connection, (Yale University Press, 1974; reissued 2004)
- Placing Parties in American Politics, (Princeton University Press, 1986)
- Actions in the Public Sphere, (Yale University Press, 2000)
- Electoral Realignments: A Critique of an American Genre (Yale University Press, 2002)
- Divided We Govern: Party Control, Lawmaking, and Investigations, 1946-2002, (Yale University Press, 2005)
- Parties and Policies: How the American Government Works (Yale University Press, 2008)
- Partisan Balance: Why Political Parties Don't Kill the U.S. Constitutional System, (Princeton University Press, 2011)
- The Imprint of Congress, (Yale University Press, 2017)
