= Colin S. Gray =

British political scientist (1943–2020)

Colin S. Gray (December 29, 1943 – February 27, 2020) was a British-American writer on geopolitics and professor of International Relations and Strategic Studies at the University of Reading, where he was the director of the Centre for Strategic Studies. In addition, he was a Senior Associate to the National Institute for Public Policy.

Gray was educated at the University of Manchester and the University of Oxford. He worked at the International Institute for Strategic Studies and the Hudson Institute, before founding the National Institute for Public Policy in Washington, D.C. He also served as a defence adviser both to the British and U.S. governments. Gray served from 1982 until 1987 in the Reagan Administration's General Advisory Committee on Arms Control and Disarmament. He taught at the University of Hull, the University of Lancaster, York University, the University of Toronto, St Antony's College, Oxford and the University of British Columbia. Gray published 30 books on military history and strategic studies, as well as numerous articles.

Gray was criticized by Alex Marshall of the University of Glasgow for his attempt to elevate Harry S. Truman's reputation to "a level of adulation far higher than the historical record could ever objectively sustain", as well as for Gray's silence on Truman's intellectual mediocrity and role in bringing about the Cold War.

== Bibliography ==
- Canadian Defence Policy: A Question of Priorities (Toronto: Clarke, Irwin, 1972).
- 'Predicting Arms Race Behaviour' Futures (October, 1974)
- The Soviet-American Arms Race (Lexington, MA: Lexington Books, 1976).
- The Geopolitics of the Nuclear Era (New York: Crane, Russak, 1977)
- 'Victory is Possible', with Keith Payne (in: Foreign policy, No. 39 Summer 1980 : 14–27)
- The MX ICBM and National Security (New York: Praeger, 1981).
- Strategic Studies: A Critical Assessment (Westport, CT: Greenwood Press, 1982).
- Strategic Studies and Public Policy: The American Experience (Lexington, KY: The University Press of Kentucky, 1982).
- American Military Space Policy: Information Systems, Weapon Systems, and Arms Control (Cambridge, MA:Abt, 1983).
- Nuclear Strategy and National Style (Lanham, MD: University Press of America, 1986)
- The Geopolitics of Super Power (Lexington, KY:University Press of Kentucky, 1988).
- War, Peace, and Victory: Strategy and Statecraft for the Next Century (New York: Simon and Schuster, 1990).
- House of Cards: Why Arms Control Must Fail (Ithaca, NY: Cornell University Press, 1992).
- The Leverage of Sea Power: The Strategic Advantage of Navies in War (New York: The Free Press, 1992).
- Weapons Don't Make War: Policy, Strategy, and Technology (Lawrence, KS: University Press of Kansas, 1993).
- The Navy in the Post-Cold War World: The Uses and Value of Strategic Sea Power (University Park, PA: Penn State University Press, 1994).
- Explorations in Strategy (Westport, CT: Greenwood Press, 1996; 1998 sec. ed. pb [Praeger]).
- The Second Nuclear Age (Boulder, CO: Lynne Rienner Publishers, 1999).
- Modern Strategy (Oxford: Oxford University Press, 1999).
- Strategy for Chaos: Revolutions in Military Affairs and Other Evidence of History (London: Frank Cass, 2002).
- Another Bloody Century: Future Warfare (London: Weidenfeld and Nicolson, 2005)
- Strategy and History: Essays on Theory and Practice (Abingdon, UK: Routledge, 2006).
- War, Peace, and International Relations. An Introduction to Strategic History (Abingdon, UK:Routledge, 2007).
- The Strategy Bridge: Theory for Practice (Oxford, UK; Oxford University Press, 2010)
- Airpower for Strategic Effect (Maxwell AFB, AL: Air University Press, 2012).
- Strategy and Defence Planning: Meeting the Challenge of Uncertainty (Oxford University Press, 2014).
