= Congress: The Electoral Connection =

- Author: David Mayhew
- Language: English
- Publication date: 1974

Congress: The Electoral Connection is a book by David Mayhew, first published in 1974, that applies rational choice theory to the actions of American Congressmen. Mayhew argues that Congressmen are motivated by re-election.

Mayhew uses pieces from Anthony Downs's and Richard Fenno's works to build his own argument and present his own rational choice model for members of Congress.

== Book ==
=== Opening statements ===
Mayhew claims that the book is theoretical; it pursues an argument and considers the implications for exploratory purposes.

Mayhew's model rests on the assumption that all members of Congress are single-minded seekers of reelection. He references the decreasing turnover rate of congressmen as evidence for the transition to full-time politicians interested in advancing their careers. It is also the goal that must be reached in order for any other goals (legislation) to be achieved.

=== Electoral incentive ===
Whereas the British system (GB) is adept at producing candidates representative of their party, the American system (US) produces more individualized candidates, candidates who may or may not reflect local interests more than their parties' national stances.

1. (GB) the system produces candidates "who will vote the party line if and when they reach Parliament"
2. (GB) candidates have to rely on their party's base for support; (US) candidates must find support independent of their party
3. (GB) Party cohesion is incentivized by cabinet positions

Questions introduced in Section 1

- Do members of Congress have any control in getting reelected?
- Is there a connection between what they do in office and their need to be reelected?
- Do members of Congress believe their activities have an electoral impact?
- Do members of Congress' activities have an electoral impact?

Other points

- the need for money in primary elections

=== 2: Processes and policies ===
The goal of this part of Mayhew's work is to show what happens when members who need to engage in these activities assemble for collective action.

1. Examines the salient structural units of Congress (offices, committees, and parties) and the ways in which these units are arranged to meet electoral needs.
2. Explores the "functions" that Congress fulfills or is thought to fulfill.
3. Examines structural arrangements in Congress that promote institutional maintenance.
4. Discusses the place of assemblies in governance in the U.S. and elsewhere.
5. Considers "reform" efforts provoked by dissatisfaction with congressional performance.

== Terminology ==
=== Single-minded seekers of reelection ===
Congress is often viewed as being made up of single-minded seekers of reelection. This mindset affects how they gather support, interact with interest groups, make policy, everything within Congress and on Capitol Hill.

=== Credit claiming ===
To claim credit for something that benefits constituents

=== Position taking ===
Politicians get "reward for taking positions rather than achieving effects"

== Miscellaneous arguments ==
"What a congressman has to do is to insure that in primary and general elections the resource balance (with all other deployed resources finally translated into votes) favors himself rather than somebody else"
