= United States Army Strategist =

U.S. Army Career Field

Army Strategist
- FA59 Crest
- Active: 1998 to current
- Country: United States of America
- Branch: United States Army
- Type: Functional Area
- Role: Strategy
- Anniversaries: 15 July

United States Army Strategist or Functional Area 59 or FA59 is a functional area of the United States Army. While the U.S. military and Army has had strategic thinkers throughout its history, the United States Army's FA59 career field emerged in the late 1990s with its first cohort beginning duty in 2001, partially due to arguments made by General John R. Galvin in a 1989 article advocating for military strategists during a period of declining strategic expertise in the United States. Colonel (Ret.) Charles Moore stated that by 2010 the "return of the Army Strategist" was already reversing this decline.

U.S. Army Strategists have diverse backgrounds and advanced education which provide skills such as creative and critical thinking—allowing them to lead planning at organizations such as combatant commands and multinational headquarters. Officers are selected from the Voluntary Transfer Incentive Program for the career field or are assessed through the FA59 Scholars Program (part of the U.S. Army HRC Broadening Opportunity Program). Strategists do not command but instead rotate through repeated strategic-level assignments to obtain the strategic planning and leadership abilities necessary for development and to promote "a deep understanding of national defense issues and processes".

FA59 officers in 2021 serve in a wide variety of joint, intergovernmental, interagency, and multinational organizations. Assignments include service staffs, the Joint Staff, the Office of the Secretary of Defense, Corps Headquarters, Army Commands (e.g. Army Futures Command, Army Material Command, TRADOC), Army Service Component Commands, and combatant commands. Strategists serve as speechwriters, authors of key defense documents, operational planners, and in other key positions. According to Moore, "demand for Army strategists continues to increase".

== History ==
=== Military strategists in the United States ===
Retired Army Colonel Charles Moore notes that, through history, "the Army has always produced strategic thinkers and planners". He points to successful cases from the U.S. Civil War such as General Winfield Scott and his early Anaconda Plan, General John J. Pershing's activities in World War I, (Note: Moore identifies this as Pershing's efforts to keep United States forces separate during the conflict while "balancing domestic and international concerns".) and George C. Marshall in World War II, followed by a declining role during the Cold War where the collective capability of military strategists reached its nadir, a condition also associated with a loss of "America's strategic competence".

In 1989, General John R. Galvin published an article called: "What's the Matter with Being a Strategist?" Besides defining the required characteristics of military strategists, Galvin advocated for their return. Galvin's article was an impetus for the creation of the FA59 career field, and the ultimate result was the creation of Functional Area 59 in the United States Army about a decade later.

=== United States Army Strategists ===
By the 1990s, the U.S. Army had, for decades, provided several paths for officers to acquire an additional skill identifier which identified its holder with skills in the strategy arena. However, the resulting identifier did not equate to fully capable due to "the pressures of maintaining proficiency in traditional military skills in a limited career timeline". The Army addressed these challenges in 1998 with a "new functional area called Strategy and Force Development as part of Officer Professional Management System XXI, the redesign of its personnel system". In 2000, this functional area split, with one part becoming FA59 or "Strategic Plans and Policy". Its first officer cohort began duty in 2001. At this point, FA59 "effectively became a body of general staff officers who were specially trained in the conduct of strategic art".

U.S. Army strategists had four functions as of 2005: "strategic appraisal; strategic and operational planning; joint, interagency, intergovernmental, and multinational (JIIM) integration; and strategic education". Officers of the time were "usually educated in military history or international relations theory to improve their judgment when facing complex or poorly defined problem sets". They were also capable integrators of JIIM partners, and educators.

By 2010, analysis provided some evidence for a decline in strategic competency in the United States over multiple decades. However, Moore indicated that the "return of the Army Strategist" was already reversing this process. At the time, there were over 400 strategists serving in diverse positions including Army and Joint commands as well as the U.S. government interagency such the Departments of State and Treasury. (Note: Moore stated that strategists served "on the National Security Council, Joint Staff, Army Staff, Office of the Secretary of Defense, and recently at the Treasury and State Departments".) Additionally in 2010, the FA59 career field was redesignated from Strategic Plans and Policy to Strategist.

== Purpose ==
According to Colonel Francis Park, Director of the Basic Strategic Art Program in 2021, the purpose of the Strategist functional area is to provide competent military strategists, but the "general competencies [of a military strategist] are not intended to be the same" since military strategists, notably commanders, can come from across the force. Army Strategists "form a core of skilled practitioners who support ... strategic leaders with a variety of activities". Moore also notes that, as strategic practitioners, "Army Strategists provide a strategic perspective on complex problems and help create national and regional strategic guidance. They are instrumental in the translation of that guidance into actionable plans at the theater-strategic and operational-levels of war."

Additionally, a focus on tactics versus strategic vision has caused challenges in recent historical cases. In a 1995 monograph, Major General Richard A. Chilcoat observed a tendency in military officers of focusing on tactical and operational aspects of problems, even in strategic settings. A RAND Corporation study of U.S. operations following Operation Iraqi Freedom had a similar finding—"a tendency to focus on tactical issues rather than strategic factors"—as well as other challenges related to strategic planning and strategic art across the U.S. government. Park echoed this, noting: "One observation that emerged from those conflicts [Afghanistan and Iraq] is that a singular focus on tactics is simply not enough to achieve more than localized success in engagements and battles."

== Characteristics ==
Francis Park states that military strategists must be able to bridge both policy and strategy (strategic art) as well as strategy and tactics (operational art). This allows balancing of ends, ways, means, and risk.

"FA 59 officers are expert in the strategic appraisal and planning functions."

— Francis Park, Director, Basic Strategic Art Program.

Army Strategists are often confused for graduates of the Army's School of Advanced Military Studies (SAMS), given some overlap between the courses. (Note: About 15 percent of FA59 officers have graduated from SAMS.) However, while SAMS focuses on planning and operations up to the operational level, FA59s focus on "strategic appraisal and planning at the political and military nexus".

Moore identifies that the ability to plan and think critically and creatively are central to the strategist’s abilities, noting that strategists are expected to lead planning and develop strategy at combatant commands and multinational headquarters, as well as assist in the creation of national-level strategic documents such as the National Defense Strategy and National Military Strategy.

== Selection ==
Officers volunteer to become Army Strategists from their basic branch. A selection board chooses from among the available applicants to meet operational requirements. Most officers transition in this method. An additional four officers per year compete for the Harvard Strategist Fellowship Program. Those selected serve as Army Strategists after attendance at Harvard University. Although relying on volunteers can result in an occasional mismatch, “This method capitalizes on a vital characteristic of strategic practitioners—lifelong self-development and an intellectual fervor that fosters long-term learning.”

== Development ==
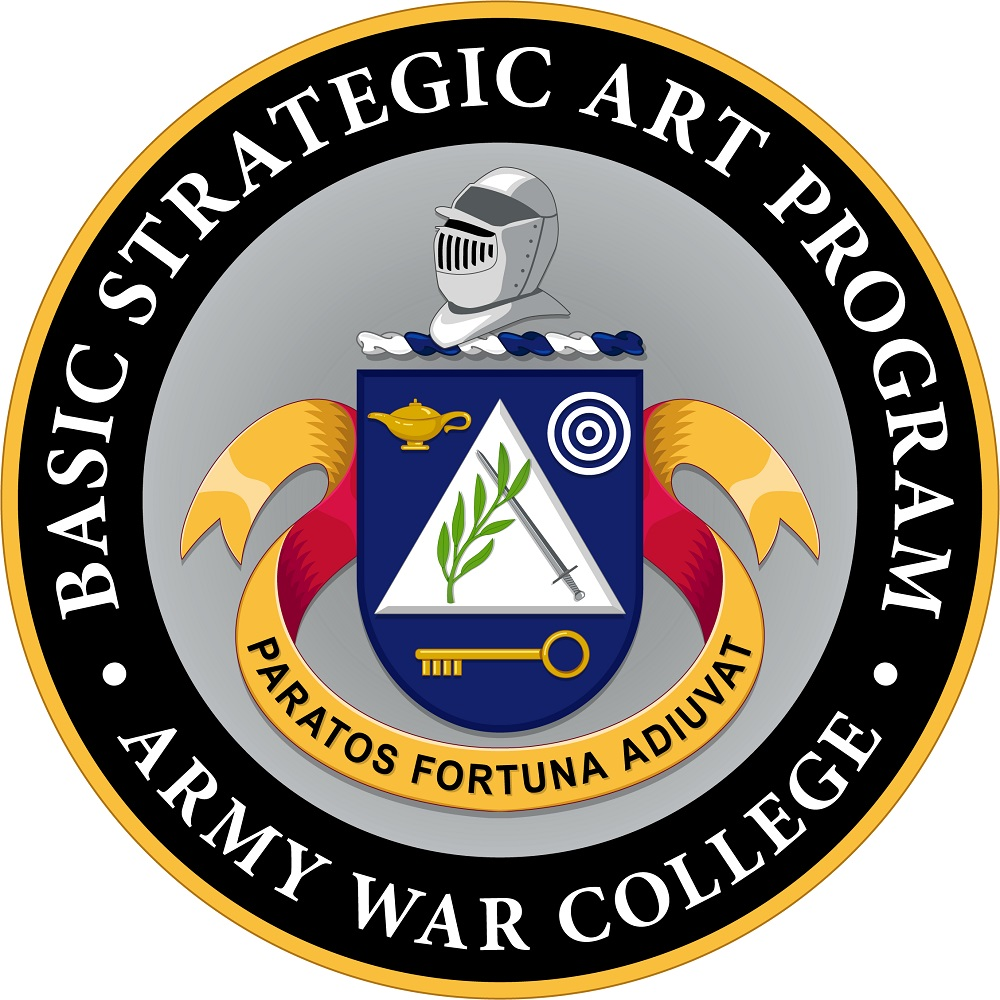
Seal of the Basic Strategic Art Program.

Although Galvin and Chilcoat believed officers could serve as both strategist and commanders, policy in the 21st century is for FA59s to not command. Moore states that "repeated strategic-level assignments provide the cornerstone of their development as strategists and set them apart from their contemporaries". According to Moore, Galvin's "vision for how strategists should be developed is largely realized in the Army's current model".

According to Park, the three parts of a military strategist's education include "civilian education, professional military education, and relevant experience". He provides three tiers of competency for a military strategist. The first is untrained, which includes FA59s who have recently graduated the Basic Strategic Art Program." Army strategists have a variety of other possible schools to attend beyond the basic requirements of Intermediate Level Education, to include "numerous service, joint, and international military schools", civilian schooling, senior service colleges for some, and others. Civilian school opportunities include Harvard University, Johns Hopkins University, and others for master’s and doctoral degrees. (Note: Moore also states that "nearly half of each cohort will graduate from an elite university and every participant receives the opportunity for a broad liberal education at a civilian university".)

The second tier of competency for a strategist is the "apprentice" who is more accomplished in civilian and military education as well as relevant assignments. There is no standard career path for the Army strategist, and their assignments will contribute toward their professional development and promoting "a deep understanding of national defense issues and processes".

The "master military strategist" has significant experience, understanding, and leadership ability in relevant areas and will work for strategic 4-star military leaders and civilian leaders. Development of a master strategist is a lengthy process. Moore echoes this, noting that "creating expert practitioners requires time". Former Chairman of the Joint Chiefs of Staff General Martin E. Dempsey also stated in 2011 that developing strategic leaders "is a careerlong process that begins early".

== Organization ==
In the 21st century, U.S. Army strategists serve in diverse assignments. These include various offices in the service staffs, the Joint Staff, the Office of the Secretary of Defense, combatant commands and subunified commands. Examples of current assignments include "lead authors for the Army Campaign Plan, division chiefs of war plans and strategy on the Army Staff", and planning chiefs at various levels. Others will serve as "speechwriters, members of commander's internal think tanks, or as military assistants to senior defense officials".

According to Moore, "The demand for Army strategists continues to increase." He adds that:

[O]ther government agencies have realized the value of these strategists. Interagency demand for strategists currently exceeds Army supply; the Departments of State, Treasury, and Homeland Security are actively seeking strategists to enhance their planning capabilities.
