= Civil control of the military =

Doctrine concerning civil authority over military decisions

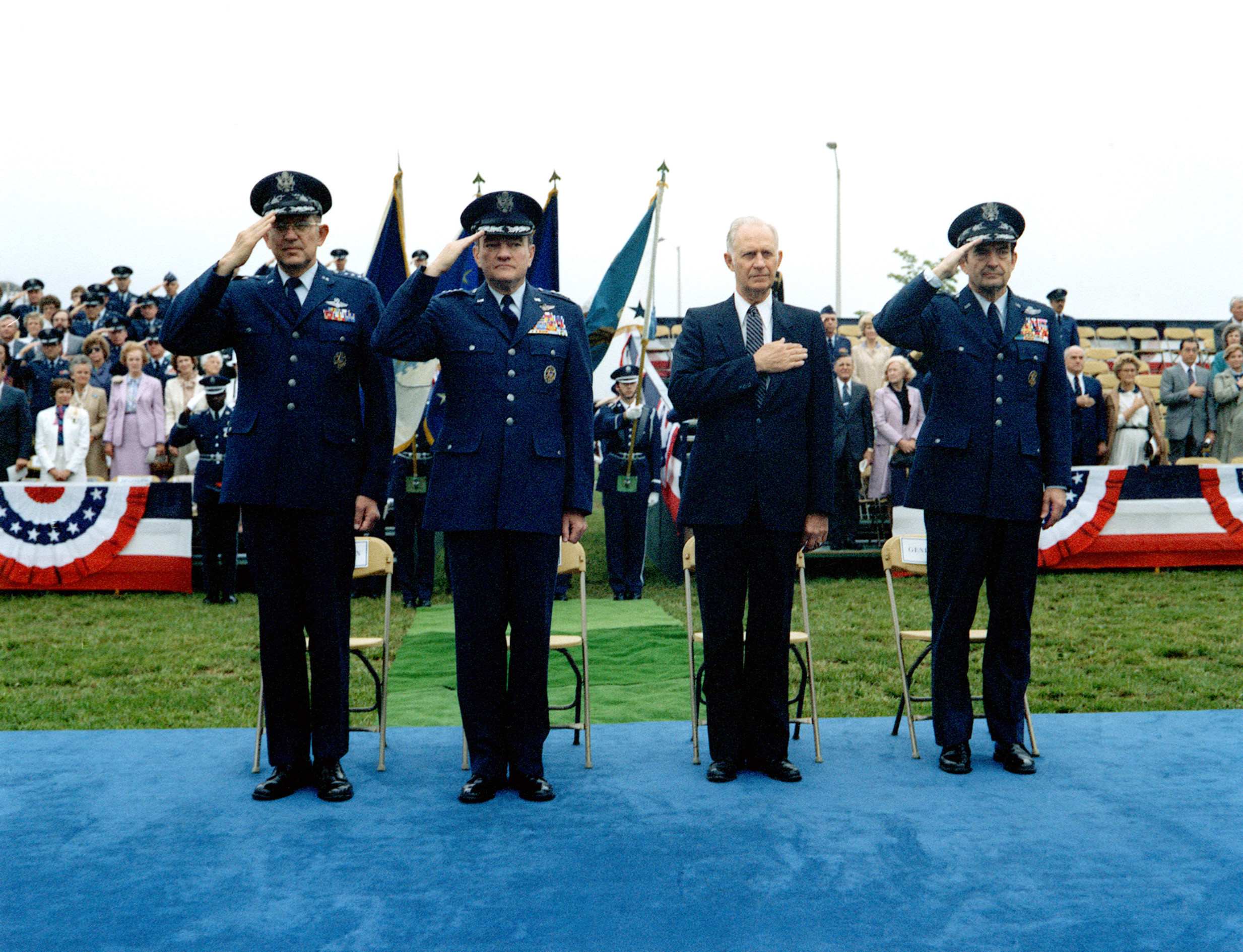
Secretary of the Air Force Verne Orr with Chairman of The Joint Chiefs of Staff General David C. Jones and Air Force Chief of Staff General Lew Allen and Air Force Vice Chief of Staff General Robert C. Mathis at a ceremony in Bolling Air Force Base in 1982. In this capacity the Secretary of the Air Force served as the civilian head of the Department of the Air Force which includes the U.S. Air Force and Space Force. As the civilian head, the Secretary of the Air Force also oversaw most of the Department of the Air Force operational and day-to-day activities. The service chiefs which include The Air Force Chief of Staff and Chief of Space Operations also reported directly to the Secretary of the Air Force, but not the Chairman of the Joint Chiefs of Staff. Although the Chairman of the Joint Chiefs of Staff can be a four-star General from either the Air Force or the Space Force, the Chairman of The Joint Chiefs of Staff reports directly to The Secretary of Defense and President of the United States, due to their status as the highest-ranking and most senior military officer in the United States Armed Forces.

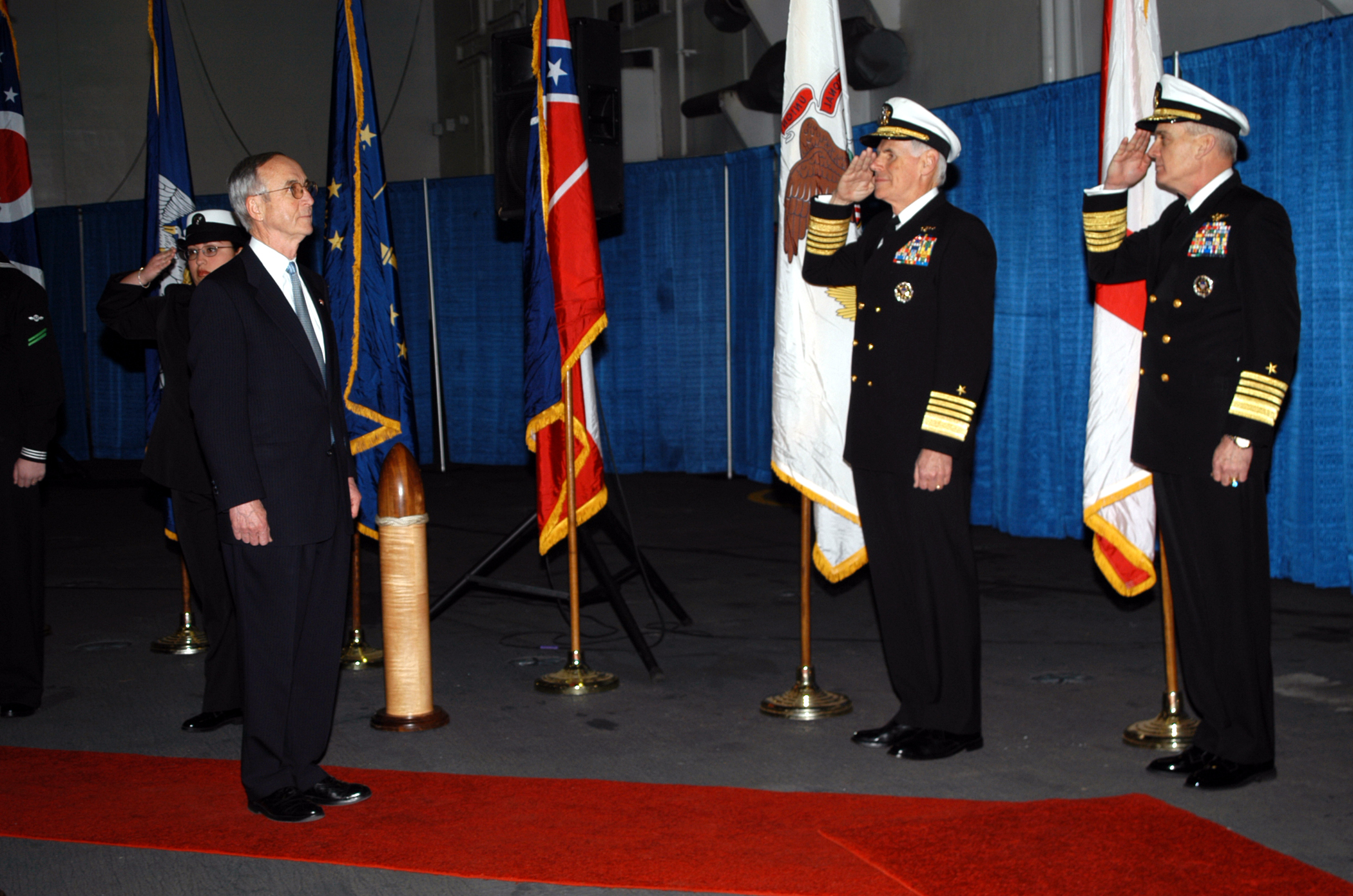
Admiral John B. Nathman (far right) and Admiral William J. Fallon salute during honors arrival of Secretary of the Navy Gordon R. England at a change of command ceremony in 2005. A subordinate of the civilian Secretary of Defense, the Secretary of the Navy is the civilian Head of the Department of the Navy, which includes the U.S. Navy and the Marine Corps.

Civil control of the military is a doctrine in military and political science that places ultimate responsibility for a country's military strategic decision-making in the hands of the civil authority, rather than with the military leadership itself.

Civil oversight over militaries, mainly used in democratic governments, puts the power to take military action in the hands of a civil leader or legislative agency. Allowing the civil component of government to retain control over the military or state security shows a healthy respect for democratic values and good governance. Giving power to the civil component of the government over what the military can do and how much money it can spend protects the democratic process from abuse. Nations that can achieve legitimate relationship between the two structures serves to be more effective and provide accountability between government and military. Security relies on both sides compromising on the civil and security needs to find the best resulting arrangement. Making the effectiveness of this type of arrangement does not rely on equipment quality or number of men, but how the two systems work together. A government and military must agree to confine the military to the rule of law and submit to government oversight to make an effective security apparatus possible.

Civil control is often seen as a prerequisite feature of a stable liberal democracy. Use of the term in scholarly analyses tends to take place in the context of a democracy governed by elected officials, though the subordination of the military to political control is not unique to these societies and also applies to authoritarian countries. One example is China. Mao Zedong stated that "Our principle is that the Party commands the gun, and the gun must never be allowed to command the Party," reflecting the primacy of the Chinese Communist Party over the People's Liberation Army.

As noted by University of North Carolina at Chapel Hill professor Richard H. Kohn, "civilian control is not a fact but a process". Affirmations of respect for the values of civil control notwithstanding, the actual level of control sought or achieved by the civil leadership may vary greatly in practice, from a statement of broad policy goals that military commanders are expected to translate into operational plans, to the direct selection of specific targets for attack on the part of governing politicians. National Leaders with limited experience in military matters often have little choice but to rely on the advice of professional military commanders trained in the art and science of warfare to inform the limits of policy; in such cases, the military establishment may enter the bureaucratic arena to advocate for or against a particular course of action, shaping the policy-making process and blurring civil control.

A lack of control over the military may result in a state within a state, whereas complete military control of national politics is called a military dictatorship. One author, paraphrasing Samuel P. Huntington's writings in The Soldier and the State, has summarised the civil control ideal as "The proper subordination of a competent, professional military to the ends of policy as determined by civilian authority".

== Rationales ==
Advocates of civil control generally take a Clausewitzian view of war, emphasizing its political character. In the words of Georges Clemenceau, "War is too serious a matter to entrust to military men" (Also frequently rendered as "War is too important to be left to the generals."), wryly reflects this view. Given that broad strategic decisions, such as the decision to declare a war, start an invasion, or end a conflict, have a major impact on the citizens of the country, they are seen by civil control advocates as best guided by the will of the people (As expressed by their political representatives), rather than left solely to an elite group of tactical experts. The military serves as a special government agency, which is supposed to implement, rather than formulate, policies that require the use of certain types of physical force. Richard Kohn, Professor Emeritus of History at UNC, summarises,

"The point of civilian control is to make security subordinate to the larger purposes of a nation, rather than the other way around. The purpose of the military is to defend society, not to define it."

A state's effective use of force is an issue of great concern for all national leaders, who must rely on the military to supply this aspect of their authority. The danger of granting military leaders full autonomy or sovereignty is that they may ignore or supplant the democratic decision making process, and use physical force, or the threat of physical force, to achieve their preferred outcomes; in the worst cases, this may lead to a coup or military dictatorship. A related danger is the use of the military to crush domestic political opposition through intimidation or sheer physical force, interfering with the ability to have free and fair elections, a key part of the democratic process. This poses the paradox that "Because we fear others we create an institution of violence to protect us, but then we fear the very institution we created for protection". For example, in the Empire of Japan, the Prime Minister and politicians were not allowed to exercise authority over the Imperial Army and Navy under the supreme command authority. This was considered an "Interference with the supreme command authority" and was said to violate the Emperor's sovereignty. As a result, even if the local military ran wild or an armed conflict broke out, as in the Manchurian Incident in 1931 and the border conflict with the Soviet Union in 1939, the Cabinet had no choice but to ultimately approve, even if it expressed concerns. Even General Tojo Hideki, who held the dual roles of Prime Minister and Minister of the Army, could not directly intervene in operational command, as it was under the jurisdiction of the General Staff. For this reason, Tojo attempted to unify state affairs and supreme command by taking on the dual role of Chief of the General Staff in 1944, but was not successful.

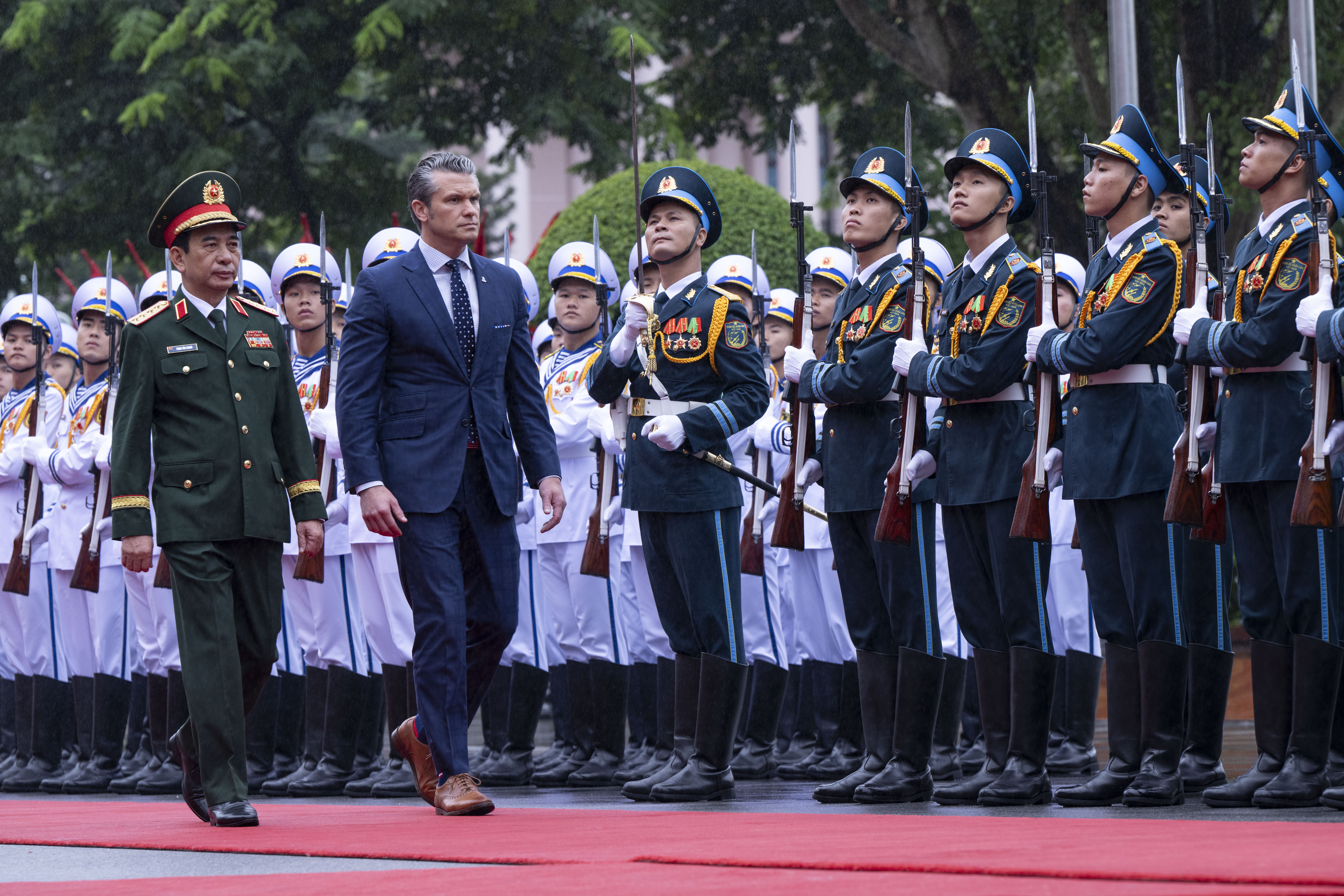
Vietnamese Minister of Defence Phan Văn Giang alongside U.S. Secretary of Defense Pete Hegseth. While the Vietnamese position is always a military officer holding the army general rank, his American counterpart is nominally civilian, with Hegseth himself having retired from formal armed forces' services years before becoming the SecDef/SecWar. Despite different design and identity, they seemed externally-equivalent and both holding the second-highest in their military's command hierarchy.

According to a study of South Korea, the military is responsible for enacting the policy and decisions handed down from the government. This is dependent on the civil government maintaining a strong grip on the power to enact binding decisions and the military following these decisions in the agreed approach. Civil control is the authority of a nation's political structure to make policy and implementation decisions that can be directed to the military to enact and then oversee throughout.

=== Liberal theory and the American Founding Fathers ===
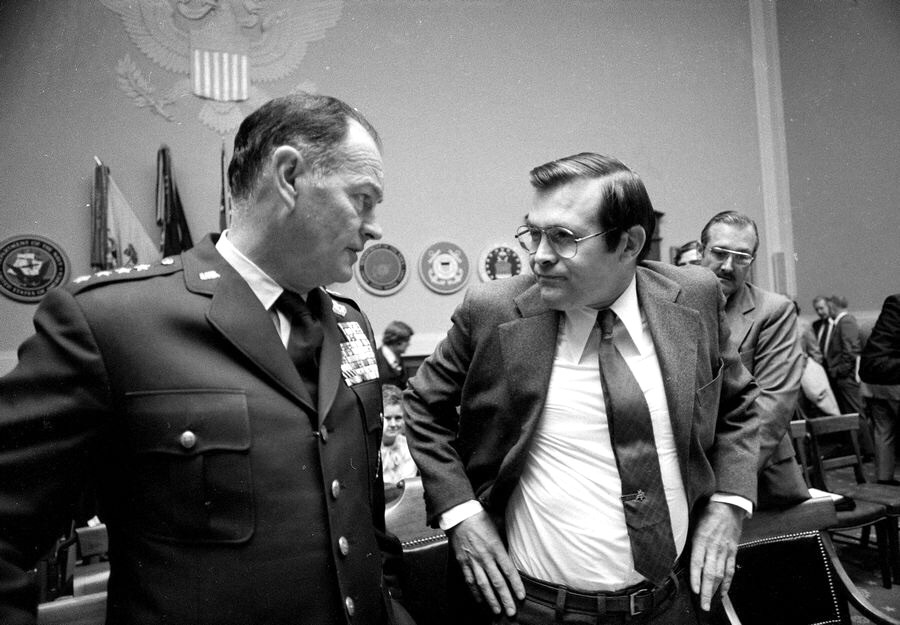
Secretary of Defense Donald H. Rumsfeld with Chairman of the Joint Chiefs of Staff General George S. Brown. While the Chairman of the Joint Chiefs of Staff acts as the highest-ranking and most senior military officer in the United States Armed Forces, the civilian Secretary of Defense acts as the highest-ranking and most senior position within the Department of Defense.

Many of the Founding Fathers of the United States were suspicious of standing militaries. As Samuel Adams wrote in 1768, "Even when there is a necessity of the military power, within a land, a wise and prudent people will always have a watchful and jealous eye over it". Even more forceful are the words of Elbridge Gerry, a delegate to the Constitutional Convention, who wrote that "[s]tanding armies in time of peace are inconsistent with the principles of republican Governments, dangerous to the liberties of a free people, and generally converted into destructive engines for establishing despotism."

In Federalist No. 8, one of The Federalist Papers documenting the ideas of some of the Founding Fathers, Alexander Hamilton expressed concern that maintaining a large standing army would be a dangerous and expensive undertaking. In his principal argument for the ratification of the proposed constitution, he argued that only by maintaining a strong union could the new country avoid such a pitfall. Using the European experience as a negative example and the British experience as a positive one, he presented the idea of a strong nation protected by a navy with no need of a standing army. The implication was that control of a large military force is, at best, difficult and expensive, and at worst invites war and division. He foresaw the necessity of creating a civil government that kept the military at a distance.

James Madison, another writer of many of The Federalist Papers, expressed his concern about a standing military in comments before the Constitutional Convention in June 1787:

In time of actual war, great discretionary powers are constantly given to the Executive Magistrate. Constant apprehension of War, has the same tendency to render the head too large for the body. A standing military force, with an overgrown Executive, will not long be safe companions to liberty. The means of defense against foreign danger, have been always the instruments of tyranny at home. Among the Romans it was a standing maxim to excite a war, whenever a revolt was apprehended. Throughout all Europe, the armies kept up under the pretext of defending, have enslaved the people.

The United States Constitution placed considerable limitations on the legislature. Coming from a tradition of legislative superiority in government, many were concerned that the proposed Constitution would place so many limitations on the legislature that it would become impossible for such a body to prevent an executive from starting a war. Hamilton argued in Federalist No. 26 that it would be equally as bad for a legislature to be unfettered by any other agency and that restraints would actually be more likely to preserve liberty. James Madison, in Federalist No. 47, continued Hamilton's argument that distributing powers among the various branches of government would prevent any one group from gaining so much power as to become unassailable. In Federalist No. 48, however, Madison warned that while the separation of powers is important, the departments must not be so far separated as to have no ability to control the others.

Finally, in Federalist No. 51, Madison argued that to create a government that relied primarily on the good nature of the incumbent to ensure proper government was folly. Institutions must be in place to check incompetent or malevolent leaders. Most importantly, no single branch of government ought to have control over any single aspect of governing. Thus, all three branches of government must have some control over the military, and the system of checks and balances maintained among the other branches would serve to help control the military.

Hamilton and Madison thus had two major concerns: (1) The detrimental effect on liberty and democracy of a large standing army, and (2) The ability of an unchecked legislature or executive to take the country to war precipitously. These concerns drove U.S. military policy for the first century and a half of the country's existence. While the armed forces were built up during wartime, the pattern after every war up to and including World War II was to demobilise quickly and return to something approaching pre-war force levels. However, with the advent of the Cold War in the 1950s, the need to create and maintain a sizable peacetime military force "engendered new concerns" of militarism and about how such a large force would affect civil–military relations in the United States.

=== Domestic law enforcement ===
The United States' Posse Comitatus Act, passed in 1878, prohibits the armed services (excluding the Coast Guard) from engaging in domestic law enforcement activities unless they do so pursuant to lawful authority.

The act is often misunderstood to prohibit any use of federal military forces in law enforcement, but this is not the case. For example, the President has explicit authority under the Constitution and federal law to use federal forces or federalised militias to enforce the laws of the United States. The act's primary purpose is to prevent local law enforcement officials from utilising federal forces in this way by forming a "posse" consisting of federal soldiers or airmen.

There are, however, practical political concerns in the United States that make the use of federal military forces less desirable for use in domestic law enforcement. Under the U.S. Constitution, law and order is primarily a matter of state concern. As a practical matter, when military forces are necessary to maintain domestic order and enforce the laws, state militia forces under state control i.e., that state's Army National Guard and/or Air National Guard are usually the force of first resort, followed by federalized state militia forces i.e., the Army National Guard and/or Air National Guard "federalized" as part of the U.S. Army and/or U.S. Air Force, with active federal forces (to include "federal" reserve component forces other than the National Guard) being the least politically palatable option.

=== NATO and EU member states ===
Strong democratic control of the military is a prerequisite for membership in NATO. Strong democracy and rule of law, implying democratic control of the military, are prerequisites for membership in the European Union.

=== Maoist approach ===
Maoist military-political theories of people's war and democratic centralism also support the subordination of military forces to the directives of the communist party (although the guerrilla experience of many early leading Chinese Communist Party figures may make their status as civilians somewhat ambiguous). In a 1929 essay On Correcting Mistaken Ideas in the Party, Mao Zedong explicitly refuted "comrades [who] regard military affairs and politics as opposed to each other and [who] refuse to recognize that military affairs are only one means of accomplishing political tasks", prescribing control of the People's Liberation Army by the CCP and greater political training of officers and enlistees as a means of reducing military autonomy. In Mao's theory, the military—which serves both as a symbol of the revolution and an instrument of the dictatorship of the proletariat—is not merely expected to defer to the direction of the ruling non-uniformed Party members (who today exercise control in the People's Republic of China through the Central Military Commission), but also to actively participate in the revolutionary political campaigns of the Maoist era.

== Methods of asserting civil control ==
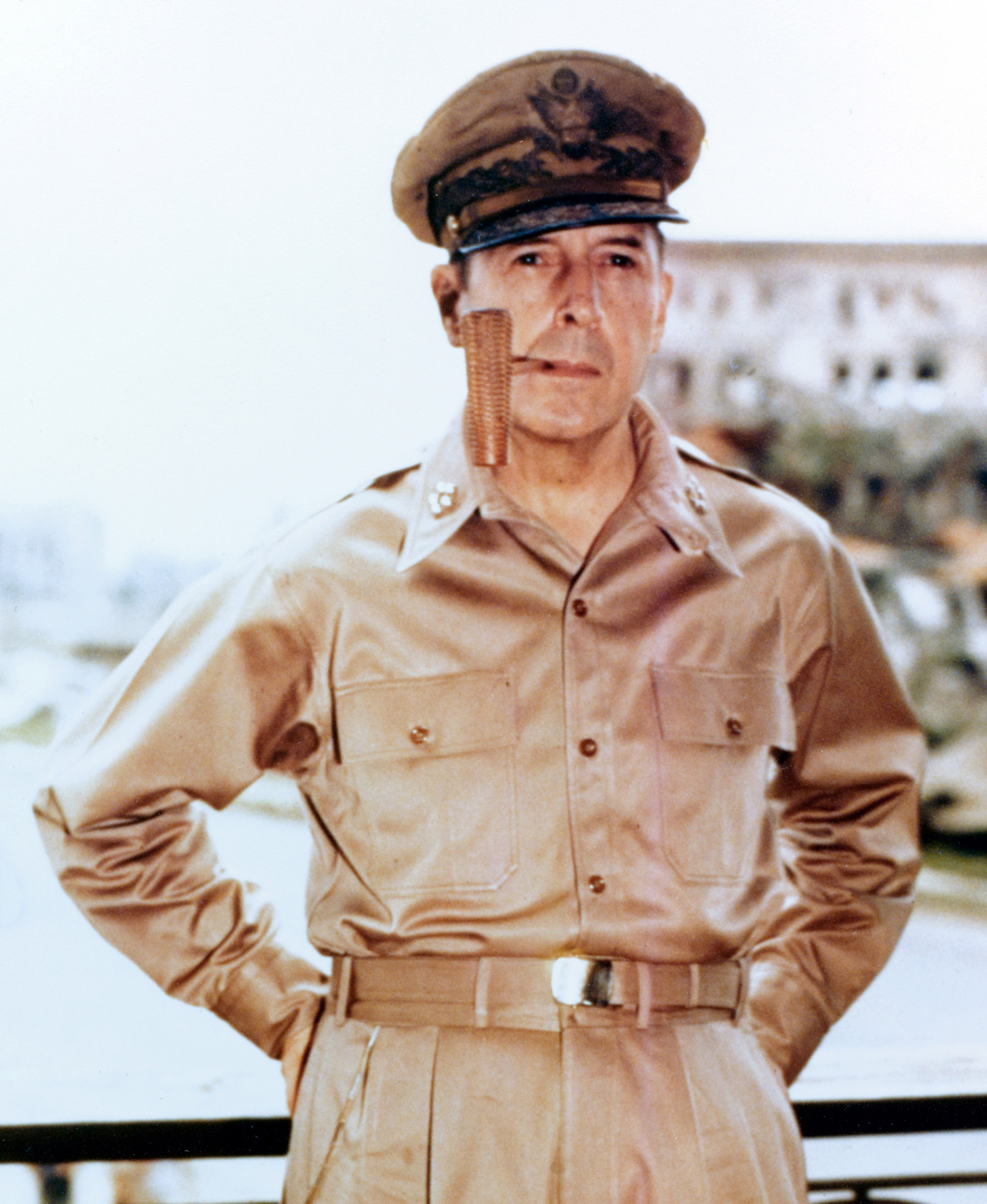
General Douglas MacArthur's public insistence on the need to expand the Korean War, over the objections of President Harry S. Truman, led to the termination of his command.

Civilian leaders cannot usually hope to challenge their militaries by means of force, and thus must guard against any potential usurpation of powers through a combination of policies, laws, and the inculcation of the values of civil control in their armed services. The presence of a distinct civilian police force, militia, or other paramilitary group may mitigate to an extent the disproportionate strength that a country's military possesses; civilian gun ownership has also been justified on the grounds that it prevents potential abuses of power by authorities (military or otherwise). Opponents of gun control have cited the need for a balance of power in order to enforce the civil control of the military.

=== A civilian commander-in-chief ===
The establishment of a civilian head of state, head of government, or other government figure as the military's commander-in-chief within the chain of command is one legal construct for the propagation of civilian control. However, in many constitutional monarchies, the monarch is both commander-in-chief and a member of the country's military, thus civil control does not necessitate complete control of only civilians.

In the United States, Article I of the Constitution gives Congress the power to declare war (in the War Powers Clause), while Article II of the Constitution establishes the President as the commander-in-chief. Ambiguity over when the President could take military action without declaring war resulted in the War Powers Resolution of 1973.

American presidents have used the power to dismiss high-ranking officers as a means to assert policy and strategic control. Examples include Abraham Lincoln's dismissal of George McClellan in the American Civil War when McClellan failed to pursue the Confederate Army of Northern Virginia following the Battle of Antietam, and Harry S. Truman relieving Douglas MacArthur of command in the Korean War after MacArthur repeatedly contradicted the Truman administration's stated policies on the war's conduct.

A major exception occurred during World War II, when Army Chief of Staff George C. Marshall displaced the civilian Secretary of War Henry L. Stimson as the most significant leader of the United States Army. Another exception occurred in the 2020-21 United States election crisis when Chairman of the Joint Chiefs of Staff Mark Milley began requiring subordinates to check with him before carrying out orders from President Donald Trump; he also called People's Liberation Army Commander-in-Chief Li Zuocheng to assure him that the United States would not launch a military strike on China and that its federal government would remain stable. Some commentators, former military officials, and Republican members of Congress criticised Milley's actions as an undermining of civil control of the military, while Milley and others defended his actions and claimed he did not overstep his authority.

=== Composition of the military ===
Differing opinions exist as to the desirability of distinguishing the military as a body separate from the larger society. In The Soldier and the State, Samuel Huntington argued for what he termed "objective civilian control", "focus[ing] on a politically neutral, autonomous, and professional officer corps". This autonomous professionalism, it is argued, best inculcates an esprit de corps and sense of distinct military corporateness that prevents political interference by sworn servicepersons. Conversely, the tradition of the citizen-soldier holds that "civilianizing" the military is the best means of preserving the loyalty of the armed forces towards civil authorities, by preventing the development of an independent "caste" of warriors that might see itself as existing fundamentally apart from the rest of society. In the early history of the United States, according to Michael Cairo,

[the] principle of civilian control... embodied the idea that every qualified citizen was responsible for the defense of the nation and the defense of liberty, and would go to war, if necessary. Combined with the idea that the military was to embody democratic principles and encourage citizen participation, the only military force suitable to the Founders was a citizen militia, which minimized divisions between officers and the enlisted.

In a less egalitarian practice, societies may also blur the line between "civilian" and "military" leadership by making direct appointments of non-professionals (frequently social elites benefitting from patronage or nepotism) to an officer rank. A more invasive method, most famously practiced in the Soviet Union and the People's Republic of China, involves active monitoring of the officer corps through the appointment of political commissars, posted parallel to the uniformed chain of command and tasked with ensuring that national policies are carried out by the armed forces. The regular rotation of soldiers through a variety of different postings is another effective tool for reducing military autonomy, by limiting the potential for soldiers' attachment to any one particular military unit. Some governments place responsibility for approving promotions or officer candidacies with the civil government, requiring some degree of deference on the part of officers seeking advancement through the ranks.

=== Technological developments ===
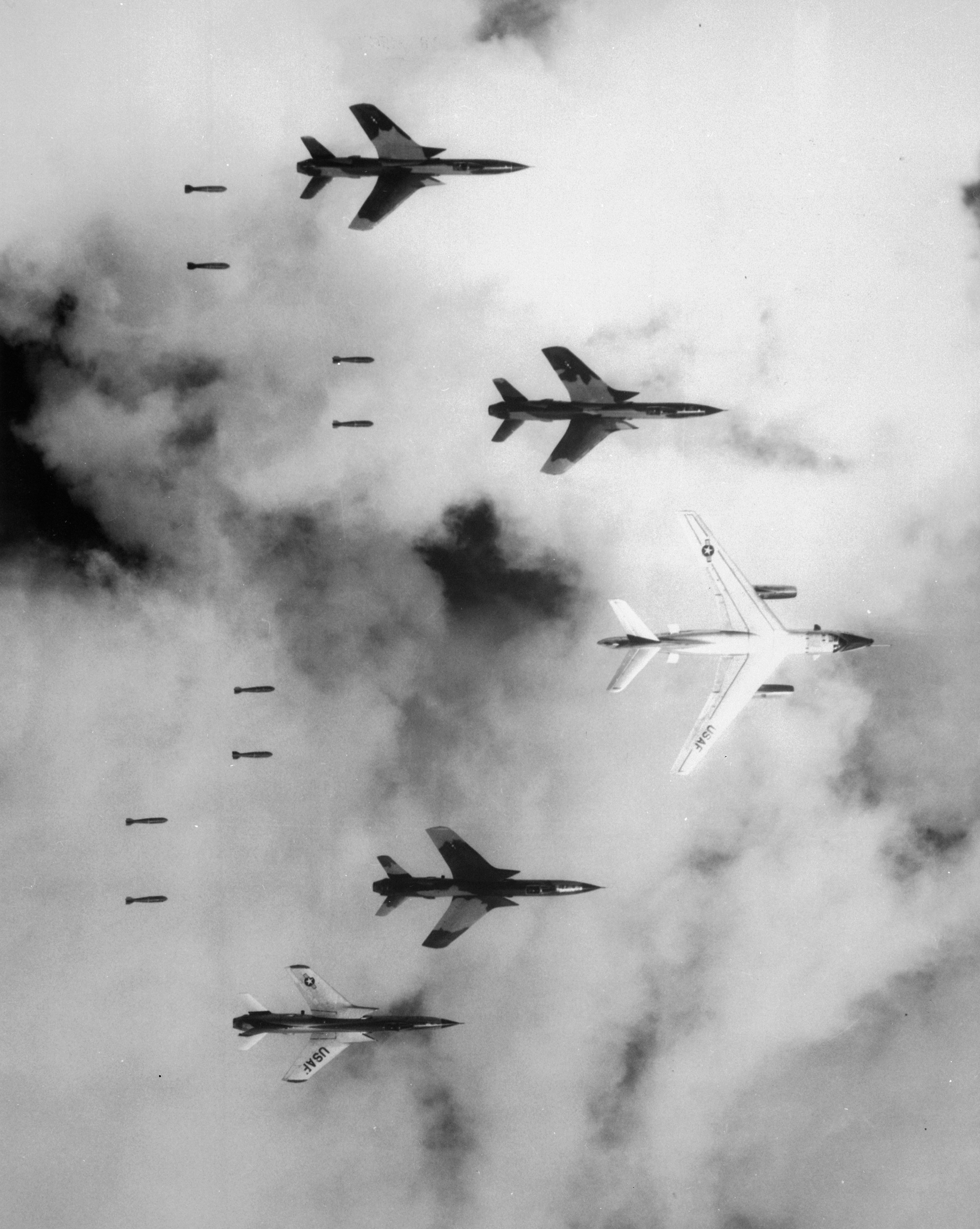
During the administration of Lyndon B. Johnson, the President and his advisors often chose specific bombing targets in Vietnam on the basis of larger geopolitical calculations, without professional knowledge of the weapons or tactics. Apropos of LBJ's direction of the bombing campaign in Vietnam, no air warfare specialists attended the Tuesday lunches at which the targeting decisions were made.

Historically, direct control over military forces deployed for war was hampered by the technological limits of command, control, and communications; national leaders, whether democratically elected or not, had to rely on local commanders to execute the details of a military campaign, or risk centrally-directed orders' obsolescence by the time they reached the front lines. The remoteness of government from the action allowed professional soldiers to claim military affairs as their own particular sphere of expertise and influence; upon entering a state of war, it was often expected that the generals and field marshals would dictate strategy and tactics, and the civilian leadership would defer to their informed judgments.

Improvements in information technology and its application to wartime command and control (a process sometimes labeled the "Revolution in Military Affairs") has allowed civilian leaders removed from the theatre of conflict to assert greater control over the actions of distant military forces. Precision-guided munitions and real-time videoconferencing with field commanders now allow the civilian leadership to intervene even at the tactical decision-making level, designating particular targets for destruction or preservation based on political calculations or the counsel of non-uniformed advisors.

=== Restrictions on political activities ===
In the United States the Hatch Act of 1939 does not directly apply to the military, however, Department of Defense Directive 1344.10 (DoDD 1344.10) essentially applies the same rules to the military. This helps to ensure a non-partisan military and ensure smooth and peaceful transitions of power.

=== Political officers ===
Political officers screened for appropriate ideology have been integrated into supervisory roles within militaries as a way to maintain the control by political rulers. Historically they are associated most strongly with the Soviet Union and China rather than liberal democracies.

== Military dislike of political directives ==
While civil control forms the normative standard in almost every society outside of military dictatorships, its practice has often been the subject of pointed criticism from both uniformed and non-uniformed observers, who object to what they view as the undue "politicisation" of military affairs, especially when elected officials or political appointees micromanage the military, rather than giving the military general goals and objectives (like "Defeat Country X"), and letting the military decide how best to carry those orders out. By placing responsibility for military decision-making in the hands of non-professional civilians, critics argue, the dictates of military strategy are subsumed to the political, with the effect of unduly restricting the fighting capabilities of the nation's armed forces for what should be immaterial or otherwise lower priority concerns.

=== Gothic Wars ===
In the wars between the Roman Empire and the Goths in Italy during the 500s CE, the incentives of the military and military necessity clashed with the incentives of the civilian leadership in Constantinople led by Emperor Justinian I. Supreme command in principle was held by the magister militum Flavius Belisarius, but his command in Italy was dissented from on a number of instances. Other representatives of the imperial court and generals allied with those representatives disagreed with Belisarius on decisions made, resulting in only a pyrrhic victory in Italy. Justinian sent a message to Belisarius while besieging Ravenna and when the Gothic garrison in the city was close to being defeated, ordering him to return East to assist with the defense of the empire against Khosrow's invasion of the Roman Empire and instructed him to agree to a peace deal with the Goths under conditions considerably favourable to the Goths, but Belisarius objected to the order and delayed his return.

It was a common issue in the Roman Empire that rebellious generals would be able to overthrow the emperor, and emperors commonly clipped the wings of generals who were too successful and too popular, one such assassination of a popular general named Vitelian occurred under the recent reign of Emperor Justin I, the uncle of Justinian. It was a particular issue in the case of Justinian as he had no biological children nor had ever legally adopted a son. During the Plague of Justinian, Belisarius was restricted to Constantinople under the influence of Empress Theodora who was concerned about the risk of a coup while Justinian was struck with a coma as a result of the epidemic.

=== Case study: United States ===
The "Revolt of the Admirals" that occurred in 1949 was an attempt by senior U.S. Navy & Marine Corps personnel, to force a change in budgets directly opposed to the directives given by the civilian leadership.

U.S. President Bill Clinton faced frequent allegations throughout his time in office (particularly after the Battle of Mogadishu) that he was ignoring military goals out of political and media pressure—a phenomenon termed the "CNN effect". Politicians who personally lack military training and experience but who seek to engage the nation in military action may risk resistance and being labeled "chickenhawks" by those who disagree with their political goals.

In contesting these priorities, members of the professional military leadership and their non-uniformed supporters may participate in the bureaucratic bargaining process of the state's policy-making apparatus, engaging in what might be termed a form of regulatory capture as they attempt to restrict the policy options of elected officials when it comes to military matters. An example of one such set of conditions is the "Weinberger Doctrine", which sought to forestall another U.S. intervention like that which occurred in the Vietnam War (which had proved disastrous for the morale and fighting integrity of the U.S. military) by proposing that the nation should only go to war in matters of "vital national interest", "as a last resort", and, as updated by Weinberger's disciple Colin Powell, with "overwhelming force". The process of setting military budgets forms another contentious intersection of military and non-military policy, and regularly draws active lobbying by rival military services for a share of the national budget.

Nuclear weapons of the United States are controlled by the civilian Department of Energy, not by the Department of Defense.

During the 1990s and 2000s, public controversy over LGBT policy in the U.S. military led to many military leaders and personnel being asked for their opinions on the matter and being given deference although the decision was ultimately not theirs to make.

During his tenure, Secretary of Defense Donald Rumsfeld raised the ire of the military by attempting to reform its structure away from traditional infantry and toward a lighter, faster, more technologically driven force. In April 2006, Rumsfeld was severely criticised by some retired military officers for his handling of the Iraq War, while other retired military officers came out in support of Rumsfeld. Although no active military officers have spoken out against Rumsfeld, the actions of these officers are still highly unusual. Some news accounts have attributed the actions of these generals to the Vietnam War experience, in which officers did not speak out against the administration's handling of military action. Later in the year, immediately after the November elections in which the Democrats gained control of Congress, Rumsfeld resigned.

== See also ==
- Armed Forces & Society
- Civil–military relations
- Civil service independence
- Deep state
- Judicial independence
- Might makes right
- Military–industrial complex
- National Security Act
- Reserve power
- Revolt of the Admirals
- Separation of powers
