= Christine Musselin =

French sociologist

- Born: February 10, 1958 (age 68); Fontenay-sous-Bois, Val-de-Marne, France

Academic background
- Education: Sciences Po Paris
- Influences: Michel Crozier

Academic work
- School or tradition: Sociology of organisations
- Main interests: Universities

Christine Musselin (French pronunciation: [kʁistin myslɛ̃]; born 10 February 1958) is a French sociologist specializing in the sociology of organizations.

From 2002 to 2010 she was the director of the Center for the Sociology of Organizations (Paris).

From 2011 to 2018 Musselin headed the research department of Sciences Po Paris.

== Select bibliography ==
- En quête d'universités, Paris, l'Harmattan, 1989, with Erhard Friedberg.
- L’État face aux universités, Paris, Anthropos, 1993, with Erhard Friedberg.
- The long March of French Universities, New York, Routledge, 2004.
- The markets for academics, New York, Routledge, 2010.
- "La grande course des universités", Paris, Presse de Sciences Po, 2017.
