= Economic warfare =

Strategy to weaken an opponent's economy

Economic warfare or economic war is an economic strategy used by belligerent states with the goal of weakening the economy of other states. This is primarily achieved by the use of economic blockades. Ravaging the crops of the enemy is a classic method, used for thousands of years.

In military operations, economic warfare may reflect economic policy followed as a part of open or covert operations, cyber operations, information operations during or preceding a war. Economic warfare aims to capture or otherwise to control the supply of critical economic resources so friendly military and intelligence agencies can use them and enemy forces cannot.

The concept of economic warfare is most applicable to total war, which involves not only the armed forces of enemy countries but also mobilized war-economies. In such a situation, damage to an enemy's economy is damage to that enemy's ability to fight a war. Scorched-earth policies may deny resources to an invading enemy.

Policies and measures in economic warfare may include blockade, blacklisting, preclusive purchasing, rewards and the capturing or the control of enemy assets or supply lines. Other policies may include tariff discrimination, sanctions, the suspension of aid, the freezing of capital assets, the prohibition of investment and other capital flows, expropriation, and debasing the target's currency by counterfeiting.

== History ==
Agriculture in ancient Greece was subject to ravaging of the crops by enemy armies. This was done to loot a valuable item, to starve the victims, and to intimidate and deter them.

=== Crusades ===
In his Book on the Recovery of the Holy Land, Fidentius of Padua provides prescriptions for economic warfare to be waged against the Mamluk sultanate of Egypt in furtherance of the Crusades. He envisions a fleet of 40–50 galleys to enforce a blockade on trade between Europe and Egypt. He sees the trade as helping Egypt in two ways: it obtains war materiel (iron, tin, timber, oil) from Europe and dues on goods brought in via the Red Sea from Asia for trade to Europe. If the spice trade were deflected from the Red Sea to Mongol Persia, Egypt would be deprived of customs duties and lose export markets because of the reduction in shipping. That may also make it unable to afford more slave soldiers imported via the Black Sea slave trade.

=== Seven Years' War ===
During the Seven Years' War of 1756 to 1763, the Kingdom of Prussia occupied Saxony and used its mint to debase both the Saxon and Polish-Lithuanian currencies.

=== American Civil War ===
Union forces in the American Civil War of 1861 to 1865 had the challenge of occupying and controlling the 11 states of the Confederacy, a vast area larger than Western Europe. The Confederate economy proved surprisingly vulnerable.

Guerrilla warfare in the American Civil War was supported by a large fraction of the Confederate population that provided food, horses, and hiding places for official and unofficial Confederate units. The Union response was to ravage the local economy, as in the Burning Raid of 1864 and on a bigger scale, Sherman's March to the Sea. Before the war, most passenger and freight traffic had moved by water through the river system or coastal ports. Confederate railroads were already inadequate and suffered much damage during the fighting. Travel became far more difficult.

Having crippled Confederate foreign trade by imposing the Union blockade with its blue-water fleet, the Union Navy built a riverine Mississippi River Squadron of small powerful gunboats to take control of the main southern rivers. Land transportation was contested, as Confederate supporters tried to block shipments of munitions, reinforcements and supplies through West Virginia, Kentucky, and Tennessee to Union forces in the south. Both sides burned bridges, tore up railroad tracks, and cut telegraph lines. They effectively ruined the infrastructure of the Confederacy.

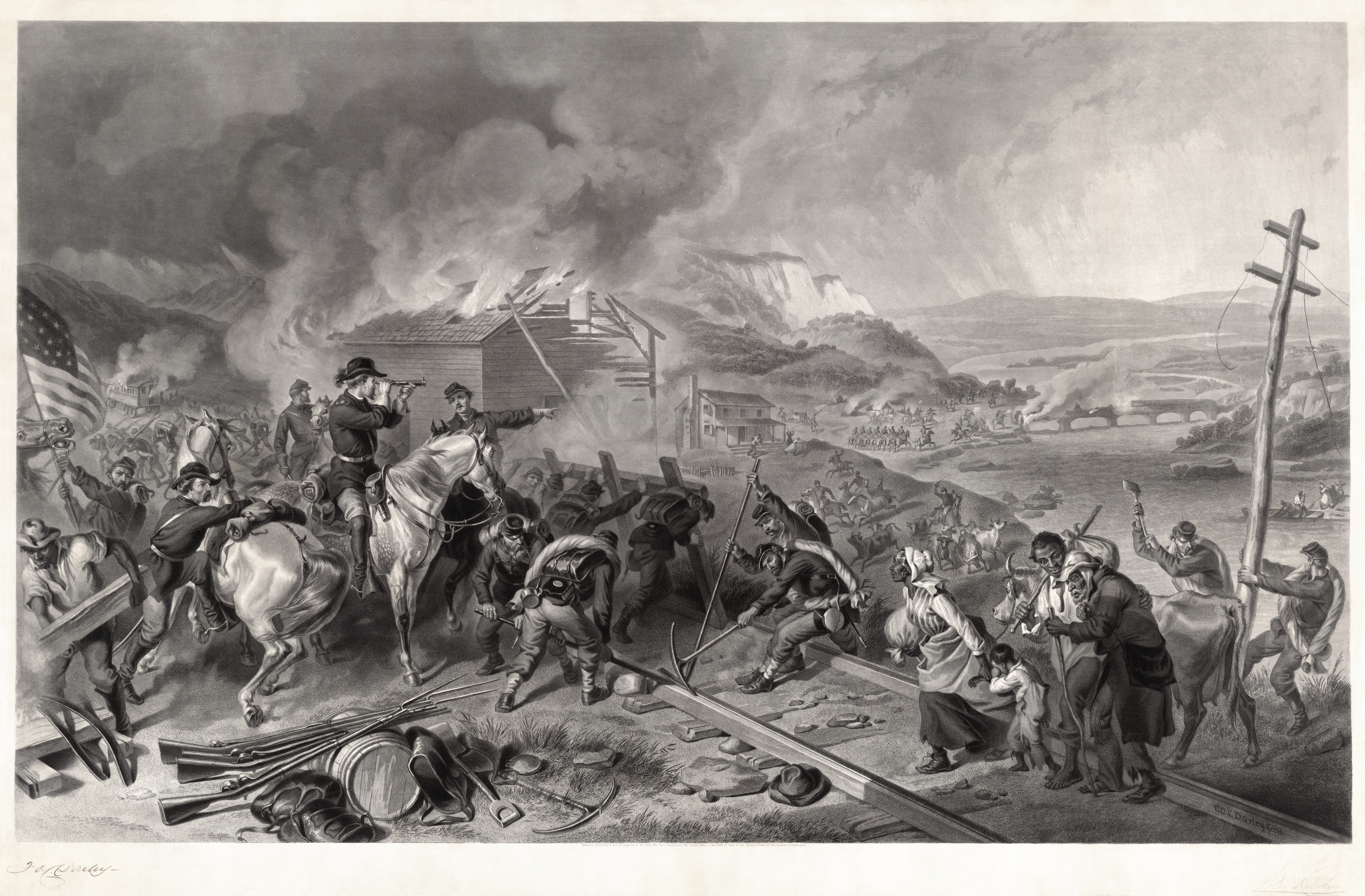
Union soldiers destroying telegraph poles and railroads in Georgia, 1864

The Confederacy in 1861 had 297 towns and cities with a total population of 835,000 people, 162 of which were at one point occupied by Union forces, involving a total population of 681,000 people. In practically every case, infrastructure was damaged, and trade and economic activity was disrupted for a while. Eleven cities were severely damaged by war action, including Atlanta, Charleston, Columbia, and Richmond. The rate of damage in smaller towns was much lower, with severe damage to 45 out of a total of 830.

Farms went into disrepair, and the prewar stock of horses, mules, and cattle was much depleted; 40% of the South's livestock was killed. The South's farms were not highly mechanized, but the value of farm implements and machinery in the 1860 census was $81 million and had been reduced by 40% by 1870. The transportation infrastructure lay in ruins, with little railroad or riverboat service available to move crops or animals to market. Railroad mileage was located mostly in rural areas, and over two thirds of the South's rails, bridges, rail yards, repair shops, and rolling stock were in areas reached by Union armies, which systematically destroyed what they could. Even in untouched areas, the lack of maintenance and repair, the absence of new equipment, the heavy overuse, and the relocation of equipment by the Confederacy from remote areas to the war zone ensured that the system would be ruined at war's end.

The enormous cost of the Confederate war effort took a high toll on the South's economic infrastructure. The direct costs to the Confederacy in human capital, government expenditures, and physical destruction totaled perhaps $3.3 billion. By 1865, the Confederate dollar was worthless because of high inflation, and people in the South had to resort to bartering for goods or services to use scarce Union dollars. With the emancipation of the slaves, the entire economy of the South had to be rebuilt. Having lost their enormous investment in slaves, white planters had minimal capital to pay freedmen workers to bring in crops. As a result, a system of sharecropping developed in which landowners broke up large plantations and rented small lots to the freedmen and their families. The main feature of the Southern economy changed from an elite minority of landed gentry slaveholders to a tenant farming agriculture system. The disruption of finance, trade, services, and transportation nodes severely disrupted the pre-war agricultural system and impoverished the entire region for generations.

=== World War I ===
The British used their greatly-superior Royal Navy to cause a tight blockade of Germany and a close monitoring of shipments to neutral countries to prevent them from being transshipped to there. Germany could not find enough food since its younger farmers were all in the army, and the desperate Germans were eating turnips by the winter of 1916–17. US shipping was sometimes seized, and Washington protested. The British paid monetary compensation so that the American protests would not escalate into serious trouble.

=== World War II ===
Clear examples of economic warfare occurred during World War II when the Allied powers followed policies to deprive the Axis economies of critical resources. The British Royal Navy again blockaded Germany although with much more difficulty than in 1914. The US Navy, especially its submarines, cut off shipments of oil and food to Japan.

In turn, Germany attempted to damage the Allied war effort via submarine warfare: the sinking of transport ships carrying supplies, raw materials, and essential war-related items such as food and oil. As the Allied air forces grew, they mounted the oil campaign of World War II to deprive Germany of fuel. Especially sensitive to the issue of petroleum shortages for the Axis, Soviet forces sabotaged the Maykop oil fields in the Caucasus prior to their occupation by the Wehrmacht in August 1942, blocked the Axis's Fall Blau attempted seizure of the oil resources around Baku (Operation Edelweiss) in the northern-hemisphere autumn of 1942 and occupied the Ploiești oil field in Romania — the Axis's last major remaining oil resource — immediately after Romania joined the Allies in August 1944.

Neutral countries continue to trade with both sides. The Royal Navy could not stop land-based trade, so the Allies made other efforts to cut off sales to Germany of critical minerals such as tungsten, chromium, mercury and iron ore from Spain, Portugal, Turkey, Sweden and elsewhere. Germany wanted Spain to enter the war but they could not agree to terms. To keep Germany and Spain apart, Britain used a carrot-and-stick approach. Britain provided oil and closely monitored Spain's export trade. It outbid Germany for the tungsten, whose price soared, and by 1943, tungsten was Spain's biggest export-earner. Britain's cautious treatment of Spain brought conflict with the more aggressive American policy. In the Wolfram Crisis of 1944 Washington cut off oil supplies but then agreed with London's requests to resume oil shipments. Portugal feared a German-Spanish invasion, but when that became unlikely in 1944, it virtually joined the Allies.

== Cold War ==
During the Malayan Emergency (1948–1960), the British military deployed herbicides and defoliants in the Malaysian countryside (including crop fields) in order to deprive Malayan National Liberation Army (MNLA) insurgents of cover, potential sources of food and to flush them out of the jungle. The herbicides and defoliants deployed by the British contained Trioxone, an ingredient which was also formed part of the chemical composition of the Agent Orange herbicide used by the U.S. military during the Vietnam War. Deployment of herbicides and defoliants served the dual purpose of thinning jungle trails to prevent ambushes and destroying crop fields in regions where the MNLA was active to deprive them of potential sources of food. Herbicides and defoliants were also sprayed from Royal Air Force (RAF) aircraft.

On 17 November 1953, the Greek National Intelligence Service (KYP) proposed conducting tax audits on suspected communist book publishers and cinema owners, censoring Soviet movies and promoting Soviet films of particularly low quality. In 1959, KYP launched exhibitions of Soviet products in Volos, Thessaloniki and Piraeus. The bulk of the products were cheap and defective, purposefully selected to tarnish the Soviet Union's image.

During the Vietnam War, between 1962 and 1971, the United States military sprayed nearly 20,000,000 U.S. gallons (76,000 m^{3}) of various chemicals – the "rainbow herbicides" and defoliants – in Vietnam, eastern Laos, and parts of Cambodia as part of Operation Ranch Hand, reaching its peak from 1967 to 1969. For comparison purposes, an olympic size pool holds approximately 660,000 U.S. gal (2,500 m^{3}). As the British did in Malaysia, the goal of the U.S. was to defoliate rural/forested land, depriving guerrillas of food and concealment and clearing sensitive areas such as around base perimeters. Samuel P. Huntington argued that the program was also a part of a general policy of forced draft urbanization, which aimed to destroy the ability of peasants to support themselves in the countryside, forcing them to flee to the U.S.-dominated cities, depriving the guerrillas of their rural support base.

== French Economic Warfare School ==
Christian Harbulot, the director of the Economic Warfare School in Paris, provides an historical reconstruction of the economic balance of power between states. In his study, he demonstrates that the strategies that states put in place to increase their economic power and their impact on the international balance of power can be interpreted only by the concept of economic warfare.

== Economic sanctions ==
The Covenant of the League of Nations provided for military and economic sanctions against aggressor states, and the idea of economic sanctions was regarded as a great innovation. However, economic sanctions without military ones failed to dissuade Italy from conquering Abbysinia.

In 1973–1974, the oil-producing Arab states imposed an oil embargo against the United States, the United Kingdom, Canada, South Africa, Japan, and other industrialized countries that supported Israel during the Yom Kippur War of October 1973. Results included the 1973 oil crisis and a sharp rise in prices but not an end to support for Israel.

Many United States government sanctions have been imposed since the mid-20th century.

- United States embargo against Cuba
- Countering America's Adversaries Through Sanctions Act
- Sanctions against North Korea

Fortress economics or a fortress economy is a phrase used in relation to the defense and sustenance of a country's economy amidst international sanctions. The term has been used in reference to Russia in 2022, Taiwan with relation to China-US relations, and Europe.

== See also ==
- Attrition warfare
- Commerce raiding
- Currency war
- Economic diplomacy
- Economic terrorism
- Economic history of World War I
  - Home front during World War I
  - Diplomatic history of World War I
- Home front during World War II
- Industrial warfare
- Merchant raider
- Resource war
- Strategic bombing
- Trade war
- Tonnage war
- Total war
- War economy
