= Protestant work ethic =

Social-theologic concept

The Protestant work ethic, also known as the Calvinist work ethic or the Puritan work ethic, is a work ethic concept in the social sciences, particularly sociology, economics, and history. It emphasizes a moral belief that a person's subscription to the values espoused by the Protestant faith, particularly Calvinism, results in diligence, discipline, and frugality. The term was initially coined by the sociologist Max Weber in his 1905 book, The Protestant Ethic and the Spirit of Capitalism. In this work, Weber asserted that Protestant ethics and values, along with the Calvinist doctrines of asceticism and predestination, was a factor in the rise and spread of modern capitalism. Just as priests and caring professionals are deemed to have a vocation (or "calling" from God) for their work, according to the Protestant work ethic, the "lowly" workman also has a noble vocation which he can fulfill through dedication to his work.

However, despite Weber's book being one of the most influential and cited in sociology, the thesis presented has been controversial since its release. In opposition to Weber, historians such as Fernand Braudel and Hugh Trevor-Roper assert that the Protestant work ethic did not create capitalism, and that capitalism developed in pre-Reformation Catholic communities. Historian Laurence R. Iannaccone has written that "the most noteworthy feature of the Protestant Ethic thesis is its absence of empirical support". The concept often helps define the self-view of societies of Northern, Central and Northwestern Europe as well as the United States.

== Weber's theory ==
Following a study trip to America, Weber developed his theory of the Protestant Ethic, which included more considerations than attitude to work. Those with the ethic believed that good fortune (e.g. from hard work) is a vindication of God in this life: a theodicy of fortune; this supported religious and social actions that proved their right to possess even greater wealth. In contrast, those without the ethic instead emphasized that God will be vindicated by granting wealth and happiness in the next life: a theodicy of misfortune. These beliefs guided expectations, behaviour and culture, etc.

== Basis in Protestant theology ==
According to the theory, Protestants, beginning with Martin Luther, conceptualized worldly work as a duty which benefits both the individual and society. Thus, the Catholic idea of good works was transformed for Protestants into an obligation to consistently work diligently as a sign of grace. Whereas Catholicism teaches that good works are required of Catholics as a necessary manifestation of the faith they received, and that faith apart from works is dead and barren, the Calvinist theologians taught that only those who were predestined to be saved would be saved.

For Protestants, salvation is a gift from God; this is the Protestant distinction of sola gratia. In light of salvation being a gift of grace, Protestants viewed work as stewardship given to them. Thus Protestants were not working in order to achieve salvation but viewed work as the means by which they could be a blessing to others. Hard work and frugality were thought to be two important applications of being a steward of what God had given them. Protestants were thus attracted to these qualities and strove to reach them.

There are many specific theological examples in the Bible used to support a work ethic. Old Testament examples abound, such as God's command in Exodus 20:8–10 to "Remember the Sabbath day, to keep it holy. Six days you shall labor, and do all your work, but the seventh day is a Sabbath to the Lord your God." Another passage from the Book of Proverbs in the Old Testament provides an example: "A little sleep, a little slumber, a little folding of the hands to rest, and poverty will come upon you like a robber, and want like an armed man."

The New Testament also provides many examples, such as the Parable of the Ten Minas in the Book of Luke.

The Apostle Paul in 2 Thessalonians said "If anyone is not willing to work, let him not eat."

== American political history ==
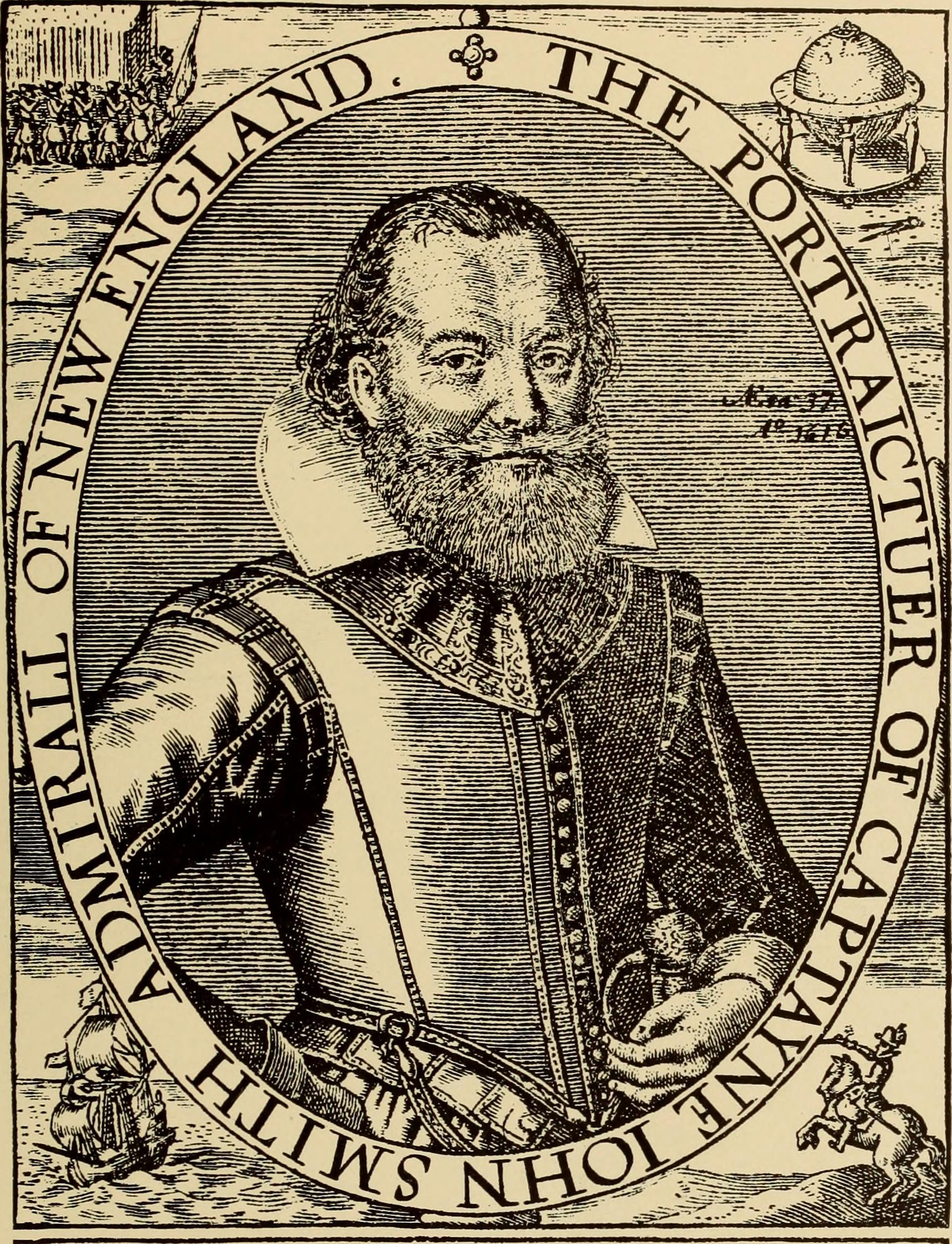
Captain John Smith, admiral of New England (1624)

In 1607, the first English settlement in America was established at Jamestown, led by John Smith. He trained the first English settlers to work at farming and fishing. These settlers were ill-equipped to survive in the English settlements in the early 1600s and were on the precipice of dying. John Smith emphasized the Protestant work ethic and helped propagate it by stating "He that will not work, shall not eat" which is a direct reference to 2 Thessalonians 3:10. This policy has been credited with helping the early colony survive and thrive in its relatively harsh environment.

In 1962, writer Frank Chodorov argued that the Protestant ethic was long considered indispensable for American political figures:

There was a time, in these United States, when a candidate for public office could qualify with the electorate only by fixing his birthplace in or near the "log cabin". He may have acquired a competence, or even a fortune, since then, but it was in the tradition that he must have been born of poor parents and made his way up the ladder by sheer ability, self-reliance, and perseverance in the face of hardship. In short, he had to be "self made". The so-called Protestant Ethic then prevalent held that man was a sturdy and responsible individual, responsible to himself, his society, and his God. Anybody who could not measure up to that standard could not qualify for public office or even popular respect. One who was born "with a silver spoon in his mouth" might be envied, but he could not aspire to public acclaim; he had to live out his life in the seclusion of his own class.

— Frank Chodorov, Out of Step

Others have rejected the notion that the Protestant work ethic explains the rise of capitalism. Civil rights activist Martin Luther King Jr. said:

We have deluded ourselves into believing the myth that capitalism grew and prospered out of the Protestant ethic of hard work and sacrifice. The fact is that capitalism was built on the exploitation and suffering of black slaves and continues to thrive on the exploitation of the poor—both black and white, here and abroad.

== Support ==
Late-20th-century works by Lawrence Harrison, Samuel P. Huntington, and David Landes revitalized interest in Weber's thesis.

In a New York Times article, published on June 8, 2003, Niall Ferguson claimed, using data from the Organisation for Economic Co-operation and Development (OECD), that "the experience of Western Europe in the past quarter-century offers an unexpected confirmation of the Protestant ethic", that the reason that people in modern Protestant Western European nations actually work fewer hours on average than in the Catholic ones or in the United States is due to a decline in active Protestantism.

=== Individuals ===
There are studies of the existence and impact of the so-called Protestant Ethic on individuals. A study at the University of Groningen shows that, psychologically, Protestants fare much worse than the general population when unemployed, with the researchers attributing that divide to intrinsic appreciation of work amongst Protestants.

=== United States ===
The original New England Colonies in 1677 were mostly Protestant in origin and exhibited industriousness and respect for laws.

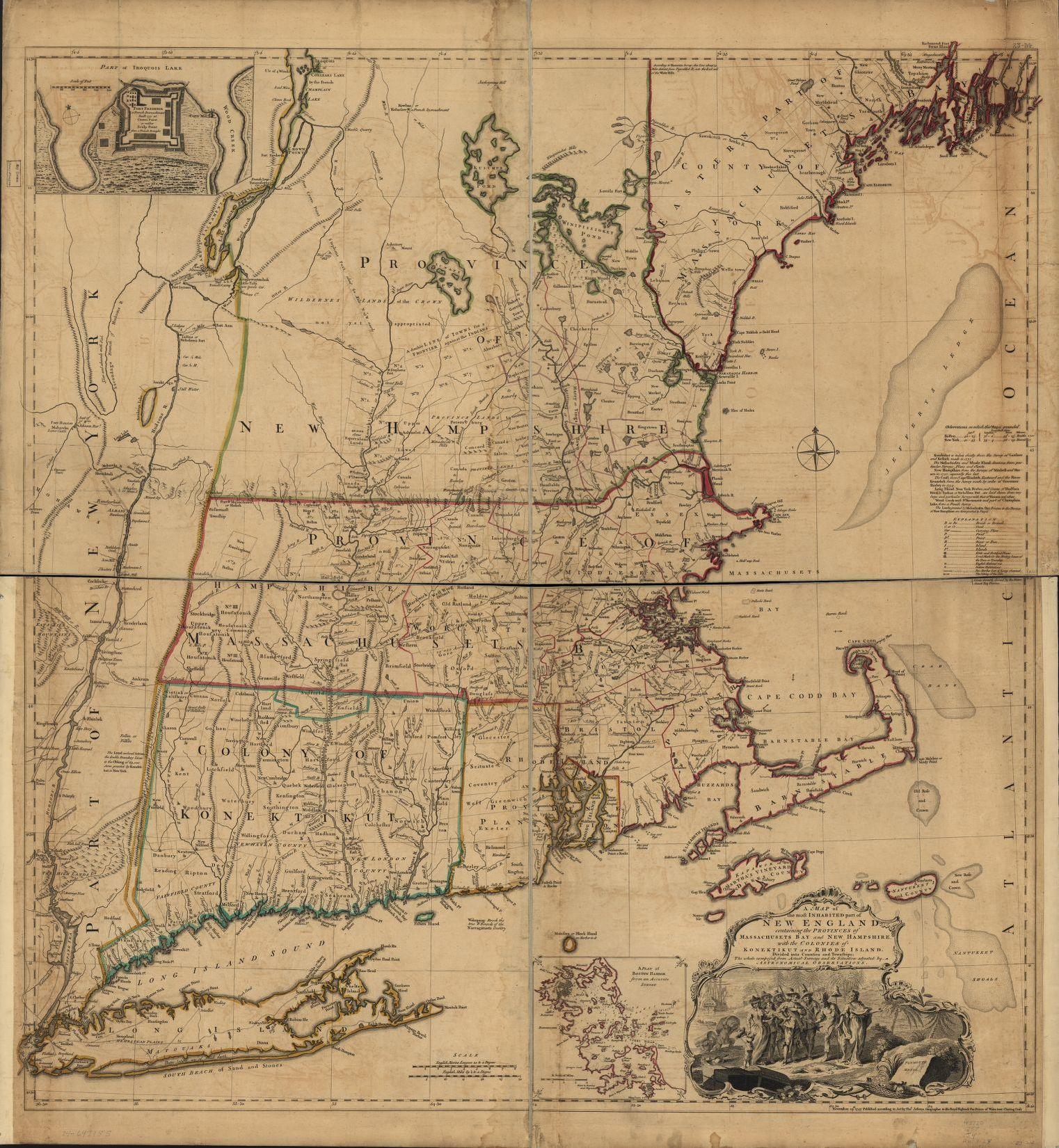
Some of the original New England Colonies in 1677

Pastor John Starke writes that the Protestant work ethic "multiplied myths about Protestantism, Calvinism, vocation, and capitalism. To this day, many believe Protestants work hard so as to build evidence for salvation."

Some support exists that the Protestant work ethic may be so ingrained in American culture that when it appears, people may not recognize it. Due to the history of Protestantism in the United States, it may be difficult to separate the successes of the country from the ethic that may have significantly contributed to propelling it.

=== Contrast with the prosperity theology ethic ===
Tshilidzi Marwala asserted in 2020 that the principles of the Protestant ethic are important for development in Africa and that they should be secularized and used as an alternative to the ethic of Prosperity Christianity, which advocates miracles as a basis of development.

In the 2019 journal article, "Pentecostalism, economics, capitalism: putting the Protestant Ethic to work," Benjamin Kirby agrees that this influence of prosperity theology, particularly within neo-Pentecostal movements, complicates any attempt to draw parallels between, first, the relationship between contemporary Pentecostalism and neoliberal capitalism, and second, the relationship between Calvinistic asceticism and modern capitalism that interested Weber. Nevertheless, Kirby emphasises the enduring relevance of Weber's analysis: he proposes a "new elective affinity" between contemporary Pentecostalism and neoliberal capitalism, suggesting that neo-Pentecostal churches may act as vehicles for embedding neoliberal economic processes, for instance by encouraging practitioners to become entrepreneurial, responsibilised citizens.

== Criticism ==
=== Historicity ===
Austrian political economist Joseph Schumpeter argued that capitalism began in Italy in the 14th century, not in the Protestant areas of Europe.

Danish macroeconomist Thomas Barnebeck Andersen et al. found that the location of monasteries of the Catholic Order of Cistercians, and specifically their density, highly correlated with this work ethic in later centuries; ninety percent of these monasteries were founded before the year 1300 AD. Economist Joseph Henrich found that this correlation extends right up to the twenty-first century.

Other factors that further developed the European market economy included the strengthening of property rights and lowering of transaction costs with the decline and monetization of feudalism, and the increase in real wages following the epidemics of bubonic plague.

Social scientist Rodney Stark commented that "during their critical period of economic development, these northern centers of capitalism were Catholic, not Protestant", with the Reformation still far off in the future. Furthermore, he also highlighted the conclusions of other historians, noting that, compared to Catholics, Protestants were "not more likely to hold the high-status capitalist positions", that Catholic Europe did not lag in its industrial development compared to Protestant areas, and that even Weber wrote that "fully developed capitalism had appeared in Europe" long before the Reformation. As British historian Hugh Trevor-Roper stated, the concept that "large-scale industrial capitalism was ideologically impossible before the Reformation is exploded by the simple fact that it existed".

French historian Fernand Braudel wrote that "all historians" opposed the "tenuous theory" of the Protestant ethic, despite not being able to entirely quash the theory "once and for all". Braudel continues to remark that the "northern countries took over the place that earlier had been so long and brilliantly been occupied by the old capitalist centers of the Mediterranean. They invented nothing, either in technology or business management".

Historian Laurence R. Iannaccone has written that "Ironically, the most noteworthy feature of the Protestant Ethic thesis is its absence of empirical support", citing the work of Swedish economic historian Kurt Samuelsson that "economic progress was uncorrelated with religion, or was temporally incompatible with Weber's thesis, or actually reversed the pattern claimed by Weber."

German economists Sascha Becker and Ludger Wößmann have posited an alternate theory, claiming that the literacy gap between Protestants (as a result of the Reformation) and Catholics was a sufficient explanation for the economic gaps, and that the "results hold when we exploit the initial concentric dispersion of the Reformation to use distance to Wittenberg as an instrument for Protestantism". However, they also note that, between Luther (1500) and Prussia during the Franco-Prussian War (1870–71), the limited data available has meant that the period in question is regarded as a "black box" and that only "some cursory discussion and analysis" is possible.

A recent study by Milan Zafirovski (2023) reviews earlier economic and sociological theories that linked Calvinism to the rise of capitalism, identifying several pre-Weberian precedents, both positive (William Petty, Montesquieu, Jean-Baptiste Say, Auguste Comte, Karl Marx, Henry Thomas Buckle, Émile de Laveleye, Matthew Arnold, Alfred Marshall and Weber's contemporaries) and negative, for the Protestant ethic thesis.

=== Modern effect ===
A 2021 study argues that the values represented by the Protestant ethic, as developed by Max Weber, are not exclusively related to Protestantism but to the modernization phase of economic development. Weber observed this phase of development in areas dominated by Protestants at the time of his observations. From these observations, he concludes that a worldly asceticism consisting of a preference for work and a sober life is associated with Protestantism. However, Dutch management economists Annemiek Schilpzand and Eelke de Jong argue that this value pattern is associated with the modernization phase of a region's economic development and thus, in principle, can be found for any religion or for non-religious persons.

A 2013 study of 44 European countries found that the religious heritage of countries explains half of the between-country variation in Europe in Work Ethic, more than modernity, while factors such as income, education, religion and (in another study) secularization explain relatively little. However, the study showed that Protestant heritage was actually the least correlated with a strong work ethic, with Muslim, then Orthodox, then Catholic heritages being the strongest.

A 2009 study of 32 mainly developed countries found no difference in work ethic between Catholics and Protestants, after correcting for demographic and country effects; however, it found substantial support for a social ethic effect due to, e.g., the Catholic attention to production within the family and to personal contacts: "Protestant values are shown to shape a type of individual who exerts greater effort in mutual social control, supports institutions more and more critically, is less bound to close circles of family and friends, and also holds more homogenous values … (which ultimately works) in favour of anonymous markets, as they facilitate legal enforcement and impersonal exchange." A similar result is in the 2003 analysis of Western Europe by Riis.

A re-examination of Weber's Protestant Ethic indicates that what was important for long-term economic growth was not a greater propensity to save and work of individual Protestants but rather the manner in which a group of Protestants interacted compared with a group of Catholics.

— Ulrich Blum, Leonard Dudley, "Religion and Economic Growth: Was Weber Right?" – Journal of Evolutionary Economics, Vol 11, issue 2, pp. 217

== See also ==
- Achievement ideology
- Anglo-Saxon economy
- Critical responses to Weber
- Critique of work
- God helps those who help themselves – Religious saying
- Imperial German influence on Chile
- Industrial Revolution
- Laziness
- Merton thesis
- Pray and work
- Predestination in Calvinism
- Prosperity theology – Material wealth-based Protestant belief
- Prussian virtues
- Refusal of work
- Right to sit
- Sloth (sin)
- Underclass
