= Erhard Friedberg =

Austrian sociologist (born 1942)

- Born: 1942 (age 83–84)
- Education: Freie Universität, West-Berlin (1979)
- Scientific career
- Fields: sociology, political science, organization theory

Erhard Friedberg is an Austrian sociologist who was born in 1942. His major contribution to organizational analysis is the conceptualization of "organized action" and a methodology to analyze it.

== Career ==
Most of his professional career has been spent in France.

From 1998 to 2007, he was the director of the Centre de sociologie des organisations, Center for the Sociology of Organizations (CSO), located in Paris, a laboratory under the joint sponsorship of CNRS and Sciences Po.

From 1998 to 2010, he was a professor of political science at Sciences Po Paris.

From 2012 to 2015, he was the program director of the School of Government and Public Policy (SGPP Jakarta / Indonésia). Since 2015, he has been an eminent visiting professor at the University of Brunei Daressalam (UBD).

== Honours ==
He is a doctor honoris causa of the University of Liege (2012).

== Publications ==
=== Books ===
He has written the following books:

- Le pouvoir et la règle. Dynamique de l'action organisée. Editions du Seuil 1993
- Observing Policy-Making in Indonesia, Approaches the world of policy-making from the perspective of implementation. (With Mary Hilderbrand) Singapore, Springer, 2017.
- Local Orders. The Dynamics of Organized Action. Translated by Emoretta Yang. Greenwich, CT: JAI Press, 1997.
- Les Politiques culturelles des villes et leurs administrateurs, (with Mario d'Angelo and Philippe Urfalino). La Documentation française, 1989 (ISBN 2-11-002257-4)
- Actors and Systems: The Politics of Collective Action. (With Michel Crozier). Chicago: University of Chicago Press, 1980.

=== Articles ===
- "Conflict of Interest from the Perspective of the Sociology of Organized Action" in Conflict of Interest in Global, Public and Corporate Governance, Anne Peters & Lukas Handschin (eds), Cambridge University Press, 2012
- "Institutional Change as an Interactive Process. The Case of the Modernization of the French Cancer Centers", with Patrick Castel in Organization Science, Mars 2010.
- "Organization and Collective Action. Our Contribution to Organizational Analysis" in S.B. Bacharach, P., Gagliardi & P. Mundell (Eds). Research in the Sociology of Organizations. Vol. XIII, Special Issue on European Perspectives of Organizational Theory, Greenwich, CT: JAI Press, 1995) Greenwich, CT
