= The Crisis of Democracy =

1975 report republished as a book

- Author: Michel Crozier, Samuel P. Huntington, Joji Watanuki
- Publisher: New York University Press; Trilateral Commission
- Publication date: 1975
- ISBN: 978-0-8147-1365-5

The Crisis of Democracy: On the Governability of Democracies is a key report written in 1975 by Michel Crozier, Samuel P. Huntington, and Joji Watanuki for the Trilateral Commission. In the same year, it was republished as a book by the New York University Press. The report observed the political state of the United States, Europe and Japan, and says that in the United States the problems of governance "stem from an excess of democracy" and thus calls for actions "to restore the prestige and authority of central government institutions".

== Overview ==
=== Europe ===
The report outlines that in 1960s Western Europe the governments are "overloaded with participants and demands" which the highly bureaucratic political systems are unable to handle, thus rendering their societies ungovernable. It points to a political decision made by France that was made in "semisecret, without open political debate, but with a tremendous amount of lobbying and intrabureaucratic conflict."

=== United States ===
The vitality of democracy in the United States in the 1960s produced a substantial increase in governmental activity and a substantial decrease in governmental authority.

— Samuel P. Huntington

The report says the problems of the United States in the 1960s stemmed from the "impulse of democracy ... to make government less powerful and more active, to increase its functions, and to decrease its authority" and concludes that these demands are contradictory. The impulse for the undermining of legitimacy was said to come primarily from the "new activism" and an adversarial news media, while the increase in government was said to be due to the Cold War defense budget and Great Society programs. To remedy this condition, "balance [needs] to be restored between governmental activity and governmental authority". The effects of this "excess of democracy" if not fixed are said to be an inability to maintain international trade, balanced budgets, and "hegemonic power" in the world.

== Reception ==
Critics observed that many members of the Trilateral Commission subsequently had roles in the Carter Administration and have been influenced by the report. Specifically, Zbigniew Brzezinski restated the conclusions of the report in an op-ed for the St. Petersburg Times. Noam Chomsky has often cited the report as an example of the type of hostility towards popular democracy and tactics for suppressing it that the "'liberal' wing of the state capitalist ruling elite" tend to favor, as opposed to the reactionary wing.

== See also ==
- Criticism of democracy
- Political Order in Changing Societies
- The Limits to Growth
- Powell Memorandum
- Trilateral Commission
