= William Schonfeld =

American political scientist and university administrator

William R. Schonfeld
- Occupations: Political scientist, author, researcher, educator and university administrator

Academic background
- Education: B.A. Cornell University and University Heights College of New York University, 1964; M.A. Princeton University, 1968; Ph.D. Princeton University, 1970
- Alma mater: Cornell University; New York University; Princeton University

Academic work
- Institutions: University of California, Irvine

William R. Schonfeld is an American political scientist, author, researcher, educator and university administrator. He holds the position of research professor of Political Science at the University of California, Irvine (UCI) and served as Dean of the School of Social Sciences from 1982 to 2002, making him the longest serving academic administrator in the history of the campus.

Schonfeld is known for his research on the connection between attitudes and actual behavior. He has published journal articles and is the author of the books Youth and Authority in France: A Study of Secondary Schools, Obedience and Revolt: French Behavior toward Authority, and Ethnographie du PS et du RPR: Les Éléphants et l'Aveugle. His contributions resulted in various awards including the Outstanding Teaching Effectiveness Award, Distinguished Faculty Lectureship Award for Teaching, Lauds & Laurels Extraordinarius Award, and the Distinguished University Service Award all at UCI.

== Education ==
Schonfeld began his undergraduate education at Cornell University and earned his B.A. from the University Heights College of New York University. The following year, 1964–65, he studied in France having been awarded a Fulbright Fellowship. He completed his M.A. at Princeton University in 1968, and his PhD in 1970. Concurrently, he held the role of Assistant in Research at the Center of International Studies from 1966 to 1969 and continued there as a Research Associate until 1970.

== Career ==
Schonfeld started his academic career in 1970 as a Visiting Lecturer at Princeton. Subsequently, he became an assistant professor of Political Science at UCI, a position he held from 1970 to 1975. He was promoted to associate professor of Political Science at UCI in 1975. Since 1981, he has been a professor at UCI.

From 1982 to 2002, he served as Dean of the School of Social Sciences at UCI, overseeing the establishment of new departments and earning the highest honor, the Lauds & Laurels extraordinarius Award, from the UCI Alumni Association. He later directed the Center for the Study of Democracy (a University of California Organized Research Unit from 2004 to 2007).

Schonfeld also worked as a political commentator with various media outlets, including France Inter, TF1, France Culture, Radio Tour Eiffel, and Radio Gilda, and contributed to the Canadian Broadcasting System in French. In 1976, he held a two-year appointment as a researcher at the Centre de Sociologie des Organisations in Paris.

== Research ==
Schonfeld has focused his research on authority, democratic theory, and comparative politics. He has worked on understanding the relationship between what people do and what they say, combining an observational ethnographic approach with attitudinal surveys and interviews. He has studied political socialization, political participation as well as political parties with a primary geographical focus on France. He directed research efforts toward a comparative organizational sociology of party elites. His examination of politics as a primary authority relationship has extended to governance in various settings. Contributing to party behavior theories, his work included analyses of elites within the French Gaullist and Socialist parties.

Schonfeld's research on the influence and stability of political party leadership challenged Robert Michels' established views on leadership and personnel changes in political parties. He argued that these views were inadequate and incomplete for modern mass parties. His empirical analysis contradicted the idea that sets of political party leaders tend to stay in office for extended periods of time, thus challenging Michels' iron law of oligarchy. His analysis revealed stability in leadership within the new Socialist Party and greater mobility among leaders in the Gaullist movement. In addition, through a comparative empirical examination of leadership tenure in the French Communist, Socialist, and Gaullist parties, he discovered that leadership stability varies between parties with oligarchic and those with monocratic governance forms.

Schonfeld has contributed to the field of political socialization by exploring the behaviors relevant to politics which children learn. Furthermore, he has reviewed and revised the understanding of political parties and their role in training governmental leaders. He delved into the concept of "participation" in political science, critically examining conflicts among scholars and a fundamental disagreement over the assumption of "asymmetry" as a ubiquitous aspect of organizational life.

== Works ==
In 1969, Schonfeld wrote Toward Understanding the Bases of Democratic Political Instability, a work that analyzed the evolving dynamics of authority in French secondary schools. The analysis brought to light the early stages of student submissiveness and insubordination, leading to a subsequent phase in which students adhere to precise conduct with fewer directives. Building on this research, he later authored Youth and Authority in France: A Study of Secondary Schools in 1971. J.P. Richert hailed this work as a "potentially significant contribution to the literature addressing political development in France".

Schonfeld's book, Obedience and Revolt: French Behavior toward Authority part of the Sage Publishing Library of Social Research series, investigated social psychological factors contributing to France's behavior towards the state. He studied in depth behavior toward authority in secondary schools and the Ecole Nationale d’Administration. James D. Wright, in his review for the American Journal of Sociology, positioned the book within the political socialization tradition and emphasized its extensive model of authority relationships within the context of how French students relate to their teachers. Jean Laponce in the Canadian Review of Political Science stated, "The book is clearly written, it is perceptive, and it blends well the descriptive and the theoretical, it is a much-welcomed addition to the study of French political culture: a welcome addition also to the general literature on the making and unmaking of hierarchies."

In 1985, Schonfeld published Ethnographie du PS et du RPR: Les Éléphants et l'Aveugle, which explored the dynamics and interactions within the leaderships of the two major French political parties Parti Socialiste (P.S.) and Rassemblement pour la République (R.P.R. the Gaullist party). Laurent Joffrin highlighted the book's "detailed analysis of the decision-making mechanisms" in the two parties and Charles Debbasch discussed the "unique quality of the work" describing it as "the best study ever done on the internal life of the Socialist Party and the Gaullist Movement." Kay Lawson praised the author and book saying "William Schonfeld is a courageous and original scholar…(H)is daring approach to these two mammoths of French party politics has significantly advanced our understanding of them both."

== Awards and honors ==
- 1964 – Phi Beta Kappa, New York University
- 1964-65 – Fulbright Fellowship (France), Fulbright Program
- 1973-74 – Fulbright Senior Lectureship (France), Fulbright Program
- 1984 – Professor of the Year Finalist, Council for Advancement and Support of Education
- 1998 – Distinguished Faculty Lectureship Award for Teaching, University of California, Irvine
- 2002 – Daniel G Aldrich Jr. Distinguished University Service Award, University of California, Irvine
- 2002 – Lauds & Laurels Extraordinarius Award, University of California, Irvine

== Bibliography ==
=== Books ===
- Youth and authority in France: A Study of Secondary Schools (1971) ISBN 978-0803901520
- Obedience and Revolt: French Behavior Toward Authority (1976) ISBN 978-0803905153
- Ethnographie du PS et du RPR: Les Éléphants et l'Aveugle (1999) ISBN 978-2717808490

=== Selected articles ===
- Schonfeld, W.R. (1971). The focus of political socialization research: an evaluation. World Politics, 23(3), 544–578.
- Schonfeld, W.R. (1975). The meaning of democratic participation. World Politics, 28(1), 134–158.
- Schonfeld, W.R. (1980). La stabilité des dirigeants des partis politiques: le personnel des directions nationales du Parti socialiste et du mouvement gaulliste. Revue française de science politique, 30(3), 477–505.
- Schonfeld, W.R. (1980). La stabilité des dirigeants des partis politiques: la théorie de l'oligarchie de Robert Michels. Revue française de science politique, 30(4), 846–866.
- Schonfeld, W.R. (1983). Political parties: The functional approach and the structural alternative. Comparative Politics, 15(4), 477–499.
