= The Soldier and the State =

1957 book by Samuel Huntington

The Soldier and the State: The Theory and Politics of Civil-Military Relations
- First edition
- Author: Samuel P. Huntington
- Language: English
- Subject: Civil-Military Relations
- Publisher: Belknap Press
- Publication date: 1957
- Publication place: United States
- Pages: 534
- ISBN: 0-674-81736-2
- OCLC: 45093643

The Soldier and the State: The Theory and Politics of Civil-Military Relations is a 1957 book written by political scientist Samuel P. Huntington. In the book, Huntington advances the theory of objective civilian control, according to which the optimal means of asserting control over the armed forces is to professionalize them. This is in contrast to subjective control, which involves placing legal and institutional restrictions on the military's autonomy. Edward M. Coffman has written that "[a]nyone seriously interested in American military history has to come to terms with Samuel P. Huntington's The Soldier and the State.

== Outline ==
=== Part I: "Military Institutions and the State: Theoretical and Historical Perspectives" ===
In the first chapter titled "Officership as a Profession", Huntington immediately states his thesis of the book. The purpose is to describe how the "modern officer corps is a professional body and the modern officer a professional man." Additionally, "Officership as a Profession", Huntington defines qualities of a profession and argues that the officer corps conforms to this definition. The qualities of a profession are (1) Expertise, (2) Responsibility, and (3) Corporateness. Specifically, the officer corps display specialized knowledge in the management of violence, maintains a monopoly on education and advancement in their field, and have an overarching responsibility to the society they serve and thus do not 'compete' in the open market. The military profession requires comprehensive study and training, and thus expertise, of an intellectual set of skills: organizing of forces, planning of activities, and executing and directing activities. The military expertise, the management of violence, includes the science of war and combat as well as organizational and administrative skills. The specializations of the military profession expands far and wide since there are engineers, pilots, mechanics, ordnance experts, and more.

Huntington argues this 'professional ethic' differentiates 'officers' from amateur groups engaged in violence (reservists, mercenaries, technical specialists, etc.). Huntington stresses that 'professionalism' entails a mutually binding relationship between society and its 'professionals.' The military profession requires that military officers fulfill its duties to its country by compliance with political officials running the state and government. It is the responsibility of the military to provide the public good of common defense since it acts as an agent to the principal government and citizenry. However, each step up in the hierarchy within the military profession demands more responsibility and skill because they are authorized to make more strategic decisions. In the case of the officer corps, officers are entrusted with evaluating the security of the state and providing expert advice to its leaders, and society in turn must afford a measure of deference to their professional expertise and institutions. (Huntington highlights the fact that the President cannot usurp the military hierarchy and appoint a lieutenant to serve on the Joint Chiefs of Staff). Additionally Huntington argues the officership displays a decidedly 'corporate character' as the officers tend to: live apart from general society, delineate hierarchy by specific uniforms and insignia, and maintain a strict separation (within the Department of Defense) from lay people who merely 'administer violence' (reservists). Corporateness refers to the distinct and unique features specific to a profession that which separate it from other professions. Entrance to the profession is restricted with high standards and fulfillment, military academia, and ranks.

Chapter two outlines the "rise of the military profession in Western society." He describes that the officer corps consisted of mercenaries from the breakdown of feudalism until their replacement by aristocratic officers after the Thirty Years' War (1618–1648) and why neither the mercenaries nor aristocrats were professionals under his definition. Finally in the 19th century the idea of the aristocratic military genius was replaced by the Prussian reliance upon "average men succeeding by superior education, organization and experience."

Chapter three discusses the military mind and military professional ethic. He notes misconceptions regarding the military mind and seeks "to elaborate the professional military ethic with respect to (1) basic values and perspectives, (2) national military policy, (3) the relation of the military to the state." He summarizes the ethic as "conservative realism....It exalts obedience as the highest virtue of military men. The military ethic is thus pessimistic, collectivist, historically inclined, power-oriented, nationalistic, militaristic, pacifist, and instrumentalist in its view of the military profession."

Chapter four is a discussion of civil-military relations in theory. He defines subjective civilian control (where military professionalism is reduced due to co-opting of the military by civilian political groups) and objective civilian control - where military professional thrives as it is far removed from politics. He describes the effect of four ideologies (liberalism, fascism, Marxism, conservatism) on military professionalism and civilian control.

Chapter five analyzes the military professional in the German and Japanese societies where it became dominant as militarism. He states that, "no country has had a wider variety of experiences in civil-military relations than modern Germany", with its officer corps achieving unmatched "high standards of professionalism" and then being "completely prostituted" under Nazism. He details the varying situations of the imperial, World War I, republican, and Nazi periods. In contrast, "Japanese civil-military relations remained in a single relatively stable pattern from 1868 to 1945" where the "military played a persistently active role in the politics of their country." He argues that "in both countries the disruption of the civil-military balance reflected more basic constitutional disorders" and "that disruption helped undermine the nation's security: distorting the perspective and judgment of soldiers and statesmen."

=== Part II: "Military Power in America: The Historical Experience: 1789–1940" ===
Chapter six describes the military in the traditional liberal American political context in four sections: liberalism and the Constitution as historical constants of American civil-military relations, the prevalence of liberalism in the U.S., the liberal approach to military affairs, and the military hero in liberal politics. He details how "the American liberal approach to military affairs was hostile, static and dominant; the conservative approach of the Federalists and the South sympathetic, constructive and thwarted." The elements of American liberalism which influenced international relations "were (1) its indifference to international affairs, (2) its application of domestic solutions to international affairs, and (3) its search for objectivity in international affairs." He also states that "the United States, by virtue of its noninvolvement in the balance of power was able to pursue foreign policy objectives defined in terms of universal ideals rather than in terms of national interests." He discusses the "hostile image of the military profession" and "liberal military policy". He argues that the non-professional military hero was traditionally welcomed in liberal America while the professional military hero was generally not successful politically.

Chapter seven explains the structure of civil-military relations provided by the conservative U.S. constitution and civil control of the military.

Chapter eight outlines the American military tradition up to the Civil War.

Chapter nine is "The Creation of the American Military Profession". It outlines the contributions of key individuals and institutions and describes the origins of the American military mind.

Chapter ten covers the period 1890 to 1920, including "Neo-Hamiltonism", Alfred Mahan and Leonard Wood.

Chapter eleven covers interwar civil-military relations and the military ethic of the period.

=== Part III: "The Crisis of American Civil-Military Relations 1940–1955" ===
Chapter twelve covers World War II.

Chapter thirteen outlines civil-military relations in the first decade after World War II.

Chapter fourteen is "The Political Roles of the Joint Chiefs."

Chapter fifteen describes the impact of the separation of powers on civil-military relations during the Cold War.

Chapter sixteen analyzes the Cold War structure of the Defense Department in the context of civil-military relations.

Chapter seventeen discusses the challenges faced by the heightened ongoing defense needs of the Cold War versus the tradition of American liberalism and the move "Towards a New Equilibrium" between the two.
