= Michel Crozier =

French sociologist (1922–2013)

- Born: 1922; Sainte-Menehould, France
- Died: 2013 (aged 90–91); Paris, France
- Awards: Tocqueville Price

Academic background
- Education: HEC Paris

Academic work
- Main interests: Sociology of organizations
- Notable works: The Bureaucratic Phenomenon Actors and Systems
- Influenced: Erhard Friedberg, Christine Musselin, Renaud Sainsaulieu, Mario d'Angelo, François Dupuy

Michel Crozier (6 November 1922 in Sainte-Menehould, Marne – 24 May 2013 in Paris) was a French sociologist and member of the Académie des sciences morales et politiques from 1999 until his death. He also was a fellow of the American Academy of Arts and Sciences, a member of the American Philosophical Society, and a laureate of the Prix Alexis de Tocqueville (1997).

== Biography ==
Crozier became a sociologist not rather than by training but because of a seminal experience in social analysis that was made possible by an American scholarship that he used to study the labor movement in the United States. After his initial training in business (HEC Paris, 1943) and law, he spent 14 months traveling across the US in the immediate years after World War II, interviewing labor union members and officials, and getting to know the American labor movement and American society in general. Back in France, he published a book on that research and joined the French National Center for Scientific Research as a sociologist.

In 1953, he carried out his first research on the white-collar workers in the French Postal Bank. The publication of the results of this research (Petits Fonctionnaires au travail) established his reputation as a sociologist of white-collar work and set off a series of new field studies on insurance companies; a large nationalized bank; and, last but not least, on the French tobacco monopoly. In 1959, he was invited to the Center for Advanced Study in the Behavioral Sciences at Palo Alto. There, he started preparing and drafting what would eventually become The Bureaucratic Phenomenon, published first in English in 1964 and then in French. In that book, which established the sociology of organizations as a discipline in France, he sketched out the bases of what would later on become the "strategic analysis of organizations."

The international success of The Bureaucratic Phenomenon provided him with the reputation and the resources to found the Center for the Sociology of Organizations (CSO), a small research group of young sociologists, with whom he embarked on a new research program on French Administration and Change, and pursued the theoretical and methodological elaboration of his approach to the study of organizations. In 1977, together with Erhard Friedberg, he published L’Acteur et le système (Actors and Systems, 1981, Chicago University Press), a scientific essay that was highly influential in France and the rest of Continental Europe. In it, the authors put forth an approach to the study of organizations and other less formalized systems of action and detailed the theoretical and methodological assumptions that lie behind it. They conceptualize that organizations and systems function in a way that originates from game structures that channel and stabilize power and bargains relations between a set of strategically interdependent actors.

Crozier never considered sociology and sociological theorizing as an end in itself. He never separated his sociological work from his commitment to administrative and social reform, in the service of which he published seven books and engaged in numerous consultancies and interventions. He published his autobiography in two volumes, Ma Belle Epoque (2002), and A Contre-Courant (2004).

== Honours ==
- Officer of the Legion of Honour
- Commander of the Ordre national du Mérite

== Selected bibliography ==
Crozier was the author of over 20 books and 80 articles, mostly written in French. This is a selection of some of his works:

=== Books ===
- Crozier, Michel (2010) The Bureaucratic Phenomenon (with a new introduction by Erhard Friedberg) (New Brunswick and London: Transactions Publishers, 2010). (Originally published: Chicago: University of Chicago Press, 1964)
- Crozier, Michel. L'entreprise à l'écoute : apprendre le management post-industriel (translated in Italian and Spanish) (Paris: Interéditions, 1987).
- Crozier, Michel. The Trouble with America: Why the Social System Is Breaking Down (Berkeley, CA: University of California Press, 1984).
- Crozier, Michel. Strategies for Change (Cambridge, MA: MIT Press, 1982).
- Crozier, Michel & Friedberg, Erhard. Actors and Systems (Chicago: University of Chicago Press, 1980).
- Michel Crozier, Samuel P. Huntington, and Joji Watanuki, The Crisis of Democracy: On the Governability of Democracies, New York University Press, 1975.
- Crozier, Michel. The World of the Office-Worker. (Chicago: University of Chicago Press, 1965).

=== Articles ===
- 'Organization and Collective Action. Our Contribution to Organizational Analysis (with Erhard Friedberg) in S.B. Bacharach, P., Gagliardi & P. Mundell (Eds). Research in the Sociology of Organizations. Vol. XIII, Special Issue on European Perspectives of Organizational Theory, Greenwich, CT: JAI Press, 1995) Greenwich, CT: Traduction italienne :Il Pensiero Organizzativo Europeo, Edizioni angelo Guerini e Associati, 1997.
- "The Boundaries of Business: the Changing Organization" in Harvard Business Review, July 1991, pp. 138–140.
- "The relational Boundaries of Rationality" in: K.R. Monroe (Ed.), The Economic Approach to Politics: A Critical Reassessment of the Theory of Rational Action (New York, HarperCollins, 1991), pp. 306–316.
- "Organizations as Means and Constraints of Collective Action," in: Warner, M. (éd.). Organizational Choice and Constraint (London: Publishers of Grower Press, Saxon House, 1977).

== See also ==
- Center for the Sociology of Organizations
