= Preclusive purchasing =

Preclusive purchasing shifts the demand curve (D1 becomes D2), thus increasing price of the good for other potential purchasers, such as other belligerents.

Preclusive purchasing, also called preclusive buying or preemptive buying, is an economic warfare tactic in which a belligerent in a conflict purchases matériel and operations from neutral countries not for domestic needs but to deprive their use for other belligerents. The tactic was proposed by France during World War I but never implemented.

Preclusive purchasing drives up the price by shifting the demand curve.

Preclusive purchasing was used by the British during World War II to deny Nazi Germany access to wolframite from Spain. Similarly, the British and the Americans bought chromite ore from Turkey to reduce its ability to supply the mineral to Germany. A deal required the British and the Americans to buy Turkish dried fruit and tobacco as well.

In the period prior to the attack on Pearl Harbor while the United States was officially neutral, the United States began preclusively purchasing Chilean copper and Brazilian manganese, rubber, industrial diamonds, quartz crystal, and mica.
