= Who Are We? The Challenges to America's National Identity =

2004 book by Samuel P. Huntington

- Author: Samuel P. Huntington
- Language: English
- Subject: National identity
- Publisher: Simon & Schuster
- Publication date: 2004
- Publication place: United States
- Pages: 448
- ISBN: 0-684-87053-3
- OCLC: 54400099

Who Are We? The Challenges to America's National Identity (2004) is a treatise by political scientist and historian Samuel P. Huntington (1927–2008). The book attempts to understand the nature of American identity and the challenges it will face in the future.

== Describing American identity ==
In describing the American identity, Huntington first contests the notion that the country is, as often repeated, "a nation of immigrants". He writes that America's founders were not immigrants, but settlers, since British settlers came to North America to establish a new society, as opposed to migrating from one existing society to another one as immigrants do. Later peoples who joined the culture present in the original British colonies, already established by these settlers, were indeed immigrants.

Many people point to the American Creed as the core of American identity. Huntington defines the American Creed as embodying the "principles of liberty, equality, individualism, representative government, and private property". Yet Huntington asks:

Would America be the America it is today if in the 17th and 18th centuries it had been settled not by British Protestants but by French, Spanish, or Portuguese Catholics? The answer is no. It would not be America; it would be Quebec, Mexico, or Brazil.

Huntington argues that, of all the nations in Europe, and of all the colonies, America alone developed the American Creed, and that this simple observation requires explanation. This observation leads to two conclusions: that America was an English colony, and that America alone was formed as a result of the Reformation.

To advance his argument about the contribution to America of its English heritage, he says:

The political and legal institutions the settlers created in the seventeenth and eighteenth centuries embodied in large part the institutions and practices of England's late-sixteenth-century and early-seventeenth-century "Tudor constitution." These included: the concept of a fundamental law superior to and limiting government; the fusion of executive, legislative, and judicial functions and the division of power among separate institutions and governments; the relative power of the legislature and chief executive; the merger of the "dignified" and "efficient" functions in the chief executive; a two-house legislature; the responsibility of the legislature to their local constituencies; a legislative committee system; and primary reliance for defense on militia rather than a standing army.

As for the importance of Protestantism, Huntington states: "The American Creed is the unique creation of a dissenting Protestant culture". In particular, he highlights the:

Protestant emphasis on the individual conscience and the responsibility of individuals to learn God's truths directly from the Bible promoted American commitment to individualism, equality, and the rights to freedom of religion and opinion. Protestantism stressed the work ethic and the responsibility of the individual for his own success or failure in life...With its congregational forms of church organization, Protestantism fostered opposition to hierarchy and the assumption that similar democratic forms should be employed in government.

== Challenges to American identity ==
Huntington argues that it is during the 1960s that American identity begins to erode. This was the result of several factors:

- The beginning of economic globalization and the rise of global subnational identities
- The easing of the Cold War and its end in 1989 reduced the importance of national identity
- Attempts by candidates for political offices to win over groups of voters
- The desire of subnational group leaders to enhance the status of their respective groups and their personal status within them
- The interpretation of Congressional acts that led to their execution in expedient ways, but not necessarily in the ways the framers intended
- The passing on of feelings of sympathy and guilt for past actions as encouraged by academic elites and intellectuals
- The changes in views of race and ethnicity as promoted by civil rights and immigration laws

Huntington places the passage and subsequent misinterpretation of the Civil Rights Act of 1964 and the Voting Rights Act of 1965 at the center of government actions that eroded the American Creed. Huntington writes:

Senator Hubert Humphrey, the floor manager of the bill, assured the Senate that nothing in the bill gave courts or executive agencies the power "to require hiring, firing, or promotion of employees in order to meet a racial 'quota' or to achieve a certain balance...Title VII prohibits discrimination...[and] is designed to encourage hiring on the basis of ability and qualifications, not race or religion.

Yet these acts gave rise to a system of quotas and affirmative action, so that "the Court derived from Title VII a legal requirement that the proponents of the law had expressly disclaimed".

Another component of American identity that Huntington sees as under attack is the use of English. Up until the late 20th century, English has been the dominant language of America and was actively taught to immigrants. This was not only because Americans throughout history had spoken this language, but also because, with a variety of languages brought by different immigrant groups to the United States, teaching everyone to learn to speak and write English ensured communication among these groups. This tradition was inadvertently undermined by Title VI of the Civil Rights Act, which prohibited discrimination on the basis of "national origin". The act was interpreted to mean that potential voters who did not speak English were entitled to assistance under this "national origin" clause so that they would not be disadvantaged. This led to bilingual voting ballots and the beginning of bilingual education. In 1974, the Civil Rights Act "was amended to require schools to provide instruction in a student's native language and culture 'to the extent necessary to allow the child to progress effectively through the education system.'" However, Huntington states that the result was, as stated by 1985 Secretary of Education William Bennett, that the program became:

a way of enhancing students' knowledge of their native language and culture. Bilingual education was no longer seen so much as a means to ensure that students learned English, or as a transitional method until students learned English. Rather, it became an emblem of cultural pride, a means of producing a positive self-image in the student.

Finally, the single most imposing challenge to America, in Huntington's view, is the problem of Mexican immigration and the resulting "Hispanization" of those regions of the United States adjacent to and acquired from Mexico. He fears that the result of Mexican immigration could be a "bifurcated" America. Huntington argues that Mexican immigration differs from previous waves of immigration in several fundamental ways, including:

- Contiguity: America is the only First World country in the world sharing a long, undefended border with a Third World country, making the crossing both easy and appealing to Mexicans.
- Numbers: In the 1990s, Mexican immigration accounted for 25% of all legal immigration, much larger than the influx of Irish or German immigrants earlier in American history.
- Illegality: Roughly 8–10 million illegal immigrants were in the United States by 2003, 58% of which were Mexican.
- Regional concentration: "In 2000, nearly two thirds of Mexican immigrants lived in the West, and nearly half in California".
- Persistence: It is estimated that nearly half a million Mexicans will immigrate to the United States each year until 2030, culminating in nearly a half century of high immigration from a single country.
- Historical presence: "No other immigrant group in American history has asserted or has been able to assert a historical claim to American territory. Mexicans and Mexican-Americans can and do make that claim".

Not only does Mexican immigration differ from previous immigration in these ways, but Huntington argues that Mexicans lag other immigrants in their assimilation into American society for several reasons, including:

- Language: Different from other immigrants, Hispanic immigrants emphasize the need for their children to be fluent in Spanish.
- Education: Mexicans were less likely to graduate high school and attend college than other immigrant groups.
- Occupation and income: Mexican immigrants were far less likely to hold professional or managerial positions, and had low rates of self-employment and entrepreneurship. This parallels their educational attainment. Mexican immigrants were also more likely to live in poverty and to be on welfare than any other ethnic group, except Dominicans.
- Citizenship: The rate of naturalization of Mexican immigrants was among the lowest of all immigrant groups. At least part of this may be attributable to the influence of illegal immigration.
- Intermarriage: Rates of Hispanic intermarriage are roughly equivalent to that of other immigrant groups.
- Identity: Mexican immigrants and their children generally refer to themselves as Mexican first and American second. However, approximately one quarter of Hispanics convert to Protestantism, a fact that Huntington attributes to assimilation of American culture, as many Hispanics come from a Catholic tradition.

Huntington argues that these differences are the result of cultural differences between American Anglo Protestant culture and Hispanic "culture of Catholicism". Lionel Sosa, a Texas Mexican-American businessman, summarizes these differences as "mistrust of people outside the family; lack of initiative, self-reliance, and ambition; low priority for education; acceptance of poverty as a virtue necessary for entrance into heaven".

Huntington argues that this persistent pattern of a massive influx of immigrants from Latin America, especially Mexico, has already resulted in changes in culture, business, language, and education in the Southwestern United States. If the trend continues, this could result in the consolidation of this part of the country into a distinct cultural bloc within the United States that threatens to bifurcate America.

Finally, Huntington lists other ways in which America's identity has weakened. These include: the collapse of the Soviet Union left the United States without an enemy against which to define itself; the denationalization of business, professional, intellectual, and academic elites; and the influence of diasporas. By "denationalization", Huntington means that these Americans think of themselves mostly as members of an international community and not really as citizens of the United States.

== Renewing American identity ==
After laying out the concerns for the weakening and subsequent dissolution of America, which could plausibly occur due to cultural bifurcation and/or a government formed of denationalized elites that increasingly ignore the will of the public, Huntington attempts to formulate a solution to these problems. He argues that adherence to the American Creed is by itself not enough to sustain an American identity. An example of a state that attempted to use ideology alone was the Soviet Union, which attempted to impose communism on different cultures and nationalities, and eventually collapsed. A similar fate could lie in store for the United States unless Americans "participate in American life, learn America's language [English], history, and customs, absorb America's Anglo-Protestant culture, and identify primarily with America rather than with their country of birth". In particular, Huntington suggests that Americans turn to Protestantism, and recognize that what distinguishes America from other countries is that it is an extremely religious Western country, founded on the principles of the Enlightenment and Protestant Reformation.

== Reception ==
On the year of the book's release, Alan Wolfe of Foreign Affairs wrote, "to claim that there exists a common 'Anglo-Protestant culture...' ignores the fact that Protestants have disagreed vehemently with each other over what that culture is." He furthermore argued that "Huntington fails to appreciate the degree to which immigrants shaped American culture even as they assimilated" and that the liberal elites he criticizes "include disproportionately large numbers of the Anglo-Protestants whose culture Huntington wants to celebrate." Michiko Kakutani of the New York Times further criticized it as "recycling arguments made by a wide array of earlier thinkers... while glossing masses of research with decidedly subjective analysis" and as "riddled with gross generalizations... and equally questionable assertions"

As the 2013 Washington Post article by Dylan Matthews challenged Huntington's points, arguing that Latino immigrants have been adapting to English just as quickly as Asian and European immigrants have as of 2000, that proficiency in English and support for English as the official language of the United States among Latino Americans increased over generational status, and that Hispanic Americans are no less religious or hard-working than white Americans are.

In 2017, Washington Post book critic Carlos Lozada penned an editorial describing Huntington's works as "[anticipating] America's political and intellectual battles -- and [pointing] to the country we may become." He states that Huntington "captures the dissonance between working classes and elites, between nationalism and cosmopolitanism, that played out in the 2016 campaign." He also comments that Huntington's views expressed in Clash of Civilizations and Who Are We? contrast sharply with those he expressed in his 1981 work American Politics: The Promise of Disharmony, wherein Huntington argues that Americans are primarily united by a classically liberal creed rather than "ethnic identity or religious faith." Lozada goes on to challenge criticism of Huntington's ideas as "single-minded," stating that "Huntington foresees an America roiled by self-doubt, white nationalism and enmity against Islam." However, he concedes that Huntington offers a "narrow view of American uniqueness," ultimately warning against isolationism, "demonizing newcomers and demanding cultural fealty."
