= Mario d'Angelo =

French academic, management consultant and author

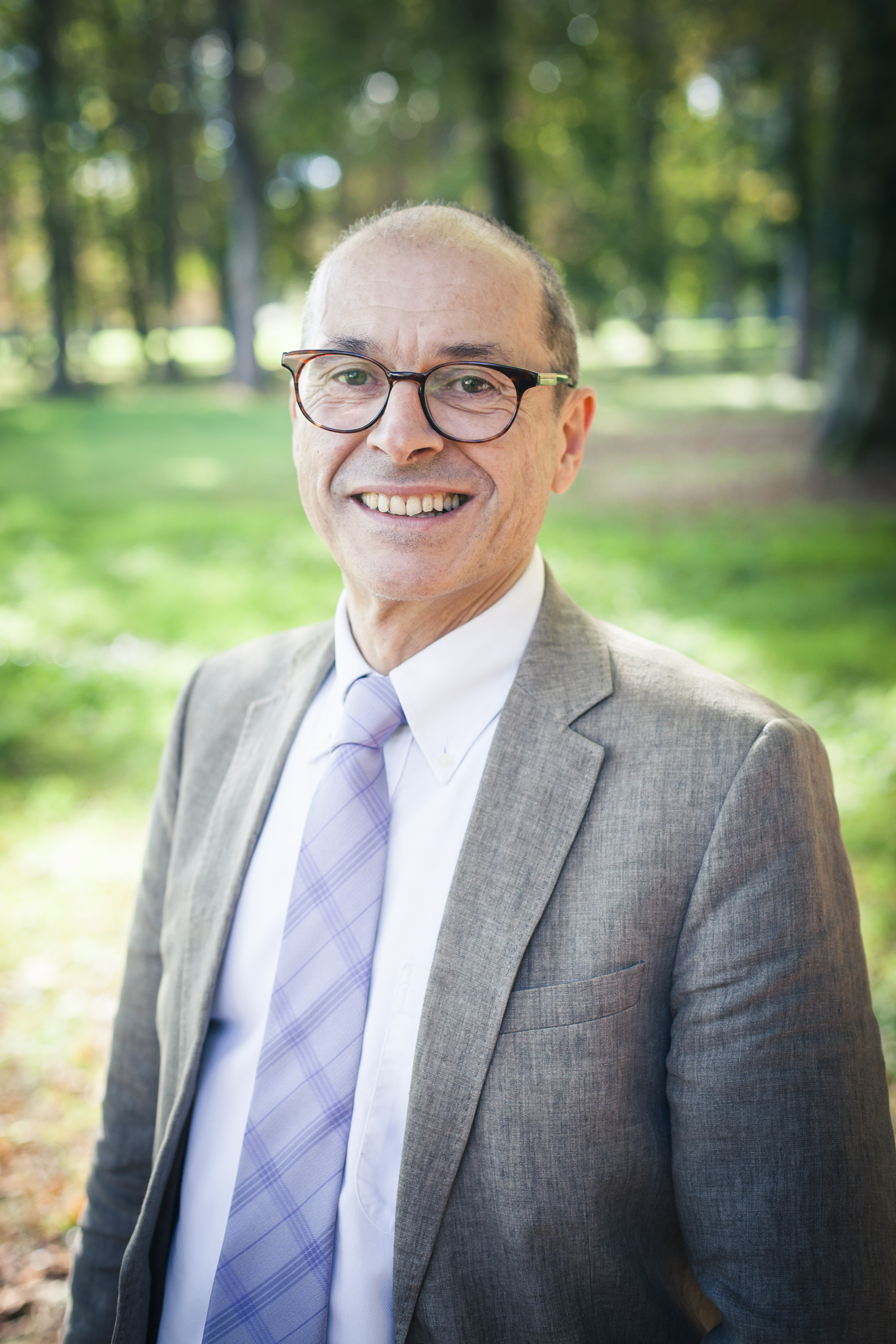
- Born: 1954 (age 71–72)

Academic background
- Education: Sciences Po Paris
- Influences: Michel Crozier

Academic work
- Main interests: Management and interdisciplinarity
- Notable works: Cultural field in Europe

Notes
- Awarded the French Habilitation à diriger des recherches

Mario d’Angelo is a French academic, management consultant and author, born in 1954 with Italian and German ancestry. His work in the field of culture and the creative industries is in line with the system analysis and interdisciplinarity approach (public policies, cultural management, organisational sociology, economics and history). His empirical researches are focused on the European context.

His public writings have appeared in Les Échos, Le Monde Diplomatique, La Tribune, and other French newspapers.

== Publications ==
D'Angelo has extensively published in French, among which several books have been translated into English:

- Cultural Policies in Europe (4 volumes). Strasbourg: Council of Europe Publishing.
1. (with Paul Vesperini)A comparative approach ISBN 978-92-871-3391-5
2. (with P. Vesperini) Method and practice of evaluation ISBN 978-92-871-3759-3
3. (with P. Vesperini) Regions and decentralisation https://idee-europe.eu/en/auteur/dangelo-mario-en/
4. Local issues, ISBN 978-92-871-4326-6
- Regards croisés sur l'Occident (with Djamchid Assadi), Eurorient no 31, 2011, L'Harmattan, (ISBN 978-2-296-54307-2)
- La Musique à la Belle Époque, Paris, Éditions Le Manuscrit, 2013, (ISBN 978-2-304-04152-1)
- Acteurs culturels: positions et stratégies dans le champ de la culture et des industries créatives. Une étude dans vingt pays d'Europe, Paris, Idée Europe (coll. Innovations & Développement), 2018, (ISBN 2-909941-13-2)
- Qui sont les acteurs culturels? Une typologie des situations stratégiques dans le champ culturel et créatif, Paris, Éditions Le Manuscrit, 2025, ISBN 978-23-040-5646-4
