= Lawrence Harrison (academic) =

American academic (1932-2015)

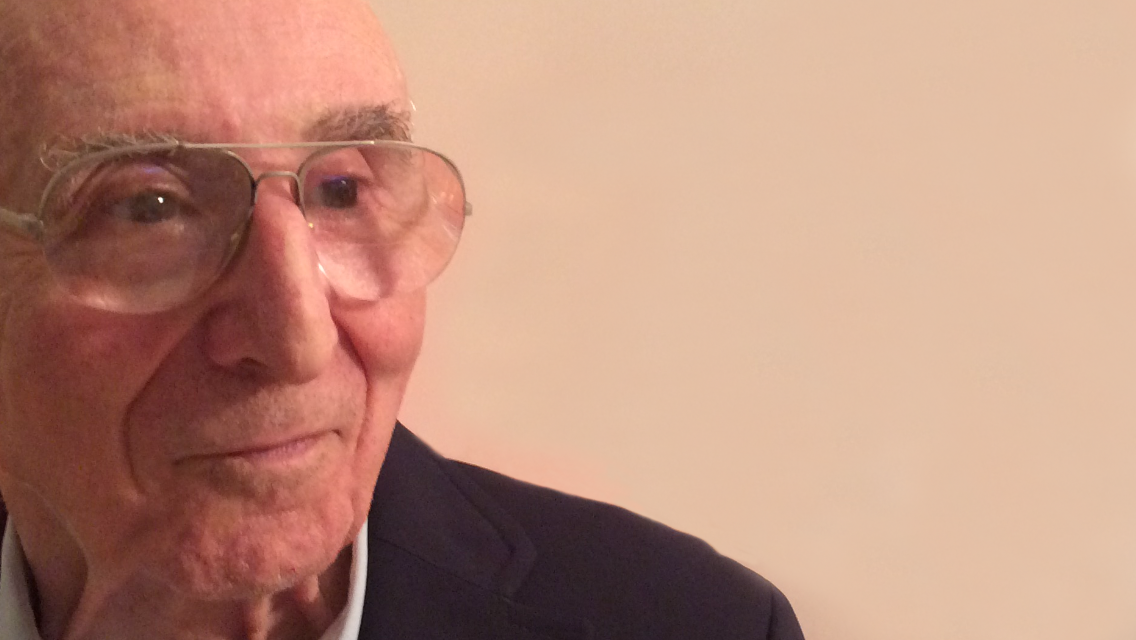
Lawrence Harrison

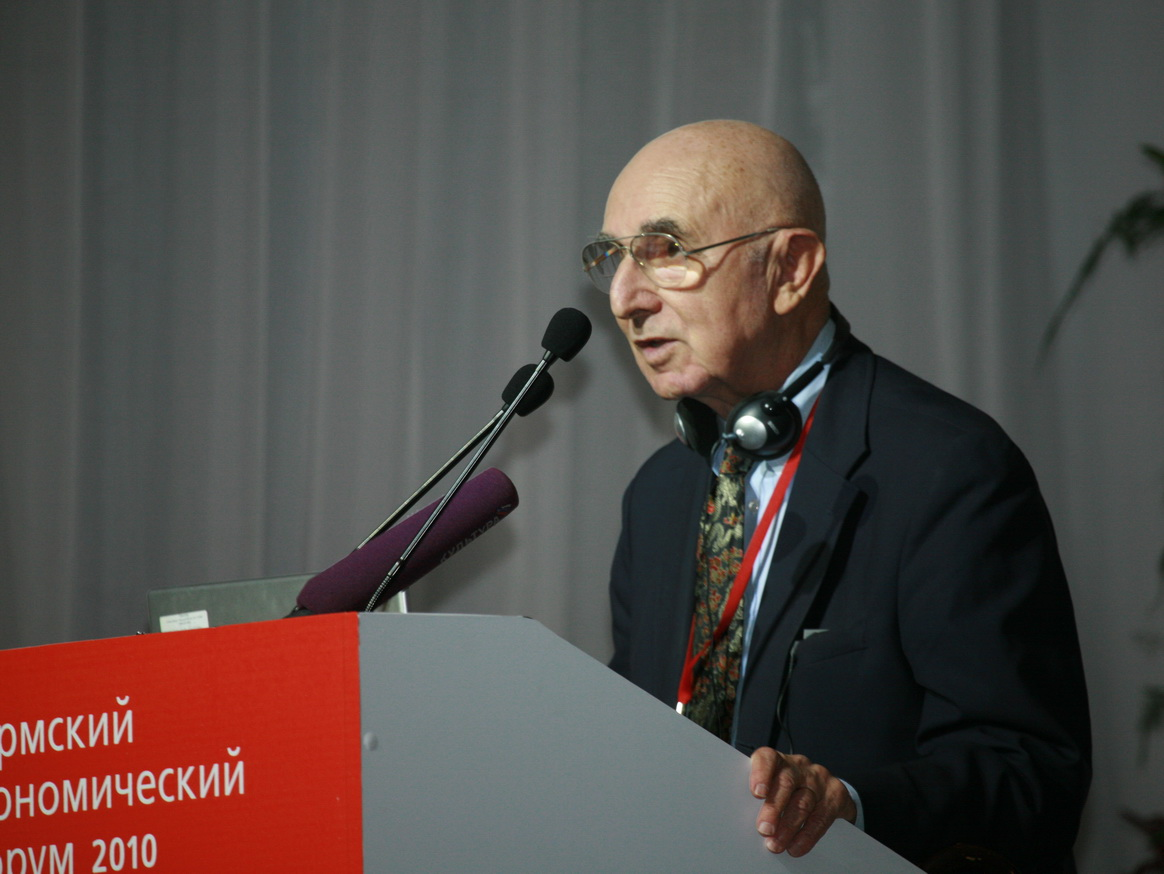

Lawrence E. Harrison (March 11, 1932 - December 9, 2015) was an American scholar known for his work on international development and being former USAID mission director to various Latin American countries. He is the past director of the Cultural Change Institute at the Fletcher School, Tufts University, where he also served as an adjunct lecturer. He is the author of various books and articles, most notably his work with Samuel P. Huntington, Culture Matters.

His work was cited thousands of times in books, journals, and other academic works. He was also noted as an influence on USAID's policies. His views created considerable disputes with some, such as Professor Noam Chomsky.

He died December 9, 2015, at the University Hospital of Alexandroupolis, Greece.

== Ideas ==
Harrison's main thesis is that culture is the dominant factor affecting progress and development of groups and nations. While economic, historical, and geographical factors are relevant, Harrison suggests what ultimately determines whether a given group will enjoy economic prosperity in a free society is its cultural values. Religious beliefs and other systems of values will greatly affect the development of a given nation, which explains, in his view, the lasting underdevelopment of nations like Haiti.

== Selected bibliography ==
- Jews, Confucians, and Protestants: Cultural Capital, and the End of Multiculturalism (2012)
- The Central Liberal Truth: How Politics Can Change a Culture and Save It from Itself (2006)
- Developing Cultures: Essays On Cultural Change (co-editor with Jerome Kagan) (2006)
- Culture Matters--How Values Shape Human Progress (co-editor with Samuel P. Huntington) (2000)
- The Pan-American Dream (1997)
- Who Prospers? How Cultural Values Shape Economic and Political Success (1992)
- Underdevelopment is a State of Mind--The Latin American Case (1985)
