= Weinberger Doctrine =

1980s U.S. military doctrine

The Weinberger Doctrine was a list of points governing when the United States could commit troops in military engagements. The doctrine was publicly disclosed by U.S. Secretary of Defense Caspar Weinberger on November 28, 1984, in a speech entitled "The Uses of Military Power" delivered before the National Press Club in Washington, D.C.

The Weinberger Doctrine was an outgrowth of the collective lessons learned from the Vietnam War and the desire of the U.S. government to avoid such quagmires in the future.

== Doctrine ==
The Weinberger Doctrine asserts that:

1. The United States should not commit forces to combat unless the vital national interests of the United States or its allies are involved.
2. U.S. troops should only be committed wholeheartedly and with the clear intention of winning. Otherwise, troops should not be committed.
3. U.S. combat troops should be committed only with clearly defined political and military objectives and with the capacity to accomplish those objectives.
4. The relationship between the objectives and the size and composition of the forces committed should be continually reassessed and adjusted if necessary.
5. U.S. troops should not be committed to battle without a "reasonable assurance" of the support of U.S. public opinion and Congress.
6. The commitment of U.S. troops should be considered only as a last resort.

== Political background ==
Two unconnected events led to Weinberger's speech. One was his wanting to respond to the 1983 Beirut barracks bombings, in which 241 U.S. marines, sailors, and soldiers were killed. U.S. forces were in Lebanon as part of an ill-fated U.S. peace enforcement mission undertaken despite the reportedly vigorous opposition of both Weinberger and the Joint Chiefs of Staff, who argued that its purpose was never clearly defined and that the chaotic and violent situation in Lebanon could not be brought under control by any outside force. They further argued that any U.S. military contingent entered into the Lebanon conflict would become a convenient and prominent target for the various factions in the civil war. The second event was the invasion of Grenada on October 25, 1983 in which U.S. and allied forces invaded Grenada after a pro-Soviet military coup ousted the constitutional government.

An older event but probably having a stronger influence on U.S. foreign policy, presidential powers, and the commitment of U.S. military forces and may have precipitated articulation of the Weinberger Doctrine was the legacy of the Vietnam War. Since 1975, when South Vietnam fell to communist forces, U.S. foreign policy had avoided the use of military force without any officially-stated policy for how to employ those powers.

== Opposition ==
Not everyone has agreed with these principles. Notably, at the time of the doctrine's publishing, U.S. Secretary of State George Shultz, "took strong public objection to them." He worried that without credible threats of military action, "American diplomacy... would be hamstrung by the military's supposed reluctance to become involved in 'limited' wars."

In his memoirs, An American Life, Ronald Reagan listed the principles, said that they helped guide his administration's foreign policy decisions, and recommended them to future presidents.

Historian and policy analyst Eliot A. Cohen finds the Weinberger tests to be unhelpful in formulating practical foreign policy.

== See also ==
- Bush Doctrine
- Powell Doctrine
