= Political Order in Changing Societies =

1968 book by Samuel Huntington

- First edition
- Author: Samuel P. Huntington
- Language: English
- Genre: Non-fiction
- Publisher: Yale University Press
- Publication date: 1968
- Publication place: United States

With his famous book Political Order in Changing Societies, published in 1968, the American political scientist and Harvard professor Samuel P. Huntington is considered to be one of the ”Founding Fathers” of neo-institutionalism, the historical institutionalism. The book is dealing with the role of political institutions in changing political systems. Huntington stated that ”the most important political distinction among countries concerns not their form of government but their degree of government”. As stated by Francis Fukuyama, Huntington argued that political decay was "at least as likely as political development", and that neither "economic nor social development" could proceed without political order, the actual experience of newly independent countries being "one of increasing social and political disorder".

For Huntington, ”the capacity to create political institutions is the capacity to create public interests”. Huntington argues that changes are caused by tensions within the political and social system, and criticizes modernization theory, contending that its argument for economic change and development being the prime factors responsible for the creation of stable, democratic political systems is flawed. Focusing on other factors like urbanization, increased literacy, social mobilization, and economic growth, he stresses that those factors are not significantly related to political development; in fact a major part of his argument is that those processes are related but distinct. For Huntington, ”political order depends in part on the relation between the development of political institutions and the mobilization of new social forces into politics”.

The existence (or lack) of order should not be confused with the issue of the type of that order, both on political level (democratic, authoritarian) and on economic level (socialist, free-market). While modernity equals stability, modernization is actually a cause for instability, due to urbanization, rising expectations due to literacy, education and the spread of media, etc. In order to explain the decline in political order throughout Asia, Africa, and Latin America in the late '50s and the early '60s, Huntington stated: ”What was responsible for this violence and instability? The primary thesis of this book is that it was in large part the product of rapid social change and the rapid mobilization of new groups into politics coupled with the slow development of political institutions”.

== Influences ==
Controversial on first release, and not only in the west, the book is favored by Chinese Neoconservatives. Its 1988 translation into Chinese influenced Chinese academic debate about democracy and the development of neo-authoritarians in China. Peter Moody, a professor emeritus of Political Science at the University of Notre Dame in Indiana, claims that the events of the 1989 Tiananmen Square protests and massacre seemed to confirm to them their belief in a strong state; while considering an autocratic model for China actually weak and ineffectual, they considered a strong state important for economic growth along the lines of Asian "tiger" economies. Moody further claims that "They continued to draw ideas from a distorted reading of Samuel Huntington and his Political Order in Changing Societies in particular; whatever his use as a foreigner who advocated limiting the scope of democracy, his ideas seemed to have merit on their own".

== Reviews ==
Writing in 1997, Francis Fukuyama believed that the book "shaped the understanding of a generation of students on the nature of party systems", though he considers the "characterization of the Soviet Union and other communist states as highly developed polities" odd in retrospect, since "their surface institutional calm masked a high degree of internal rot and illegitimacy".

Writing in 2011, Fukuyama considered that Political Order in Changing Societies "appeared against the backdrop (of) and frontally challenged" the assumptions of "the Americanized version of modernization theory", which included "the sunny view that all good things went together: Economic growth, social mobilization, political institutions, and cultural values", all "changing for the better in tandem". Fukuyama considers the book Huntington's "(most important) contribution to the study of politics", and "probably the last major attempt to write a general theory of political development", though its "significance needs to be placed in the context of the ideas that were dominant in the 1950s and early 1960s".
