= Forced draft urbanization =

Military strategy

Forced draft urbanization (sometimes called "forced draft modernization") was a policy elaborated by Samuel P. Huntington in a 1968 article "The Bases of Accommodation" published in the journal Foreign Affairs, which described a strategy of carpet-bombing and defoliating the rural lands and jungles of Vietnam, so that peasants there would be unable to support themselves and would be forced to move into the city, thus weakening the support base of the Viet Cong.

== See also ==
- Vietnam War
