= Center for the Sociology of Organizations =

French research laboratory

The Center for the Sociology of Organizations (CSO) (French: Centre de Sociologie des Organisations) is a research laboratory in social sciences located in Paris. At first the Center focused on topics related to the state and the French government; soon after, it expanded its range of research into public and private organizations, both French and international.

== Overview ==
The Center was founded in 1961 by Michel Crozier, who served as its director until 1993. In 2014 the director is Christine Musselin. The Center is staffed by senior researchers, research associates, and PhD students. The Center research focuses primarily on the structure and action of complex organizations, research often touches also on economic sociology and public sociology. There are five major research programs focusing on risk, higher education and scientific research, health, sustainable development, technology transfer, changes in them organization of government.

In 1976, the Center became a laboratory under the National Centre for Scientific Research (CNRS). Since 2001, it has been under the joint sponsorship of CNRS and Sciences Po. Since 2012, the Center is an integral part of the Interdisciplinary Laboratory evaluation of public policies (LIEPP) of Sciences Po, recognized as a LabEx (Laboratoire d' excellence - Laboratory of Excellence) funded under the Future Investments program.

In 2012, the Center was evaluated in 2012 by l'ARES, the French agency responsible for the evaluation of higher education and research institutions; the agency found that the number and quality of publications demonstrate very strong scientific activity among its members: 105 items in journals with peer listed by AERES or in international databases, including nearly 40% in English; 17 scientific papers, 130 book chapters, and 16 principals works.
