= Samuel P. Huntington =

American political scientist (1927–2008)

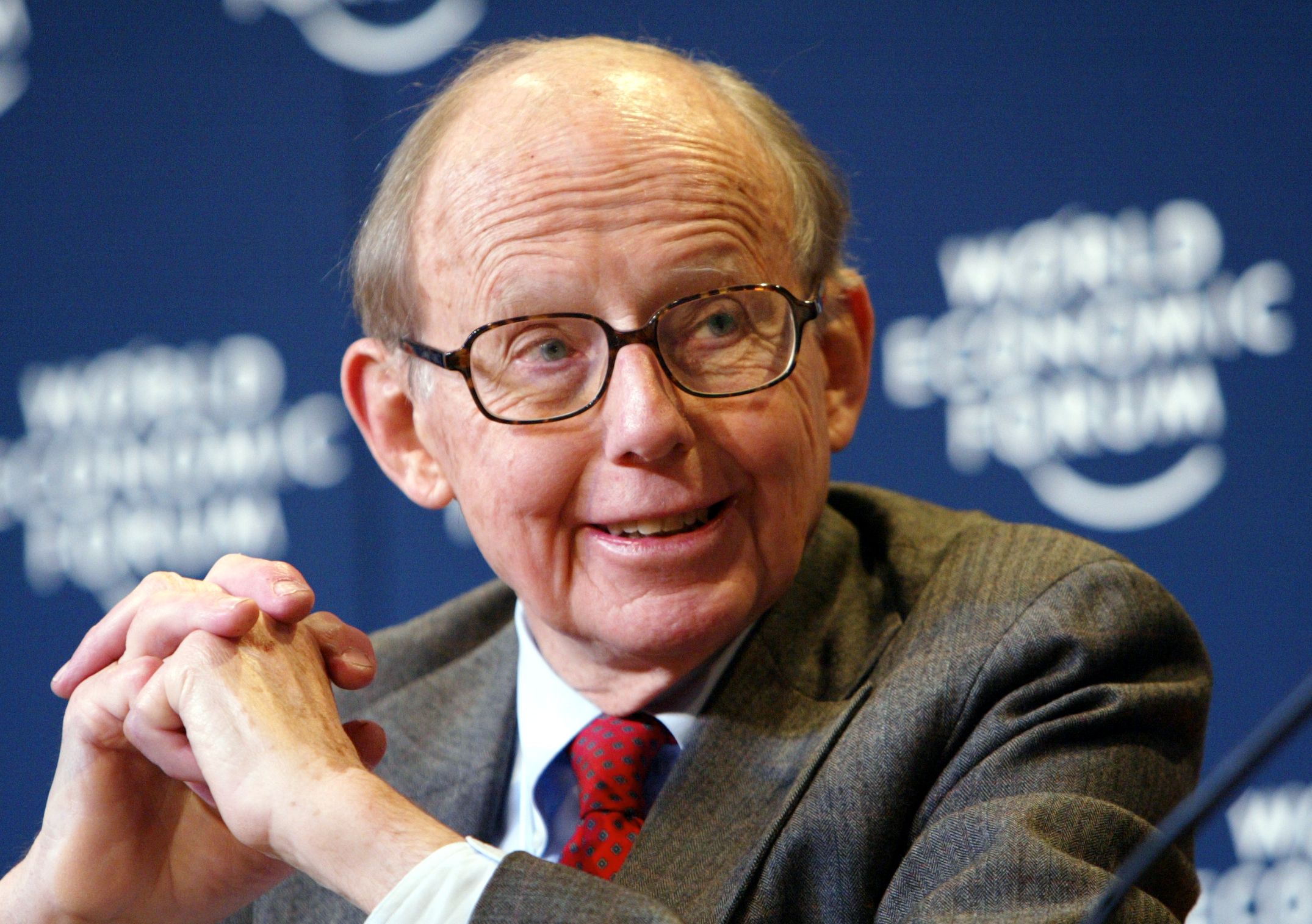
- Huntington in 2004
- Born: Samuel Phillips Huntington; April 18, 1927; New York City, U.S.
- Died: December 24, 2008 (aged 81); Martha's Vineyard, Massachusetts, U.S.
- Political party: Democratic
- Spouse: Nancy Arkelyan (m. 1957)

Academic background
- Education: Yale University (BA); University of Chicago (MA); Harvard University (PhD)
- Thesis: Clientelism: A Study in Administrative Politics (1951)
- Influences: Zbigniew Brzezinski; Feliks Koneczny

Academic work
- Discipline: Political science International relations
- Institutions: Harvard University; Columbia University
- Doctoral students: Fareed Zakaria; Stephen Peter Rosen; Joel S. Migdal; Scott Sagan; Aaron Friedberg; Peter Feaver; Eliot A. Cohen; Francis Fukuyama
- Notable works: Political Order in Changing Societies (1968); The Clash of Civilizations and the Remaking of World Order (1996)
- Notable ideas: Clash of civilizations; forced draft urbanization; Great Divergence; political decay
- Influenced: Francis Fukuyama; Kris Kobach; James Kurth; John Mearsheimer; Nawaf Obaid; Amos Perlmutter; Wang Huning

Samuel Phillips Huntington (April 18, 1927 – December 24, 2008) was an American political scientist, adviser, and academic. He was the Albert J. Weatherhead III University Professor at Harvard University, where he directed the Weatherhead Center for International Affairs.

During the presidency of Jimmy Carter, Huntington was the White House coordinator of security planning for the National Security Council.

Huntington is known best for his 1993 theory, the "Clash of Civilizations" otherwise known as COC, of a post–Cold War new world order. He argued that future wars would be fought not between countries, but between cultures, and that Islamic civilization would become the greatest threat to Western domination of the world. Huntington is credited with helping to shape American opinions on civilian-military relations, political development, and comparative government. According to the Open Syllabus Project, Huntington is the second most frequently cited author on college syllabi for political science courses in the USA.

== Early life and education ==
Huntington was born on April 18, 1927, in New York City, the son of Richard Thomas Huntington, a publisher of hotel trade journals, and Dorothy Sanborn (née Phillips), a short-story writer. His grandfather was publisher John Sanborn Phillips. He graduated with distinction from Yale University at age 18. He served in the U.S. Army from April 1946 to May 1947 and was stationed at Fort Eustis, Virginia. He then earned his Master of Arts from the University of Chicago and completed his Ph.D. at Harvard University, where he began teaching at age 23.

== Academic career ==
Huntington was a member of Harvard's department of government from 1950 until he was denied tenure in 1959. Along with Zbigniew Brzezinski, who had also been denied tenure, he moved to Columbia University in New York. From 1959 to 1962 he was an associate professor of government at Columbia, where he was also associate director of their Institute of War and Peace Studies. Huntington was invited to return to Harvard with tenure in 1963 and remained there until his death. He was elected a Fellow of the American Academy of Arts and Sciences in 1965. Huntington and Warren Demian Manshel co-founded and co-edited Foreign Policy. Huntington stayed as co-editor until 1977.

Huntington's first major book was The Soldier and the State: The Theory and Politics of Civil-Military Relations (1957), which was highly controversial when it was published, but at present is regarded as the most influential book on American civil-military relations. He became prominent with his Political Order in Changing Societies (1968), a work that challenged the conventional opinion of modernization theorists, that economic and social progress would produce stable democracies in recently decolonized countries. He also was co-author of The Crisis of Democracy: On the Governability of Democracies, a report issued by the Trilateral Commission in 1976. In 1977, his friend Brzezinski—who had been appointed national security adviser in the administration of Jimmy Carter—invited Huntington to become White House coordinator of security planning for the National Security Council. He served in this position until the end of 1978.

Huntington served as an instructor at MIT Seminar XXI. He continued to teach undergraduates until his retirement in 2007.

== Personal life ==
Huntington met his wife, Nancy Arkelyan, when they were working together on a speech for 1956 presidential candidate Adlai Stevenson. They had two sons, Nicholas and Timothy.

After several years of declining health, Huntington died on December 24, 2008, at age 81 in Martha's Vineyard.

== Notable arguments ==
=== The Soldier and the State ===
In The Soldier and the State: The Theory and Politics of Civil-Military Relations (1957), Huntington presents a general theory of civil–military relations. Huntington proposes a theory of objective civilian control, according to which the optimal means of asserting control over the armed forces is to professionalize them.

=== Political Order in Changing Societies ===
In 1968, just as the United States' war in Vietnam was becoming most intense, Huntington published Political Order in Changing Societies, which was a critique of the modernization theory which had affected much US policy regarding the developing world during the prior decade.

Huntington argued that as societies modernize, they become more complex and disordered. If the process of social modernization that produces this disorder is not matched by a process of political and institutional modernization—a process which produces political institutions capable of managing the stress of modernization—the result may be violence.

During the 1970s, Huntington was an advisor to governments, both democratic and dictatorial. During 1972, he met with Medici government representatives in Brazil; a year later he published the report "Approaches to Political Decompression", warning against the risks of a too-rapid political liberalization, proposing gradual liberalization, and a strong party state modeled upon the image of the Mexican Institutional Revolutionary Party. After a prolonged transition, Brazil became democratic during 1985.

During the 1980s, he became a valued adviser to the South African regime, which used his ideas on political order to craft its "total strategy" to reform apartheid and suppress growing resistance. He assured South Africa's rulers that increasing the repressive power of the state (which at that time included police violence, detention without trial, and torture) can be necessary to effect reform. The reform process, he told his South African audience, often requires "duplicity, deceit, faulty assumptions and purposeful blindness." He thus gave his imprimatur to his hosts' project of "reforming" apartheid rather than eliminating it.

Huntington frequently cited Brazil as a success, alluding to his role in his 1988 presidential address to the American Political Science Association, commenting that political science played a modest role in this process. Critics, such as British political scientist Alan Hooper, note that contemporary Brazil has an especially unstable party system, wherein the best institutionalized party, Luiz Inácio Lula da Silva's Workers' Party, emerged in opposition to controlled transition. Moreover, Hooper claims that the lack of civil participation in contemporary Brazil results from that top-down process of political participation transitions.

=== The Third Wave ===
In his 1991 book The Third Wave: Democratization in the Late Twentieth Century, Huntington made the argument that beginning with Portugal's revolution during 1974, there has been a third wave of democratization which describes a global trend which includes more than 60 countries throughout Europe, Latin America, Asia, and Africa which have undergone some form of democratic transition. Huntington won the 1992 University of Louisville Grawemeyer Award for this book.

=== "The Clash of Civilizations" ===
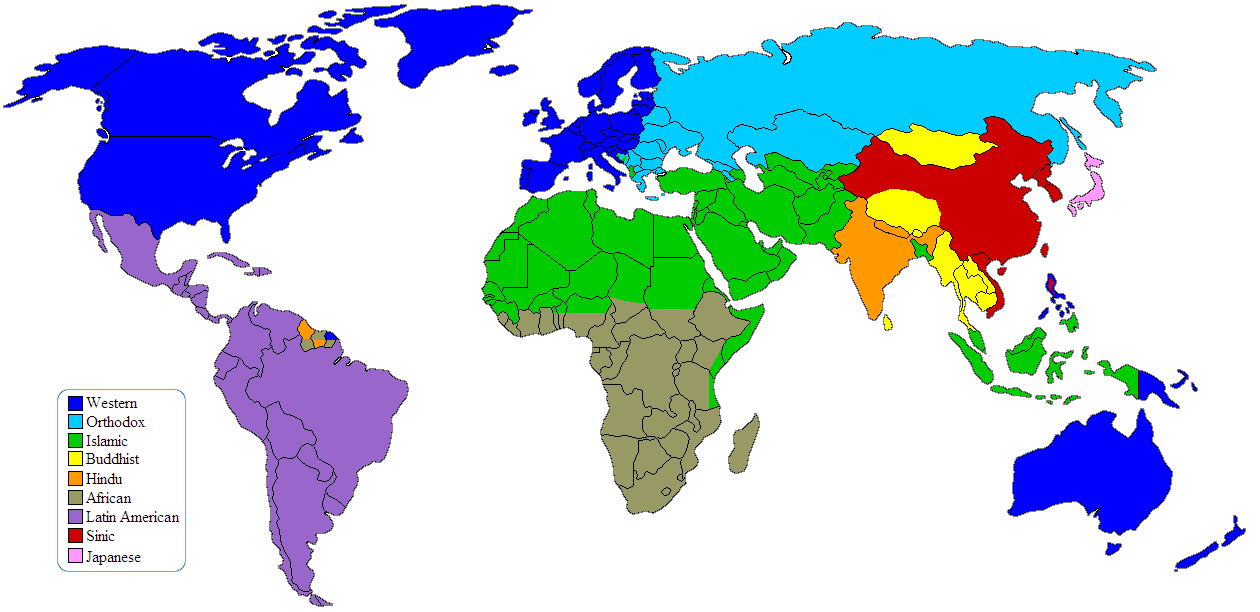
Map of the nine "civilizations" from Huntington's "Clash of Civilizations"

In 1993, Huntington provoked great debate among international relations theorists with the interrogatively titled "The Clash of Civilizations?", an influential, oft-cited article published in Foreign Affairs magazine. In the article, he argued that, after the fall of the Soviet Union, Islam would become the biggest obstacle to Western domination of the world. The West's next big war therefore, he said, would inevitably be with Islam. Its description of post-Cold War geopolitics and the "inevitability of instability" contrasted with the influential "End of History" thesis advocated by Francis Fukuyama.

Huntington expanded "The Clash of Civilizations?" to book length and published it as The Clash of Civilizations and the Remaking of World Order in 1996. The article and the book posit that post-Cold War conflict would most frequently and violently occur because of cultural rather than ideological differences. That, whilst in the Cold War, conflict occurred between the Capitalist Western Bloc and the Communist Eastern Bloc, it now was most likely to occur between the world's major civilizations—identifying eight, and a possible ninth: (i) Western, (ii) Latin American, (iii) Islamic, (iv) Sinic (Chinese), (v) Hindu, (vi) Orthodox, (vii) Japanese, (viii) African, and (ix) Buddhist. This cultural organization contrasts the contemporary world with the classical notion of sovereign states. To understand current and future conflict, cultural rifts must be understood, and culture—rather than the State—must be accepted as the reason for war. Thus, Western nations will lose predominance if they fail to recognize the irreconcilable nature of cultural tensions. Huntington argued that this post-Cold War shift in geopolitical organization and structure requires the West to strengthen itself culturally, by abandoning the imposition of its ideal of democratic universalism and its incessant military interventionism. Underscoring this point, Huntington wrote in the 1996 expansion, "In the emerging world of ethnic conflict and civilizational clash, Western belief in the universality of Western culture suffers three problems: it is false; it is immoral; and it is dangerous."

The identification of Western Civilization with Western Christianity (Catholic-Protestant) was not Huntington's original idea, it was rather the traditional Western opinion and subdivision before the Cold War era. Critics (for example articles in Le Monde diplomatique) call The Clash of Civilizations and the Remaking of World Order the theoretical legitimization of American-caused Western aggression against China and the world's Islamic and Orthodox cultures. Other critics argue that Huntington's taxonomy is simplistic and arbitrary, and does not take account of the internal dynamics and partisan tensions within civilizations. Furthermore, critics argue that Huntington neglects ideological mobilization by elites and unfulfilled socioeconomic needs of the population as the real causal factors driving conflict, that he ignores conflicts that do not fit well with the civilizational borders identified by him, and that his new paradigm is nothing but realist thinking in which "states" became replaced by "civilizations". Huntington's influence upon US policy has been likened to that of historian Arnold Toynbee's controversial religious theories about Asian leaders during the early twentieth century. The New York Times obituary on Huntington states that his "emphasis on ancient religious empires, as opposed to states or ethnicities, [as sources of global conflict] gained ... more cachet after the Sept. 11 attacks."

Huntington wrote that Ukraine might divide along the cultural line between the more Catholic western Ukraine and Orthodox eastern Ukraine:

While a statist approach highlights the possibility of a Russian-Ukrainian war, a civilizational approach minimizes that and instead highlights the possibility of Ukraine splitting in half, a separation which cultural factors would lead one to predict might be more violent than that of Czechoslovakia but far less bloody than that of Yugoslavia.

=== Who Are We and immigration ===
Huntington's last book, Who Are We? The Challenges to America's National Identity, was published in May 2004. Its subject is the meaning of American national identity and what he describes as a cultural threat from large-scale immigration by Latinos, which Huntington says could "divide the United States into two peoples, two cultures, and two languages". In this book, he called for America to force immigrants to "adopt English" and the US to turn to "Protestant religions" to "save itself against the threats" of Latino and Islamic immigrants. In a book review for the academic journal Perspectives on Politics, Gary M. Segura, Dean of the UCLA School of Public Affairs, asserted that the book should not be considered social science because of its divisive views and rhetoric. Segura also called Huntington's writing of the book unforgivable on account of Huntington's academic position, saying that the work was a polemic rather than a work of scholarship.

=== Other ===
Huntington's work on foreign affairs and Western culture was praised by Roger Scruton for its strong influence on contemporary conservatism. Based on his Clash of Civilizations theory, Huntington had advised conservatives to embrace "robust nationalism", which is based on the core values of conservatism. Huntington is also credited with inventing the term Davos Man, referring to global elites who "have little need for national loyalty, view national boundaries as obstacles that thankfully are vanishing, and see national governments as residues from the past whose only useful function is to facilitate the elite's global operations". The term relates to the World Economic Forum in Davos, Switzerland, where leaders of economic globalization meet.

== National Academy of Sciences controversy ==
In 1986, Huntington was nominated for membership to the National Academy of Sciences. The nomination was opposed by Serge Lang, a Yale University mathematician inspired by the writings of mathematician Neal Koblitz, who had accused Huntington of misusing mathematics and engaging in pseudo-science. Lang claimed that Huntington distorted the historical record and used pseudo-mathematics to make his conclusions seem convincing. Lang's campaign succeeded; Huntington was twice nominated and twice rejected. A detailed description of these events was published by Lang in "Academia, Journalism, and Politics: A Case Study: The Huntington Case" which occupies the first 222 pages of his 1998 book Challenges.

Huntington's prominence as a Harvard professor and director of Harvard's Center for International Affairs led to significant media coverage of his defeated nomination to the NAS, including by The New York Times and The New Republic. His supporters included Herbert A. Simon, a 1978 laureate of the Sveriges Riksbank Prize in Economic Sciences in Memory of Alfred Nobel. Simon and Koblitz debated in multiple issues of Mathematical Intelligencer, with other mathematicians joining in through Letters to the Editors column.

== Selected publications ==
- "National Policy and the Transoceanic Navy." United States Naval Institute Proceedings 80, 5 (May 1954): pages 483–493. online
- The Soldier and the State: The Theory and Politics of Civil-Military Relations (1957)
- The Common Defense: Strategic Programs in National Politics (1961)
- Political Order in Changing Societies (1968)
- The Crisis of Democracy: On the Governability of Democracies with Michel Crozier and Joji Watanuki (1976)
- Political Power: USA USSR - Similarities and contrasts, Convergence or evolution with Zbigniew Brzezinski (1977)
- American Politics: The Promise of Disharmony (1981)
- "Democracy's third wave." Journal of democracy 2.2 (1991): pages 12–34. online
- The Third Wave: Democratization in the Late Twentieth Century (1991)
- The Clash of Civilizations and the Remaking of World Order (1996)
- "After twenty years: the future of the third wave." Journal of democracy 8.4 (1997): pages 3–12. online
- "Robust nationalism." The National Interest 58 (1999): 31–40.
- Who Are We? The Challenges to America's National Identity (2004), based on the article The Hispanic Challenge, Foreign Policy, March/April 2004

As editor:

- Culture Matters: How Values Shape Human Progress with Lawrence E. Harrison (2000)
- Many Globalizations : Cultural Diversity in the Contemporary World with Peter L. Berger (2002)

== See also ==
- Clash of civilizations
- Civil-military relations
- Historical institutionalism
- Historical sociology
- Intermediate Region
- International relations theory
- Modernization theory
- New institutionalism
- Political geography
- Western civilization

Academic offices
New office	Albert J. Weatherhead III University Professor	Succeeded by Gary King
Professional and academic associations
Preceded by Aaron Wildavsky	President of the American; Political Science Association; 1986–1987	Succeeded by Kenneth Waltz
Awards
Preceded by World Commission on Environment and Development	Grawemeyer Award for Ideas Improving World Order; 1992; With: John B. Cobb and Herman Daly	Succeeded by Donald Akenson
