= America at the Crossroads =

Book by Francis Fukuyama

America at the Crossroads: Democracy, Power, and the Neoconservative Legacy
- Author: Francis Fukuyama
- Language: English
- Genre: Non-fiction
- Publication date: 2006

America at the Crossroads: Democracy, Power, and the Neoconservative Legacy is a 2006 book written by Francis Fukuyama.

This book briefly discusses the history of neoconservatism, with particular focus on its major tenets and political implications. Fukuyama outlines his rationale for supporting the Bush administration, as well as where he believes it has gone wrong. Fukuyama argues that the Iraq invasion was poorly planned and orchestrated, and that the George W. Bush administration underestimated the social construction that would be necessary to create a new democracy after the war.

Fukuyama highlights the controversies that surround neoconservatism, describing how it has evolved into something he can no longer support.^{1} He suggests that neoconservativism can be described as having four common principles through the end of the Cold War:

- A belief that the internal character of regimes matters and that foreign policy must reflect the deepest values of liberal democratic societies.
- A belief that American power has been and could be used for moral purposes, and that the United States needs to remain engaged in international affairs.
- A distrust of ambitious social engineering projects.
- A skepticism about the legitimacy and effectiveness of international law and institutions to achieve either security or justice.

At the conclusion of the book, Fukuyama proposes a new order in international politics, stating the world needs a change in its actual institutions, advocating what he calls multi-multilateralism.

== Contents ==
=== Preface ===
In this part, the author explains what the book is about:

The subject of this book is American foreign policy since the al-Qaida attacks of September 11, 2001. This is a personal subject for me. Having long regarded myself as a neoconservative, I thought I shared a common worldview with other neoconservatives-including friends and acquaintances who served in the administration of George W. Bush.

— Francis Fukuyama, America at the Crossroads: Democracy, Power and the Neoconservative Legacy, Preface, ix

He goes on to name many people with whom he associated, such as Paul D. Wolfowitz, Wolfowitz' teacher Albert Wohlstetter, Fukuyama's own teacher Allan Bloom and Bloom's teacher Leo Strauss, his former classmate William Kristol and his father Irving Kristol, for whom Fukuyama had written many articles in his magazines (The National Interest, The Public Interest, Commentary).

Fukuyama became more aware of his disagreements with the movement when, in February 2004, he attended the annual dinner at the AEI and listened to a speech by Charles Krauthammer which "treated the [Iraq] war as a virtually unqualified success". Fukuyama subsequently wrote a reaction to the speech and concluded "that neoconservatism, both as a political system and a body of thought, has evolved into something that I can no longer support." The principles it was based on had worked during the Cold War, both for the domestic front as well as in foreign policy – but subsequent interpretations had put too much emphasis on military force.

=== Principles and prudence ===
Fukuyama names the policies the George W. Bush Administration took as a response to the September 11 attacks by the jihadist group al-Qaida, such as the creation the Department of Homeland Security and the USA PATRIOT Act and the invasion of Taliban-occupied Afghanistan that had sheltered al-Qaida. It had also declared a policy of preventive war and deposed the Saddam Hussein regime because it was believed Saddam Hussein had or planned to acquire WMDs. He states the first set of policies were inevitable, but the preventive war doctrine and Iraq war were "not obvious responses" and were based on an over-militarized interpretation of neoconservatism, linked to "concepts like preemption, regime change, unilateralism, and benevolent hegemony". He asserts a new school of American foreign policy is needed next to the neoconservative, the "Kissingerian" realist, liberal internationalist and "Jacksonian" nationalist. He proposes a "realistic Wilsonianism that better matches means to ends in dealing with other societies." 'Realistic Wilsonianism' would differ from realism because of its support for nation-building and democracy promotion, and from neoconservatism and Jacksonian nationalism as it would take international institutions seriously. The state would still be the source of accountability and power (thus differing from liberal internationalism, that would like to transcend the nation-state and power politics). Both the challenges of development and a multi-institutional global order are not adequately responded to by the traditional schools, the author claims.

=== The neoconservative legacy ===
In this part, Fukuyama traces back the intellectual roots of neoconservatism and its subsequent evolution.

First, Fukuyama discusses the "enormous amount of ink [that] was spilled on the subject of neoconservatives and their alleged capture of the Bush administration." The author claims all kinds of conspiracy theories were launched by many political rivals of the Iraq War, such as Elizabeth Drew. Fukuyama claims that the fact that many neoconservatives in the Bush Administration were Jewish, like Wolfowitz and Feith, made many critics believe the invasion of Iraq was in Israel's interest while others claimed that Strauss – who was a major inspiration of the movement – had defended the idea of "the noble lie" and that elites were thus allegedly allowed to lie in the public interest, which the neocons did, according to this reasoning, in the case of Iraq and weapons of mass destruction. Fukuyama says this is all wrong, and that neoconservatism was strongly rooted in several American traditions and that there was diversity of ideas within the movement itself. He names and describes the roots of the movement:

- City College: a group of largely Jewish New York intellectuals of the Anti-Stalinist left attended CCNY from the 1930s to the early 1940s. These include people like Irving Kristol, Seymour Martin Lipset, Daniel Bell, Nathan Glazer and several others. They eventually became anticommunists as they "came to realize that "real existing socialism" had become a monstrosity of unintended consequences that completely undermined the idealistic goals it espoused." The revelations of Stalinist Terror and the American participation in World War II, that proved that the capitalist US could wield its power for moral purposes, pushed them further to the political right.
- The Public Interest: a magazine founded by Irving Kristol and Daniel Bell (soon replaced by Nathan Glazer), it attracted many contributors such as James Q. Wilson, Moynihan and Charles Murray in the 1960s when the New Left and Counterculture became popular among students radicals who protested the Vietnam War. They supported initiatives like the Great Society and were often sympathetic to communist regimes like North Vietnam and Cuba, Fukuyama claims. These contributors were critical of large-scale social engineering and eventually contributed to the domestic policy and welfare reforms like the Personal Responsibility and Work Opportunity Reconciliation Act of 1996.
- Leo Strauss: Fukuyama starts by declaring that "more nonsense has been written about Leo Strauss and the Iraq war than on virtually any other subject." He criticises many writers and suggests Mark Lilla has written a better account of Strauss' philosophy. Fukuyama claims there is little Direct Influence of Bush Administration people and policy and Strauss:

If you were to ask Dick Cheney, Donald Rumsfeld, or President Bush himself who Leo Strauss was, you would probably draw blank stares. The idea of Straussian influence gained currency only because Paul Wolfowitz, the deputy secretary of defense, studied briefly with Strauss and with Allan Bloom, who was himself a student of Strauss. But Wolfowitz never regarded himself as a Strauss protégé, and his foreign policy views were much more heavily influenced by other teachers, in particular Albert Wohlstetter.

— Francis Fukuyama, America at the Crossroads: Democracy, Power and the Neoconservative Legacy, The Neoconservative Legacy, p. 21

Strauss didn't write about political issues, but was interested in the "theological-political problem" of claims of 'the good life' and tried to respond to modern moral relativism by bringing back premodern Greek philosophy. Later generations of Strauss students did (try to) interpret his thought to prescribe policies or take positions in socio-political issues. Allan Bloom, a former professor of Fukuyama, had written The Closing of the American Mind in which he criticized contemporary American popular culture of cultural relativism and student radicalism and intellectual endeavors like postmodernism that had found their roots in the philosophical work of Nietzsche and Heidegger, Fukuyama states. He thus provided the neoconservative movement with "a much deeper understanding of the sources of weakness of contemporary liberal democracy." Strauss did introduce one idea crucial for the justification of the Iraq War, namely the "regime" – that is, in ancient Greek philosophy, the collection of formal political institutions and informal socio-cultural habits who shape one another and who shape the character of its people. The toppling of Saddam Hussein's regime was thus, neocons could claim according to Fukuyama, the best policy to prevent Hussein's aggressive and authoritarian politics. But, Fukuyama claims, a profound understanding would have warned the Bush Administration of the difficulty of this democratic transition, as informal habits play a fundamental role too.

- Albert Wohlstetter: Wohlstetter was a mathematical logician, system and military strategist who taught several Bush people including Richard Perle and Zalmay Khalilzad. He had worked at the RAND Corporation and later was a professor at the University of Chicago. He had two major concerns: (1) extended deterrence, which meant that having a minimal nuclear deterrent isn't enough so that further investment was needed to have second-strike capabilities – an important part of Cold War deterrence theory; (2) nuclear proliferation and a skepticism towards the 1968 Nonproliferation Treaty which maintained the right to enrich uranium for civilian use while, in his view, a sharp distinction between civilian and military use was impossible to make in practice. These two concerns and his views drove him to be skeptical of MAD and he argued that, in a counterforce scenario, the Soviet Union could be willing to accept massive casualties for political ends, thus neglecting deterrence. These views were incorporated in the Reagan Doctrine of the 1980s, Fukuyama claims. He was also concerned with increasing targeting precision to minimize civilian casualties, thus aiding the 1990s revolution in military technology which would drive the US Army to become a lighter and more mobile force and wage war at low cost, Fukuyama states.

Fukuyama writes that these groups lay the foundation of the neoconservative movement, although they politically ended up in different places, e.g. Irving Kristol became a Republican supporter of Ronald Reagan while Patrick Moynihan remained a Democrat and voted against the 1996 welfare reform bill. Neocons generally shared an opposition to political realism such as implemented by Henry Kissinger in the 1970s who tried to have a 'détente' with the USSR, Fukuyama writes. Realists generally believe communist or nondemocratic regimes are not necessarily superior to liberal-democratic regimes, because all states just desire power, Fukuyama claims. Under the Reagan Administration, the Cold War was remoralised, as clearly observable in the "evil empire" speech by Reagan. Neocons then integrated in the conservative movement, both because conservatives in general took over neoconservative opinions and because neoconservatives took over 'traditional' conservative ideas, such as support for free-market economics, Fukuyama states. However, the great diversity that had existed within the movement was in the 1990s replaced by an (in Fukuyama's opinion) overmilitarised version introduced by Robert Kagan and William Kristol (Irving Kristol's son) that was also called "hard Wilsonianism" or "Wilsonianism minus international institutions". Fukuyama says their interpretation has come to define neoconservatism, and that "it is an uphill struggle to try to redefine neoconservative foreign policy after the fact."

Fukuyama gives the four core principles of neoconservatism, as he sees them:

1. A belief that the internal character of regimes matters and that foreign policy must reflect the deepest values of liberal democratic societies.
2. A belief that American power has been and could be used for moral purposes, and that the United States needs to remain engaged in international affairs.
3. A distrust of ambitious social engineering projects.
4. A skepticism about the legitimacy and effectiveness of international law and institutions to achieve either security or justice. (Especially towards the UN; it is generally more favorable towards multilateral cooperation with other democracies such as in NATO, although European democracies were often skeptical of the Iraq War.)

The fact that the Bush administration took a 'Leninist' (short-term, forceful) view of the End of history instead of Fukuyama's 'Marxist' (long-term, gradual) teleology – a metaphor used by Ken Jowitt and endorsed by Fukuyama- made them overly optimistic. He also criticises the overly skeptic view of the 'international community' in instances like the Iraq War or the Kyoto Protocol.

=== Threat, risk, and preventive war ===
Fukuyama here discusses the policy responses of the Bush Administration to 9/11 and critiques them. He argues the threat perception of Islamic extremism/jihadism put together with WMDs made them miscalculate the actual threat, because – he believes – the chance that non-state actors could acquire them is small and that only a small number of Muslims would support jihadi terrorism and that suicide terrorism is not inherent to Islam as a religion, but because of the process of modernisation that the Greater Middle East and Muslim minorities in Europe are confronted with in which alienated Muslims struggle about their identity (as posited by Olivier Roy and Gilles Kepel). Fukuyama thus advises smaller scale military activities and "a battle for hearts and minds" of Muslims instead of 'World War IV' or 'Clash of Civilizations' rhetoric. Fukuyama also states there were several alternative cases for the Iraq War (other than WMDs, an al-Qaida connection or democracy promotion), such as the untenability of the sanctions regime or arguing it was a global public good to prevent the nuclear proliferation of the Middle East. These were not used, Fukuyama claims. Instead, the Bush Administration outlined a policy of 'preemption' – however, Fukuyama claims the Iraq War was rather a war of prevention, where a lot of mistakes can be made (as he cites Ken Jowitt):

So the logic behind an anticipatory strategy is powerful. But its strategic application demands the combined wisdom of Pericles and Solomon. To begin with, the premise for an anticipatory attack posits a hostile leader and regime platonically impervious to any environmental changes whether domestic or international. This is not always a mistaken premise – Hitler and Pol Pot are cases in point – but it is almost always mistaken. Over time, most regimes do change substantially if not essentially. One has only to look at the Soviet Union after 1956 and China after 1978.

— Ken Jowitt, Rage, Hubris, and Regime Change: The Urge to Speed History Along

Then Fukuyama asks whether there was justified risk, which he argues there was not because the Bush Administration had far overrated Saddam Hussein's capability to acquire WMDs and wouldn't give credit to UN inspection estimates or US intelligence findings.

=== American exceptionalism and international legitimacy ===
The author focuses on the problem of "American exceptionalism" – a form of US-centrism – which had made the Bush Administration blind to world public opinion and the structural anti-Americanism in the international system, Fukuyama writes.

=== Social engineering and the problems of development ===
Fukuyama posits that two fundamental principles of neoconservatism may collide in the area of political and economic development: on the one hand, neoconservatives are concerned about the internal character of a regime, thus democracy-promotion and human rights are important considerations in foreign policy (unlike for political realists); on the other hand, there is a danger in large-scale social engineering which could have unintended consequences as a result. On the domestic front, neocons like James Q. Wilson had warned about extensive social programs and the Bush Administration should have put this principle into practice in foreign policy as well, Fukuyama asserts. Fukuyama cites an interview by Dick Cheney in which the Vice President said: "to suggest we need several 100.000 troops there, after the conflict ends, I don't think it's accurate... I really do believe we will be greeted as liberators." President George W. Bush remarked at a speech that democratic desires are a human universal, but Fukuyama contrasts this to his own thesis of "The End of History" and caution: "One can argue that there is a universal human desire to be free of tyranny and a universalism to the appeal of life in a prosperous liberal democracy. The problem is one of timeframe involved. It is one thing to say that there is a broad, centuries-long trend towards the spread of liberal democracy – something that I myself have strongly argued in the past- and another to say that either democracy or prosperity can emerge in a given society at a given time. There are certain critical intervening variables known as institutions. And if there is one thing that the study of democratic transition and political development teaches, is that institutions are very difficult to establish." Neoconservatives ignored by and large development and put too much emphasis on defense.

==== Economic development ====
The author talks about the history and challenges in economic development aid, beginning with the 1940s Harrod-Domar growth model through the Cold War struggle over influence and economic orthodoxy in the 1980s to 1990s and (in 2006 present day) 2000s debates on development, especially involving institutions (a subject he would tackle in his 2011 book The Origins of Political Order: From Prehuman times to the French Revolution and 2014 book Political Order and Political Decay: From the Industrial Revolution to the Globalisation of Democracy) and institutional economics.

==== Political development ====
Debate on political development and the creation and evolution of institutions.

=== Rethinking institutions for world order ===
Here, the author discusses international institutions: their importance, complexity and diversity and the evolution towards a multi-institutional world order.

=== Adifferent kind of american foreign policy ===
Here, Fukuyama proposes a demilitarisation of US foreign policy, a counterinsurgency campaign against Global Jihadism (rather than "World War IV" or militarised rhetoric), support for good governance and suggests Otto von Bismarck is a good inspiration for the US if it wants a good balance between power projection and international legitimacy.

== Publication history ==
- Yale University Press, 2006, hardcover (ISBN 0-300-11399-4).

== See also ==
- The End of History and the Last Man

== Reviews ==
- Berman, Paul (March 26, 2006). "Neo No More". The New York Times. ISSN 0362-4331.
- "America at the Crossroads: Democracy, Power, and the Neoconservative Legacy". Foreign Affairs. January 28, 2009. ISSN 0015-7120.
- Ahued, Francisco Vázquez (2006). "America at the Crossroads: Democracy, Power, and the Neoconservative Legacy – Francis Fukuyama". Politics & Policy. 34 (3): 661–664. doi:10.1111/j.1747-1346.2006.00033.x. ISSN 1747-1346.
