= Ken Jowitt =

American political scientist

Kenneth Jowitt (born 1940) is an American political scientist. He served as President and Maurine Hotchkis Senior Fellow at Stanford University's Hoover Institution and as the Robson Professor, emeritus, of Political Science at the University of California, Berkeley, positions he held since 2001 and 1995 respectively.

== Biography ==
Jowitt was born and raised in Ossining, New York, approximately thirty miles north of New York City. After graduating from Columbia University in 1962, Jowitt pursued post-graduate and doctoral studies at the University of California, Berkeley, earning his Master's in 1963 and his doctorate in 1970. Jowitt also spent some of his post-graduate life in Romania during the Ceauşescu regime, where he studied the political and cultural dynamics of post-Stalinist Communist Europe.

== Professional career ==
Jowitt has been a professor at UC-Berkeley since 1968. Among other honors and forms of recognition, he won the University Distinguished Teaching Award in 1983, and has been the recipient of two Stanford Hoover fellowships. From 1983 to 1986 he was dean of undergraduate studies at his alma mater, the University of California-Berkeley.

Focusing on social theory and comparative politics, Jowitt specializes in the study of post-Stalinist Eastern Europe and Communist studies. He has published numerous essays, articles, books, and scholarly theses related to these and other Cold War and post-Cold War era subjects.

One of Jowitt's more notable scholarly works is New World Disorder: The Leninist Extinction, a collection of essays written between 1974 and 1990 that focuses on the nature of Communist regimes. The last three essays argue against a popular early 1990s philosophy that espoused Western triumphalism, and the essays dispute the "end of history" theory propounded at the time by former neoconservative scholar Francis Fukuyama.

He also contributed an essay, entitled "In Praise of the Ordinary: An Essay on Democracy," to Adam Michnik's anthology, Letters from Freedom.

Jowitt is noted for receiving standing ovations at the conclusion of his course lectures at UC-Berkeley.

== Middle East ==
Jowitt has taken what some would consider a qualified, anti-Wilsonian stance with respect to the Global War on Terror, and criticizing—both in print and during public debates—writers such as David Frum, who have articulated a desire for the United States to change the Middle East into a more pluralistic, democratic region, primarily through military intervention.

Although he initially supported the 2003 invasion of Iraq, he later became a critic of what he viewed as an unwillingness on the part of the Bush administration to implement a "realist" foreign policy, especially with respect to the Middle East and the ongoing war on terror.

== Bibliography ==
- Revolutionary Breakthroughs and National Development: The Case of Romania. (University of California Press, 1971)
- The New World Disorder: The Leninist Extinction (University of California Press, 1992) {Review}
- "Really Imaginary Socialism", (East European Constitutional Review, spring/summer 1997)
- "In Praise of the Ordinary: An Essay on Democracy", published in Adam Michnik's Letters from Freedom (University of California Press, 1998)
- "Russia Disconnected", (Irish Slavonic Studies 19 [1998])
- "Challenging the Correct Line", (East European Politics and Society, fall 1998)
- "Ethnicity: Nice, Nasty, Nihilistic", in Ethnopolitical Warfare: Causes, Consequences, and Possible Solutions, ed. Daniel Chirot and Martin E. P. Seligman (American Psychological Association, 2001)
