= Our Posthuman Future =

2002 book by Francis Fukuyama

Our Posthuman Future: Consequences of the Biotechnology Revolution
- Author: Francis Fukuyama
- Publisher: Farrar, Straus and Giroux
- Publication date: 2002
- Pages: 272
- ISBN: 0-374-23643-7

Our Posthuman Future: Consequences of the Biotechnology Revolution is a 2002 book by Francis Fukuyama. In it, he discusses the potential threat to liberal democracy that use of new and emerging biotechnologies for transhumanist ends poses.

== Human nature ==
Fukuyama defines human nature as "the sum of the behavior and characteristics that are typical of the human species, arising from genetics rather than environmental factors." The "typicality" is further defined as a statistical phenomenon of the usual distribution of measured parameters describing human characteristics, such the normal distribution of height or intellectual quotient. The author recognizes that distinguishing "pathological" from "normal" is difficult, but insists that drawing the line between the two is not only possible, but is routinely achieved by regulatory agencies through a legislative process. "It has often seemed to me that the only people who can argue that there is no difference in principle between disease and health are those who have never been sick: if you have a virus or fracture your leg, you know perfectly well that something is wrong."

== Human dignity ==
Possession of moral choice, human language, reason, sociability, emotions, sentience, and consciousness constitute distinguishing qualities that differentiate humans from animals. Fukuyama refers to the irreducible totality of these qualities as "Factor X", "the complex whole" as opposed to "the sum of simple parts", which forms the foundation of human dignity. Moreover, he believes that "every member of the human species possesses a genetic endowment that allows him or her to become a whole human being, an endowment that distinguishes a human in essence from other types of creatures." Thus, he squarely places the source of human dignity in human genetics providing the argument against unregulated modification of human germline cells. Fukuyama argues that the moral status of human embryos is higher than that of human cells or human tissues because they possess "the potential to become a full human being." He concludes that "it is therefore reasonable, on non-religious grounds, to question whether researchers should be free to create, clone, and destroy human embryos at will."

== Human rights ==
Francis Fukuyama argues that informed discussion of human rights requires understanding of human purposes, which themselves rest on a concept of human nature and human dignity. Therefore, biotechnology targeting human nature will inevitably affect the discourse of values and politics. He provides several arguments to defend his human nature-based theory of rights:

1. Classic philosophical accounts by Socrates and Plato argue for the existence of human nature. Fukuyama believes that these classic accounts are too easily dismissed by "thoughtless contemporary commentators [who] sneer at Plato's "simplistic" psychology".
2. The Fallacy of "Naturalistic Fallacy". In response to the assertion that moral obligations cannot be derived from the observation of natural world ("naturalistic fallacy"), Fukuyama demonstrates that humans routinely use emotions to prioritize values. For example, the fear of violent death produces the basic right of life, which some will consider a value higher than the freedom of religion.
3. Inconsistencies in the views of libertarian legal theorists, John Rawls and Ronald Dworkin. For example, Fukuyama shows that John Rawls in "A Theory of Justice", appeals to apparent observations of human nature, such as genetically programmed social reciprocity. Ronald Dworkin, on the other hand, also appears to make assumptions about human nature: the existence of distinct natural human potential that can develop over time, efforts needed to cultivate this potential, and desirable choices of an individual regarding her potential.
4. Some decisions by the US Supreme Court "suggest priorities among the wide variety of human desires and purposes." For example, Fukuyama suggests that the US Supreme Court decision Casey vs. Planned Parenthood defends "moral autonomy as the most important human right."
5. Values make collective action possible. "Human beings also find great satisfaction in the fact that values and norms are shared. Solipsistically held values defeat their own purpose and lead to a highly dysfunctional society in which people are unable to work together for common ends."
6. Political history reveals the failure of political regimes which ignored the limits of human nature. For example, Fukuyama concludes that the ultimate failure of communism was caused by its "failure to respect the natural inclination to favor kin and private property."

== Political control of biotechnology ==
Fukuyama recognizes that translation of human nature into rights is difficult, but possible through a rational discussion of human ends. In his opinion, control of biotechnology is a political necessity. "Countries must regulate the development and use of technology politically, setting up institutions that will discriminate between those technological advances that promote human flourishing, and those that pose a threat to human dignity and well-being". He rejects the idea that "theology, philosophy, or politics" should not influence the scientific process, because "science by itself cannot establish the ends to which it is put." "Nazi doctors who injected concentration camp victims with infection agents... were in fact legitimate scientists who gathered real data that could potentially be put to good use." Therefore, morality is needed to establish the end of science and the technology that science produces, and pronounce on whether those ends are good or bad." Political process that could decide on the legitimate uses of science is enabled by a democratically constituted political community acting through elected and scientifically informed representatives.

Fukuyama rejects the notion that biotechnology cannot be controlled. Nuclear weapons, nuclear power, ballistic missiles, biological and chemical warfare, illegal human organ trade, neuropharmacological drugs, genetically modified foods, human experimentation have been the subject of effective international political control. Occasional breaking of the law, cannot be used as an excuse not to pursue legislature at all. "Every country makes murder a crime and attaches severe penalties to homicide, and yet murders nonetheless occur. The fact that they do has never been a reason for giving up on the law or on attempts to enforce it."

Author outlines several issues that need to be addressed to establish an effective international regulation of biotechnology:

1. Over-regulation can create inefficiencies, drive up the business costs, and stifle innovation.
2. While most regulatory initiatives begin domestically, to be truly effective the regulation needs to be negotiated, harmonized, and enacted on the international level.
3. Risks, benefits, and enforcement costs of biotechnology need to clearly defined.
4. Different ethical views of biotechnology throughout the world.
5. Different political systems throughout the world.

== Publication history ==
- Farrar Straus & Giroux, 2002, hardcover (ISBN 0-374-23643-7)
- Picador USA, 2003, paperback (ISBN 0-312-42171-0).

== See also ==
- The End of History and the Last Man
- Brave New World argument
- The Abolition of Man
