= Vetocracy =

Dysfunctional form of government where no entity has enough power to do anything

A vetocracy is a dysfunctional system of governance whereby no single entity can acquire enough power to make decisions and take effective charge. Coined by American political scientist Francis Fukuyama, the term points to an excessive ability or willingness to use the veto power within a government or institution, without an adequate means of any override. Such limitations may point to a lack of trust among members or hesitance to cede sovereignty. More veto points typically make it more difficult to pass legislation.

Some institutions which have been hampered by perceptions of vetocratic limitations, and even responsible for their downfall, include the Polish–Lithuanian Commonwealth, the Articles of Confederation, and the League of Nations. The present-day United Nations Security Council has been criticized for its inability to take decisive action due to the exclusive rights of veto power of permanent members.

Fukuyama suggests that public sector effectiveness in the U.S. is impeded by excessive vetoes. This can lead to populism and authoritarianism as voters become frustrated with paralysis. In the United States, a veto is not just held by the executive branch, but there are many other opportunities or veto points to derail a law throughout the political process.

== United States ==
The success rate of legislation in the U.S. in the modern era has dropped from ~7% to 2%, which could be due in part to partisanship making veto points more perilous for legislation.

=== Veto points for federal legislation in the United States ===
1. Representative to propose a bill
2. House Committee chair(s)
3. House Committee(s)
4. Hastert Rule
  - If the party in power decides to use it
5. US House of Representatives
6. Senate Committee chair(s)
7. Senate Committee(s)
8. Senate Filibuster
9. Senate
10. Senate Parliamentarian
11. President
  - note: can be overridden with 2/3 support
12. Supreme Court
13. Lobbyists (professionals and otherwise)
  - Corporate lobbying is roughly 4x greater than all other lobbying combined (34x that of public interest and labor lobbying)

=== Subnational governments ===
Vetocracy has been used to describe many state and local governments in the United States where unusually high infrastructure and housing costs are in part blamed on the many veto points.

== See also ==
- Consensus democracy
- Divided government in the United States
- Dominant minority
- Electoral accountability
- Gridlock (politics)
- Separation of powers
- Supermajority
- Unanimity
