= Divided government in the United States =

Divided control of the US government between political parties

In the United States of America, divided government is a situation in which one party controls the White House (executive branch), while another party controls one or both houses of the United States Congress (legislative branch). Divided government is seen by different groups as a benefit or as an undesirable product of the model of governance used in the U.S. political system. Under said model, known as the separation of powers, the state is divided into different branches.

Each branch has separate and independent powers and areas of responsibility so that the powers of one branch are not in conflict with the powers associated with the others. The degree to which the president of the United States has control of Congress often determines their political strength, such as the ability to pass sponsored legislation, ratify treaties, and have Cabinet members and judges approved. Early in the 19th century, divided government was rare. Since the 1970s it has become increasingly common.

== Features ==
The model can be contrasted with the fusion of powers in a parliamentary system where the executive and legislature, and sometimes parts of the judiciary, are unified. Those in favor of divided government believe that such separations encourage more policing of those in power by the opposition, as well as limiting spending and the expansion of undesirable laws. Opponents argue that divided governments become lethargic, leading to many gridlocks.

In the late 1980s, Terry M. Moe, a professor of political science at Stanford University, examined the issue. He concluded that divided governments lead to compromise which can be seen as beneficial, but he also noticed that divided governments subvert performance and politicize the decisions of executive agencies. Further research has shown that during divided governments, legislatures will pass laws with sunset provisions in order to achieve a political consensus.

== Party control of legislative and executive branches ==
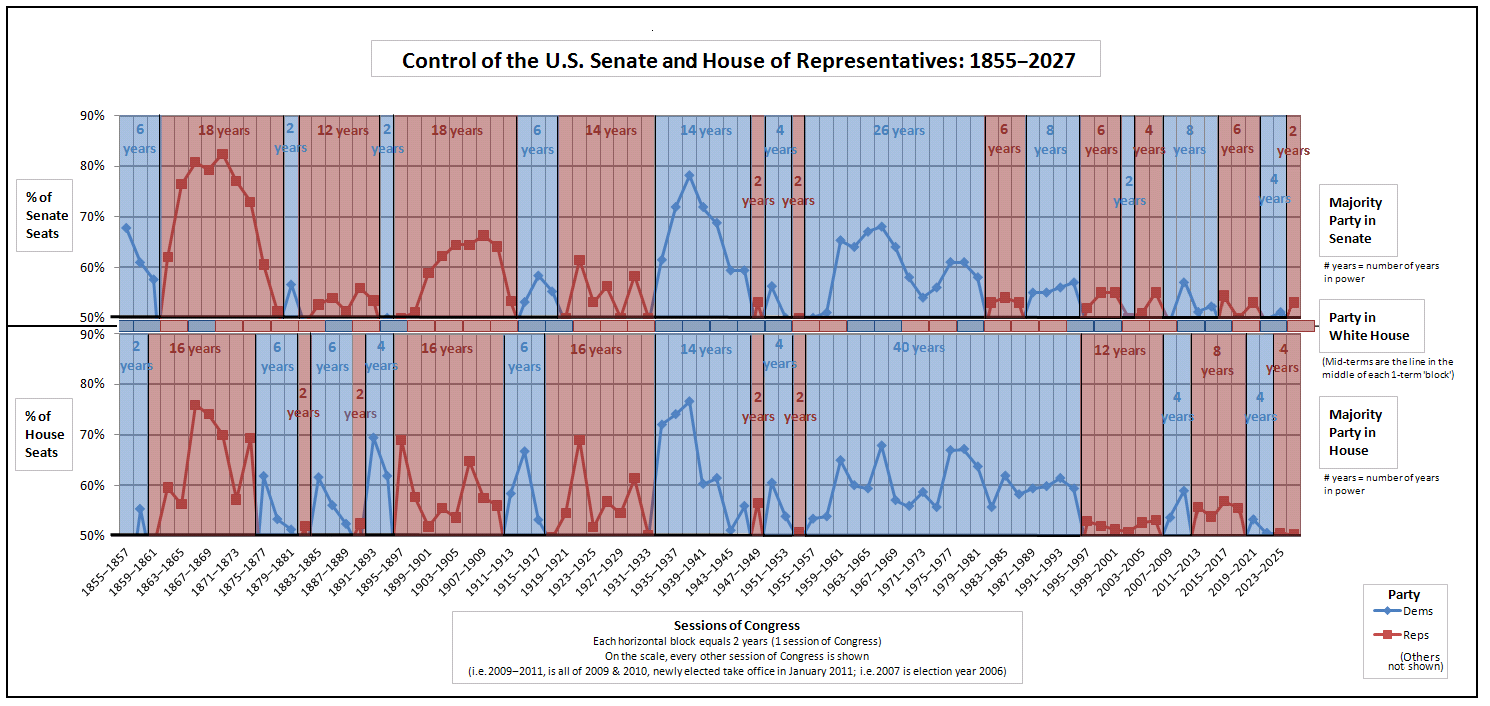
Party control of the U.S. Senate and House of Representatives (including president's party): 1855–2027

=== List ===
Key

- **D** denotes the Democratic Party, **DR** denotes the Democratic-Republican Party, **F** denotes the Federalist Party, **I** denotes the Independents, **NR** denotes the National Republican Party, **R** denotes the Republican Party, **W** denotes the Whig Party
- **Bold** indicates a divided government.

| Year | Senate | House | President party | President |
|---|---|---|---|---|
| **1789–1791** | **F** | **F** | **I** | Washington |
| **1791–1793** | **F** | **F** | **I** | Washington |
| **1793–1795** | **F** | **DR** | **I** | Washington |
| **1795–1797** | **F** | **DR** | **I** | Washington |
| 1797–1799 | F | F | F | J. Adams |
| 1799–1801 | F | F | F | J. Adams |
| 1801–1803 | DR | DR | DR (Note: When Democratic-Republican Thomas Jefferson began his presidency in March 1801, the Senate held a two-day special Senate session with an ongoing Federalist majority (without the Democratic-Republican House in session), which briefly stalled the inauguration of a Democratic-Republican trifecta government, though the session was only called by outgoing president John Adams so that the Senate could provide advice to the new president. By the time the Congress began its first regular session in December 1801 to start official business the Democratic-Republicans had gained the Senate majority and thus, with the House and with President Jefferson, held the full trifecta of government throughout that first session and for the next several years. "Congressional Record, March 1801" (PDF). Congressional Record: 147–151. March 1801."Explanation of the Types of Sessions of Congress". The Green Papers. June 2001.) | Jefferson |
| 1803–1805 | DR | DR | DR | Jefferson |
| 1805–1807 | DR | DR | DR | Jefferson |
| 1807–1809 | DR | DR | DR | Jefferson |
| 1809–1811 | DR | DR | DR | Madison |
| 1811–1813 | DR | DR | DR | Madison |
| 1813–1815 | DR | DR | DR | Madison |
| 1815–1817 | DR | DR | DR | Madison |
| 1817–1819 | DR | DR | DR | Monroe |
| 1819–1821 | DR | DR | DR | Monroe |
| 1821–1823 | DR | DR | DR | Monroe |
| 1823–1825 | DR | DR | DR | Monroe |
| **1825–1827** | **D** | **DR** | **DR** | J.Q. Adams |
| **1827–1829** | **D** | **D** | **NR** (Note: During Adams's presidency, the Democratic-Republican Party splintered into two major camps: the National Republican Party, which supported Adams, and Andrew Jackson's Democratic Party.) | J.Q. Adams |
| 1829–1831 | D | D | D | Jackson |
| 1831–1833 | D (Note: Jacksonian control of the Senate was through plurality.) | D | D | Jackson |
| **1833–1835** | **NR** | **D** | **D** | Jackson |
| 1835–1837 | D | D | D | Jackson |
| 1837–1839 | D | D | D | Buren |
| 1839–1841 | D | D | D | Buren |
| 1841–1843 | W | W | W (Note: Whig president William Henry Harrison died April 4, 1841, one month into his term, and was succeeded by John Tyler, who served for the remainder of the term. Tyler had been elected as vice president on the Whig ticket, but he became an independent after the Whigs expelled him from the party on September 13, 1841.) | W. Harrison / Tyler |
| **1843–1845** | **W** | **D** | **I** | Tyler |
| 1845–1847 | D | D | D | Polk |
| **1847–1849** | **D** | **W** (Note: Whigs controlled the House through a plurality in the 2nd half of the 1st congressional session; for the remainder of the two sessions the Whigs controlled the House through a majority.) | **D** | Polk |
| **1849–1851** | **D** | **D** | **W** | Taylor / Fillmore |
| **1851–1853** | **D** | **D** | **W** | Fillmore |
| 1853–1855 | D | D | D | Pierce |
| **1855–1857** | **D** | **W** | **D** | Pierce |
| 1857–1859 | D | D | D | Buchanan |
| **1859–1861** | **D** | **R** | **D** | Buchanan |
| 1861–1863 | R | R | R | Lincoln |
| 1863–1865 | R | R | R | Lincoln |
| **1865–1867** | **R** | **R** | **D** | A. Johnson |
| **1867–1869** | **R** | **R** | **D** | A. Johnson |
| 1869–1871 | R | R | R | Grant |
| 1871–1873 | R | R | R | Grant |
| 1873–1875 | R | R | R | Grant |
| **1875–1877** | **R** | **D** | **R** | Grant |
| **1877–1879** | **R** | **D** | **R** | Hayes |
| **1879–1881** | **D** | **D** | **R** | Hayes |
| 1881–1883 | R (Note: The 1880-81 elections resulted in a 37-37 tie in the Senate, with 1 Readjuster and 1 Independent caucusing with the opposite parties. The Constitution gives tie-breaking power to the vice president, which was Republican Chester A. Arthur for part of the 47th Congress, then left vacant after his accession.) | R | R | Garfield / Arthur |
| **1883–1885** | **R** | **D** | **R** | Arthur |
| **1885–1887** | **R** | **D** | **D** | Cleveland |
| **1887–1889** | **R** | **D** | **D** | Cleveland |
| 1889–1891 | R | R | R | B. Harrison |
| **1891–1893** | **R** | **D** | **R** | B. Harrison |
| 1893–1895 | D | D | D | Cleveland (Note: Referring to their second, non-consecutive term as president) |
| **1895–1897** | **R** | **R** | **D** | Cleveland |
| 1897–1899 | R | R | R | McKinley |
| 1899–1901 | R | R | R | McKinley |
| 1901–1903 | R | R | R | McKinley / T. Roosevelt |
| 1903–1905 | R | R | R | T. Roosevelt |
| 1905–1907 | R | R | R | T. Roosevelt |
| 1907–1909 | R | R | R | T. Roosevelt |
| 1909–1911 | R | R | R | Taft |
| **1911–1913** | **R** | **D** | **R** | Taft |
| 1913–1915 | D | D | D | Wilson |
| 1915–1917 | D | D | D | Wilson |
| 1917–1919 | D | D (Note: The 1916 elections resulted in the Republican Party winning a plurality of seats, but the Democratic Party formed a coalition government with the Progressive Party and Socialist Party.) | D | Wilson |
| **1919–1921** | **R** | **R** | **D** | Wilson |
| 1921–1923 | R | R | R | Harding |
| 1923–1925 | R | R | R | Harding / Coolidge |
| 1925–1927 | R | R | R | Coolidge |
| 1927–1929 | R | R | R | Coolidge |
| 1929–1931 | R | R | R | Hoover |
| **1931–1933** | **R** | **D** | **R** | Hoover |
| 1933–1935 | D | D | D | F.D. Roosevelt |
| 1935–1937 | D | D | D | F.D. Roosevelt |
| 1937–1939 | D | D | D | F.D. Roosevelt |
| 1939–1941 | D | D | D | F.D. Roosevelt |
| 1941–1943 | D | D | D | F.D. Roosevelt |
| 1943–1945 | D | D | D | F.D. Roosevelt |
| 1945–1947 | D | D | D | F.D. Roosevelt / Truman |
| **1947–1949** | **R** | **R** | **D** | Truman |
| 1949–1951 | D | D | D | Truman |
| 1951–1953 | D | D | D | Truman |
| 1953–1955 | R (Note: The 1952 elections resulted in a 49-47 Republican majority, but Wayne Morse switched to become an independent, and vacancies resulted in a tied Senate for part of the Congress. The Constitution gives tie-breaking power to the vice president, which for most of the 83rd Congress was Republican Richard Nixon.) | R | R | Eisenhower |
| **1955–1957** | **D** | **D** | **R** | Eisenhower |
| **1957–1959** | **D** | **D** | **R** | Eisenhower |
| **1959–1961** | **D** | **D** | **R** | Eisenhower |
| 1961–1963 | D | D | D | Kennedy |
| 1963–1965 | D | D | D | Kennedy / L. Johnson |
| 1965–1967 | D | D | D | L. Johnson |
| 1967–1969 | D | D | D | L. Johnson |
| **1969–1971** | **D** | **D** | **R** | Nixon |
| **1971–1973** | **D** | **D** | **R** | Nixon |
| **1973–1975** | **D** | **D** | **R** | Nixon / Ford |
| **1975–1977** | **D** | **D** | **R** | Ford |
| 1977–1979 | D | D | D | Carter |
| 1979–1981 | D | D | D | Carter |
| **1981–1983** | **R** | **D** | **R** | Reagan |
| **1983–1985** | **R** | **D** | **R** | Reagan |
| **1985–1987** | **R** | **D** | **R** | Reagan |
| **1987–1989** | **D** | **D** | **R** | Reagan |
| **1989–1991** | **D** | **D** | **R** | G.H.W. Bush |
| **1991–1993** | **D** | **D** | **R** | G.H.W. Bush |
| 1993–1995 | D | D | D | Clinton |
| **1995–1997** | **R** | **R** | **D** | Clinton |
| **1997–1999** | **R** | **R** | **D** | Clinton |
| **1999–2001** | **R** | **R** | **D** | Clinton |
| **2001–2003** | **D** (Note: The 2000 elections resulted in a 50–50 tie in the Senate, and the Constitution gives tie-breaking power to the vice president. The vice president during most of the 107th Congress was Republican Dick Cheney. Then on May 24, 2001, Republican Senator Jim Jeffords of Vermont left the Republican Party to caucus with the Democrats as an independent, resulting in Democrats gaining the Senate majority.) | **R** | **R** | G.W. Bush |
| 2003–2005 | R | R | R | G.W. Bush |
| 2005–2007 | R | R | R | G.W. Bush |
| **2007–2009** | **D** | **D** | **R** | G.W. Bush |
| 2009–2011 | D | D | D | Obama |
| **2011–2013** | **D** | **R** | **D** | Obama |
| **2013–2015** | **D** | **R** | **D** | Obama |
| **2015–2017** | **R** | **R** | **D** | Obama |
| 2017–2019 | R | R | R | Trump |
| **2019–2021** | **R** | **D** | **R** | Trump |
| 2021–2023 | D (Note: The 2020 elections resulted in a 50–50 tie in the Senate, and the Constitution gives tie-breaking power to the vice president. The vice president during most of the 117th Congress was Democrat Kamala Harris. Biden also served the last 17 days of his presidency with a Republican majority Senate.) | D | D | Biden |
| **2023–2025** | **D** | **R** | **D** | Biden |
| 2025–2027 | R | R | R | Trump |
| **2027–2029** | **D** | **D** | **R** | Trump |
| Year | Senate | House | President party | President |

== Presidential impact ==
Many presidential elections produced what is known as a coattail effect, in which the success of a presidential candidate also leads to electoral success for other members of their party. In fact, all newly elected presidents except Zachary Taylor, Richard Nixon, and George H. W. Bush were accompanied by control of at least one house of Congress.

Conversely, midterm elections are regarded as a referendum on the sitting president, and their party typically loses seats in Congress.

== Presidents by congressional control and terms ==
Most columns are in numbers of years.

| No. | President | President's party | | Elections won | Years served | Senate with | Senate opposed | House with | House opposed | Congress with | Congress divided | Congress opposed |
|---|---|---|---|---|---|---|---|---|---|---|---|---|
| 1 | George Washington | None | | 2 | 8 | 8 | 0 | 4 | 4 | 4 | 4 | 0 |
| 2 | John Adams | Federalist | | 1 | 4 | 4 | 0 | 4 | 0 | 4 | 0 | 0 |
| 3 | Thomas Jefferson | Democratic-Republican | | 2 | 8 | 8 | 0 | 8 | 0 | 8 | 0 | 0 |
| 4 | James Madison | Democratic-Republican | | 2 | 8 | 8 | 0 | 8 | 0 | 8 | 0 | 0 |
| 5 | James Monroe | Democratic-Republican | | 2 | 8 | 8 | 0 | 8 | 0 | 8 | 0 | 0 |
| 6 | John Quincy Adams | Democratic-Republican | National-Republican | 1 | 4 | 0 | 4 | 2 | 2 | 0 | 2 | 2 |
| 7 | Andrew Jackson | Democratic | | 2 | 8 | 6 | 2 | 8 | 0 | 6 | 2 | 0 |
| 8 | Martin Van Buren | Democratic | | 1 | 4 | 4 | 0 | 4 | 0 | 4 | 0 | 0 |
| 9 | William Harrison | Whig | | 1 | 0.1 | 0.1 | 0 | 0.1 | 0 | 0.1 | 0 | 0 |
| 10 | John Tyler | Whig | Independent | 0 | 3.9 | 3.9 | 0 | 1.9 | 2 | 1.9 | 2 | 0 |
| 11 | James Polk | Democratic | | 1 | 4 | 4 | 0 | 2 | 2 | 2 | 2 | 0 |
| 12 | Zachary Taylor | Whig | | 1 | 1 | 0 | 1 | 0 | 1 | 0 | 0 | 1 |
| 13 | Millard Fillmore | Whig | | 0 | 3 | 0 | 3 | 0 | 3 | 0 | 0 | 3 |
| 14 | Franklin Pierce | Democratic | | 1 | 4 | 4 | 0 | 2 | 2 | 2 | 2 | 0 |
| 15 | James Buchanan | Democratic | | 1 | 4 | 4 | 0 | 2 | 2 | 2 | 2 | 0 |
| 16 | Abraham Lincoln | Republican | National Union | 2 | 4.1 | 4.1 | 0 | 4.1 | 0 | 4.1 | 0 | 0 |
| 17 | Andrew Johnson | National Union | Democratic | 0 | 3.9 | 0 | 3.9 | 0 | 3.9 | 0 | 0 | 3.9 |
| 18 | Ulysses Grant | Republican | | 2 | 8 | 8 | 0 | 6 | 2 | 6 | 2 | 0 |
| 19 | Rutherford Hayes | Republican | | 1 | 4 | 2 | 2 | 0 | 4 | 0 | 2 | 2 |
| 20 | James Garfield | Republican | | 1 | 0.5 | 0 | 0.5 | 0.5 | 0 | 0 | 0.5 | 0 |
| 21 | Chester Arthur | Republican | | 0 | 3.5 | 3.5 | 0 | 1.5 | 2 | 1.5 | 2 | 0 |
| 22 | Grover Cleveland | Democratic | | 1 | 4 | 0 | 4 | 4 | 0 | 0 | 4 | 0 |
| 23 | Benjamin Harrison | Republican | | 1 | 4 | 4 | 0 | 2 | 2 | 2 | 2 | 0 |
| 24 | Grover Cleveland | Democratic | | 1 | 4 | 2 | 2 | 2 | 2 | 2 | 0 | 2 |
| 25 | William McKinley | Republican | | 2 | 4.5 | 4.5 | 0 | 4.5 | 0 | 4.5 | 0 | 0 |
| 26 | Theodore Roosevelt | Republican | | 1 | 7.5 | 7.5 | 0 | 7.5 | 0 | 7.5 | 0 | 0 |
| 27 | William Taft | Republican | | 1 | 4 | 4 | 0 | 2 | 2 | 2 | 2 | 0 |
| 28 | Woodrow Wilson | Democratic | | 2 | 8 | 6 | 2 | 6 | 2 | 6 | 0 | 2 |
| 29 | Warren Harding | Republican | | 1 | 2.4 | 2.4 | 0 | 2.4 | 0 | 2.4 | 0 | 0 |
| 30 | Calvin Coolidge | Republican | | 1 | 5.6 | 5.6 | 0 | 5.6 | 0 | 5.6 | 0 | 0 |
| 31 | Herbert Hoover | Republican | | 1 | 4 | 4 | 0 | 2 | 2 | 2 | 2 | 0 |
| 32 | Franklin Roosevelt | Democratic | | 4 | 12.2 | 12.2 | 0 | 12.2 | 0 | 12.2 | 0 | 0 |
| 33 | Harry Truman | Democratic | | 1 | 7.8 | 5.8 | 2 | 5.8 | 2 | 5.8 | 0 | 2 |
| 34 | Dwight Eisenhower | Republican | | 2 | 8 | 2 | 6 | 2 | 6 | 2 | 0 | 6 |
| 35 | John Kennedy | Democratic | | 1 | 2.8 | 2.8 | 0 | 2.8 | 0 | 2.8 | 0 | 0 |
| 36 | Lyndon Johnson | Democratic | | 1 | 5.2 | 5.2 | 0 | 5.2 | 0 | 5.2 | 0 | 0 |
| 37 | Richard Nixon | Republican | | 2 | 5.6 | 0 | 5.6 | 0 | 5.6 | 0 | 0 | 5.6 |
| 38 | Gerald Ford | Republican | | 0 | 2.4 | 0 | 2.4 | 0 | 2.4 | 0 | 0 | 2.4 |
| 39 | Jimmy Carter | Democratic | | 1 | 4 | 4 (Note: Carter served the last 17 days of his presidency with a Republican majority Senate.) | 0 | 4 | 0 | 4 | 0 | 0 |
| 40 | Ronald Reagan | Republican | | 2 | 8 | 6 | 2 | 0 | 8 | 0 | 6 | 2 |
| 41 | George H. W. Bush | Republican | | 1 | 4 | 0 | 4 | 0 | 4 | 0 | 0 | 4 |
| 42 | Bill Clinton | Democratic | | 2 | 8 | 2 (Note: Clinton served the last 17 days of his 2nd term with a 50-50 majority in the senate, and the Constitution gives tie-breaking power to the vice president. During this brief period, Democrat Al Gore was the tie breaker until Republican Dick Cheney was sworn in and broke the tie in favor of the Republicans.) | 6 | 2 | 6 | 2 | 0 | 6 |
| 43 | George W. Bush | Republican | | 2 | 8 | 4.5 | 3.5 | 6 | 2 | 4.5 | 1.5 | 2 |
| 44 | Barack Obama | Democratic | | 2 | 8 | 6 | 2 | 2 | 6 | 2 | 4 | 2 |
| 45 | Donald Trump | Republican | | 1 | 4 | 4 | 0 | 2 | 2 | 2 | 2 | 0 |
| 46 | Joe Biden | Democratic | | 1 | 4 | 4 | 0 | 2 | 2 | 2 | 2 | 0 |
| 47 | Donald Trump | Republican | | 1 | 2 | 2 | 0 | 2 | 0 | 2 | 0 | 0 |
| No. | President | President's party | | Elections won | Years served | Senate with | Senate opposed | House with | House opposed | Congress with | Congress divided | Congress opposed |

== See also ==
- Divided government
- Government trifectas in the United States
- United States midterm election § Historical record of midterm
- Party divisions of United States Congresses
- Political party strength in U.S. states
- Gridlock (politics)
- Vetocracy, a system of governance where no single entity can acquire enough power to make decisions
