= Party divisions of United States Congresses =

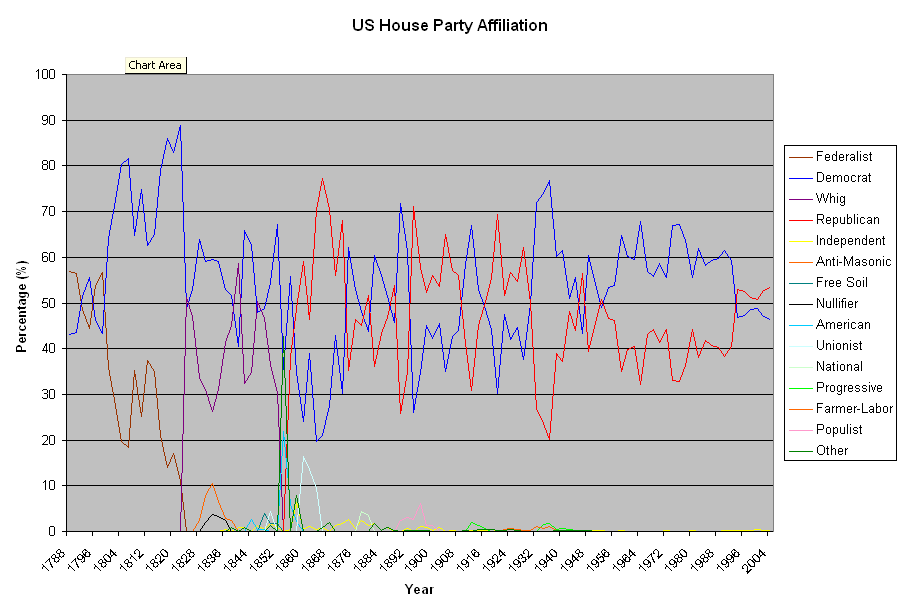
Balance of Parties in the United States House of Representatives over time

Party divisions of United States Congresses have played a central role on the organization and operations of both chambers of the United States Congress—the Senate and the House of Representatives—since its establishment as the bicameral legislature of the Federal government of the United States in 1789. Political parties had not been anticipated when the U.S. Constitution was drafted in 1787, nor did they exist at the time the first Senate elections and House elections occurred in 1788 and 1789. Organized political parties developed in the U.S. in the 1790s, but political factions—from which organized parties evolved—began to appear almost immediately after the 1st Congress convened. Those who supported the Washington administration were referred to as "pro-administration" and would eventually form the Federalist Party, while those in opposition joined the emerging Democratic-Republican Party.

== Party divisions by Congress ==
The following table lists the party divisions for each United States Congress. Note that numbers in boldface denote the majority party at that particular time while italicized numbers signify a Congress in which the majority party changed intra-term.

Congress	Years	Senate					House of Representatives					President	Trifecta
Congress	Years	Total	Anti- Admin	Pro- Admin	Others	Vacancies	Total	Anti- Admin	Pro- Admin	Others	Vacancies	President	Trifecta
1st	1789–1791	26	8	**18**	—	—	65	28	**37**	—	—	George Washington	Yes
2nd	1791–1793	30	13	**16**	—	1	69	30	**39**	—	—	George Washington	Yes
3rd	1793–1795	30	14	**16**	—	—	105	**54**	51	—	—	George Washington	No
Congress	Years	Total	Democratic- Republicans	Federalists	Others	Vacancies	Total	Democratic- Republicans	Federalists	Others	Vacancies	President	Trifecta
4th	1795–1797	32	11	**21**	—	—	106	**59**	47	—	—	George Washington	No
5th	1797–1799	32	10	**22**	—	—	106	49	**57**	—	—	John Adams	Yes
6th	1799–1801	32	10	**22**	—	—	106	46	**60**	—	—	John Adams	Yes
7th	1801–1803	34	**17**	15	—	2	107	**68**	38	—	1	Thomas Jefferson	No*/Yes
8th	1803–1805	34	**25**	9	—	—	142	**103**	39	—	—	Thomas Jefferson	Yes
9th	1805–1807	34	**27**	7	—	—	142	**114**	28	—	—	Thomas Jefferson	Yes
10th	1807–1809	34	**28**	6	—	—	142	**116**	26	—	—	Thomas Jefferson	Yes
11th	1809–1811	34	**27**	7	—	—	142	**92**	50	—	—	James Madison	Yes
12th	1811–1813	36	**30**	6	—	—	143	**107**	36	—	—	James Madison	Yes
13th	1813–1815	36	**28**	8	—	—	182	**114**	68	—	—	James Madison	Yes
14th	1815–1817	38	**26**	12	—	—	183	**119**	64	—	—	James Madison	Yes
15th	1817–1819	42	**30**	12	—	—	185	**146**	39	—	—	James Monroe	Yes
16th	1819–1821	46	**37**	9	—	—	186	**160**	26	—	—	James Monroe	Yes
17th	1821–1823	48	**44**	4	—	—	187	**155**	32	—	—	James Monroe	Yes
18th	1823–1825	48	**43**	5	—	—	213	**189**	24	—	—	James Monroe	Yes
Congress	Years	Total	Jacksonian	Anti-Jackson	Others	Vacancies	Total	Jacksonian	Anti-Jackson	Others	Vacancies	President	Trifecta
19th	1825–1827	48	**26**	22	—	—	213	104	**109**	—	—	John Quincy Adams	No
20th	1827–1829	48	**27**	21	—	—	213	**113**	100	—	—	John Quincy Adams	No
21st	1829–1831	48	**25**	23	—	—	213	**136**	72	5	—	Andrew Jackson	Yes
22nd	1831–1833	48	**24**	22	2	—	213	**126**	66	21	—	Andrew Jackson	Yes
23rd	1833–1835	48	20	**26**	2	—	240	**143**	63	34	—	Andrew Jackson	No
24th	1835–1837	52	**26**	24	2	—	242	**143**	75	24	—	Andrew Jackson	No/Yes
Congress	Years	Total	Democrats	Whigs	Others	Vacancies	Total	Democrats	Whigs	Others	Vacancies	President	Trifecta
25th	1837–1839	52	**35**	17	—	—	242	**128**	100	14	—	Martin Van Buren	Yes
26th	1839–1841	52	**30**	22	—	—	242	**125**	109	8	—	Martin Van Buren	Yes
27th	1841–1843	52	22	**29**	—	1	242	98	**142**	2	—	John Tyler	Yes/No
28th	1843–1845	52	23	**29**	—	—	223	**147**	72	4	—	John Tyler	No
29th	1845–1847	58	**34**	22	—	2	228	**142**	79	7	—	James K. Polk	Yes
30th	1847–1849	60	**38**	21	1	—	230	110	**116**	4	—	James K. Polk	No
31st	1849–1851	62	**35**	25	2	—	233	**113**	108	11	1	Zachary Taylor	No
32nd	1851–1853	62	**36**	23	3	—	233	**127**	85	21	—	Millard Fillmore	No
33rd	1853–1855	62	**38**	22	2	—	234	**157**	71	6	—	Franklin Pierce	Yes
Congress	Years	Total	Democrats	Opposition	Others	Vacancies	Total	Democrats	Opposition	Others	Vacancies	President	Trifecta
34th	1855–1857	62	**39**	21	2	—	234	83	**100**	51	—	Franklin Pierce	No
Congress	Years	Total	Democrats	Republicans	Others	Vacancies	Total	Democrats	Republicans	Others	Vacancies	President	Trifecta
35th	1857–1859	64	**39**	20	5	—	237	**131**	94	13	—	James Buchanan	Yes
36th	1859–1861	66	**38**	26	2	—	237	101	**113**	23	—	James Buchanan	No
37th	1861–1863	50	11	**31**	7	1	178	42	**106**	28	2	Abraham Lincoln	Yes
38th	1863–1865	51	12	**29**	—	—	183	80	**103**	—	—	Abraham Lincoln	Yes
39th	1865–1867	52	10	**42**	—	—	191	46	**145**	—	—	Andrew Johnson	Yes/No
40th	1867–1869	53	11	**42**	—	—	193	49	**143**	—	1	Andrew Johnson	No
41st	1869–1871	74	11	**61**	—	2	243	73	**170**	—	—	Ulysses S. Grant	Yes
42nd	1871–1873	74	17	**57**	—	—	243	104	**136**	3	—	Ulysses S. Grant	Yes
43rd	1873–1875	74	19	**54**	—	1	293	88	**203**	—	2	Ulysses S. Grant	Yes
44th	1875–1877	76	29	**46**	—	1	293	**181**	107	3	2	Ulysses S. Grant	No
45th	1877–1879	76	36	**39**	1	—	293	**156**	137	—	—	Rutherford B. Hayes	No
46th	1879–1881	76	**43**	33	—	—	293	**150**	128	14	1	Rutherford B. Hayes	No
47th	1881–1883	76	37	37	2	—	293	130	**152**	11	—	Chester A. Arthur	Yes/No
48th	1883–1885	76	36	**40**	—	—	325	**200**	119	6	—	Chester A. Arthur	No
49th	1885–1887	76	34	**41**	—	1	325	**182**	140	2	1	Grover Cleveland	No
50th	1887–1889	76	37	**39**	—	—	325	**170**	151	4	—	Grover Cleveland	No
51st	1889–1891	84	37	**47**	—	—	330	156	**173**	1	—	Benjamin Harrison	Yes
52nd	1891–1893	88	39	**47**	2	—	333	**231**	88	14	—	Benjamin Harrison	No
53rd	1893–1895	88	**44**	38	3	3	356	**220**	126	10	—	Grover Cleveland	Yes
54th	1895–1897	88	39	**44**	5	—	357	104	**246**	7	—	Grover Cleveland	No
55th	1897–1899	90	34	**46**	10	—	357	134	**206**	16	1	William McKinley	Yes
56th	1899–1901	90	26	**53**	11	—	357	163	**185**	9	—	William McKinley	Yes
57th	1901–1903	90	29	**56**	3	2	357	153	**198**	5	1	Theodore Roosevelt	Yes
58th	1903–1905	90	32	**58**	—	—	386	178	**207**	—	1	Theodore Roosevelt	Yes
59th	1905–1907	90	32	**58**	—	—	386	136	**250**	—	—	Theodore Roosevelt	Yes
60th	1907–1909	92	29	**61**	—	2	386	164	**222**	—	—	Theodore Roosevelt	Yes
61st	1909–1911	92	32	**59**	—	1	391	172	**219**	—	—	William H. Taft	Yes
62nd	1911–1913	92	42	**49**	—	1	391	**228**	162	1	—	William H. Taft	Yes
63rd	1913–1915	96	**51**	44	1	—	435	**290**	127	18	—	Woodrow Wilson	Yes
64th	1915–1917	96	**56**	39	1	—	435	**231**	193	8	3	Woodrow Wilson	Yes
65th	1917–1919	96	**53**	42	1	—	435	**210**	216	**9**	—	Woodrow Wilson	Yes
66th	1919–1921	96	47	**49**	—	—	435	191	**237**	7	—	Woodrow Wilson	No
67th	1921–1923	96	37	**59**	—	—	435	132	**300**	1	2	Warren G. Harding	Yes
68th	1923–1925	96	43	**51**	2	—	435	207	**225**	3	—	Calvin Coolidge	Yes
69th	1925–1927	96	40	**54**	1	1	435	183	**247**	5	—	Calvin Coolidge	Yes
70th	1927–1929	96	47	**48**	1	—	435	195	**237**	3	—	Calvin Coolidge	Yes
71st	1929–1931	96	39	**56**	1	—	435	163	**267**	1	4	Herbert Hoover	Yes
72nd	1931–1933	96	47	**48**	1	—	435	**217**	217	**1**	—	Herbert Hoover	No
73rd	1933–1935	96	**59**	36	1	—	435	**313**	117	5	—	Franklin D. Roosevelt	Yes
74th	1935–1937	96	**69**	25	2	—	435	**322**	103	10	—	Franklin D. Roosevelt	Yes
75th	1937–1939	96	**76**	16	4	—	435	**333**	89	13	—	Franklin D. Roosevelt	Yes
76th	1939–1941	96	**69**	23	4	—	435	**261**	169	5	—	Franklin D. Roosevelt	Yes
77th	1941–1943	96	**66**	28	2	—	435	**268**	162	5	—	Franklin D. Roosevelt	Yes
78th	1943–1945	96	**57**	38	1	—	435	**222**	209	4	—	Franklin D. Roosevelt	Yes
79th	1945–1947	96	**57**	38	1	—	435	**243**	190	2	—	Harry S. Truman	Yes
80th	1947–1949	96	45	**51**	—	—	435	188	**246**	1	—	Harry S. Truman	No
81st	1949–1951	96	**54**	42	—	—	435	**262**	171	2	—	Harry S. Truman	Yes
82nd	1951–1953	96	**48**	47	1	—	435	**235**	199	1	—	Harry S. Truman	Yes
83rd	1953–1955	96	47	**48**	1	—	435	213	**221**	1	—	Dwight D. Eisenhower	Yes
84th	1955–1957	96	**48**	47	1	—	435	**232**	203	—	—	Dwight D. Eisenhower	No
85th	1957–1959	96	**49**	47	—	—	435	**234**	201	—	—	Dwight D. Eisenhower	No
86th	1959–1961	98	**64**	34	—	—	437	**284**	153	—	—	Dwight D. Eisenhower	No
87th	1961–1963	100	**64**	36	—	—	437	**262**	175	—	—	John F. Kennedy	Yes
88th	1963–1965	100	**67**	33	—	—	435	**258**	176	—	1	Lyndon B. Johnson	Yes
89th	1965–1967	100	**68**	32	—	—	435	**295**	140	—	—	Lyndon B. Johnson	Yes
90th	1967–1969	100	**64**	36	—	—	435	**247**	187	—	1	Lyndon B. Johnson	Yes
91st	1969–1971	100	**58**	42	—	—	435	**243**	192	—	—	Richard Nixon	No
92nd	1971–1973	100	**54**	44	2	—	435	**255**	180	—	—	Richard Nixon	No
93rd	1973–1975	100	**56**	42	2	—	435	**243**	192	—	—	Gerald Ford	No
94th	1975–1977	100	**61**	37	2	—	435	**291**	144	—	—	Gerald Ford	No
95th	1977–1979	100	**61**	38	1	—	435	**292**	143	—	—	Jimmy Carter	Yes
96th	1979–1981	100	**58**	41	1	—	435	**277**	157	1	—	Jimmy Carter	Yes
97th	1981–1983	100	46	**53**	1	—	435	**242**	192	1	—	Ronald Reagan	No
98th	1983–1985	100	46/45	**54/55**	—	—	435	**269**	165	1	—	Ronald Reagan	No
99th	1985–1987	100	47	**53**	—	—	435	**253**	181	1	—	Ronald Reagan	No
100th	1987–1989	100	**55**	45	—	—	435	**258**	177	—	—	Ronald Reagan	No
101st	1989–1991	100	**55**	45	—	—	435	**260**	175	—	—	George H. W. Bush	No
102nd	1991–1993	100	**56**	44	—	—	435	**267**	167	1	—	George H. W. Bush	No
103rd	1993–1995	100	**57**	43	—	—	435	**258**	176	1	—	Bill Clinton	Yes
104th	1995–1997	100	47	**53**	—	—	435	204	**230**	1	—	Bill Clinton	No
105th	1997–1999	100	45	**55**	—	—	435	206	**227**	2	—	Bill Clinton	No
106th	1999–2001	100	45	**55**	—	—	435	211	**223**	1	—	Bill Clinton	No
107th	2001–2003	100	**50**	**50**/49	0/**1**	—	435	212	**221**	2	—	George W. Bush	Yes/No
108th	2003–2005	100	48	**51**	1	—	435	205	**229**	1	—	George W. Bush	Yes
109th	2005–2007	100	44	**55**	1	—	435	202	**232**	1	—	George W. Bush	Yes
110th	2007–2009	100	**49**	49	**2**	—	435	**233**	202	—	—	George W. Bush	No
111th	2009–2011	100	**56–58**	40–42	**2**	—	435	**257**	178	—	—	Barack Obama	Yes
112th	2011–2013	100	**51**	47	**2**	—	435	193	**242**	—	—	Barack Obama	No
113th	2013–2015	100	**53**	45	**2**	—	435	201	**234**	—	—	Barack Obama	No
114th	2015–2017	100	44	**54**	2	—	435	188	**247**	—	—	Barack Obama	No
115th	2017–2019	100	46/47	**50–52**	2	—	435	194	**241**	—	—	Donald Trump	Yes
116th	2019–2021	100	45/46	**53/52**	2	—	435	**235**	200/199	1	—	Donald Trump	No
117th	2021–2023	100	**46–48**	**51**/50	**2/3**	—	435	**222**	213	—	—	Joe Biden	Yes
118th	2023–2025	100	**47/48**	49	**3/4**	—	435	212/213	**222/220**	—	2/1	Joe Biden	No
119th	2025–2027	100	45	**53/52**	2	1	435	215	**219**	—	1	Donald Trump	Yes
Congress	Years	Total	Democrats	Republicans	Others	Vacancies	Total	Democrats	Republicans	Others	Vacancies	President	Trifecta
Congress	Years	Senate					House of Representatives					President	Trifecta

== Partisan control of Congress ==
This table shows the number of Congresses in which a party controlled either the House, the Senate, or the presidency.

Party	Senate	House	Presidency	Trifecta
Democratic	51	59	45	30
Republican	43	36	46	22
Democratic- Republican	12	13	14	12
Federalist	3	2	2	2
Pro- Administration	3	2	0	2
Whig	2	2	2	0
National; Republican	1	1	0	0
Anti- Administration	0	1	0	0
Opposition	0	1	0	0
National; Union	0	0	2	0
Split control	2	0	1	49
Independent	0	0	5	

== See also ==
- Divided government in the United States
- Political party strength in U.S. states
