= Ford Dorsey Master's in International Policy =

Graduate program of Stanford University

- Type: Private; Postgraduate
- Established: 1982
- Parent institution: Stanford University
- Affiliations: APSIA
- Director: Francis Fukuyama
- Students: ~50
- Location: Stanford, CA, United States
- Website: Official website

The Ford Dorsey Master's in International Policy (MIP) at Stanford University is a two-year graduate program granting the Master of Arts degree. Housed within Stanford's Freeman Spogli Institute for International Studies, MIP is a multidisciplinary program dedicated to the study and analysis of international affairs. The current director of MIP is Francis Fukuyama, also the Olivier Nomellini Senior Fellow at the Freeman Spogli Institute for International Studies. Dr. Chonira Aturupane is the associate director of academic and student affairs.

== History ==
MIP was established as a one-year master's program in 1982. Following a $7.5 million gift from philanthropist Susan Ford Dorsey in 2007, the program was renamed the Ford Dorsey Program in International Policy Studies (IPS), and was housed within Stanford's Global Studies Division. The gift coincided with IPS becoming a two-year program, as well as the introduction of a practicum as a capstone to the program.

In 2018, the program was redesigned and renamed the Ford Dorsey Master's in International Policy (MIP), now housed within Stanford's Freeman Spogli Institute for International Studies. This change reflects a restructuring of the program beyond policy analysis, toward evidence-based policymaking and achieving policy change in the real world.

== Student body ==
The Ford Dorsey Master's in International Policy sees an incoming class of 20 to 30 students. About 42% of the class comes from abroad.

== Curriculum ==
The program offers the following degrees: MA in international policy, joint degrees with the Stanford Law School (JD/MA) or Public Policy Program (MPP/MA), and a dual degree as part of a three-year program with the Stanford Graduate School of Business (MBA/MA).

The interdisciplinary program combines a scholarly focus with practical training to prepare students for careers in public service working on international issues. It is geared toward analysis of international policy issues in diplomacy, governance, cyber security, global health, and environmental policy, and also offers research opportunities.

In addition to core course requirements, each student is expected to specialize in one of five areas of concentration:

- Cyber Policy and Security
- Energy, Natural Resources, and the Environment
- Global Health
- Governance and Development
- International Security

During the second year of the program, students are required to enroll in the practicum course for two quarters. Students choose elective courses related at least broadly to international policy.

There is also an exchange program between MIP and the Diplomatic Academy of Vienna. Every year, two second-year students from each institution receive fellowships to study for a quarter at the other institution.

== Faculty ==
Students are taught and mentored by faculty from the Freeman Spogli Institute for International Studies. Notable affiliated faculty includes former Secretary of State Condoleezza Rice, former Secretary of Defense William Perry, former United States Ambassador to Russia Michael McFaul, former United States Ambassador to Afghanistan Karl Eikenberry, Francis Fukuyama, Larry Diamond, Amy Zegart, Michael Armacost, and Coit Blacker. Former Facebook chief security officer Alex Stamos is an adjunct professor and William J. Perry Fellow, and Brett McGurk, the former U.S. Special Presidential Envoy for the Global Coalition to Counter ISIL, is the Payne Distinguished Lecturer.

== Internships ==
There is a summer internship program for students between their first and second years, to work with organizations that focus on international policy issues. MIP students have completed internships at institutions including the World Bank, United Nations, Cologne Institute for Economic Research, and the National Oceanic & Atmospheric Administration.

== Policy Change Studio ==
As a capstone to the MIP degree, second-year students complete a two-quarter course called Policy Change Studio, in which students work in teams to address pressing global policy issues for organizations. Past organizations include the Department of State, Millennium Challenge Corporation, Sandia National Labs, Asia Foundation, and the Defense Intelligence Agency.

== See also ==
- John F. Kennedy School of Government at Harvard University
- Woodrow Wilson School of Public and International Affairs at Princeton University
- School of International and Public Affairs at Columbia University
- Heinz College at Carnegie Mellon University
- Harris School of Public Policy Studies at the University of Chicago
- Gerald R. Ford School of Public Policy at the University of Michigan
- School of Global Policy and Strategy at the University of California San Diego
