= Yoshihiro =

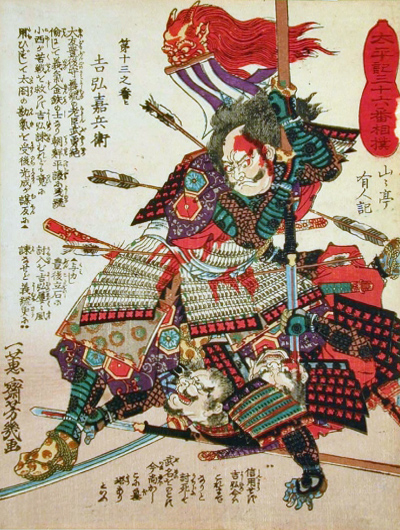
- Yoshihiro Kahei (1563–1600), Japanese samurai
- Pronunciation: joɕiçiɾo (IPA)
- Gender: Male

Origin
- Origin: Japanese
- Meaning: Different meanings depending on the kanji used

Other names
- Alternative spelling: Yosihiro (Kunrei-shiki) Yosihiro (Nihon-shiki) Yoshihiro (Hepburn)

Yoshihiro is a masculine Japanese given name, and less commonly, a surname. There are dozens of different ways to write the name in kanji.

== Some examples of written forms ==
- 義弘, "justice, vast"
- 義広, "justice, wide"
- 義寛, "justice, generosity"
- 吉弘, "good luck, vast"
- 吉広, "good luck, wide"
- 吉博, "good luck, doctor"
- 善弘, "virtuous, vast"
- 善大, "virtuous, big"
- 善博, "virtuous, doctor"
- 善裕, "virtuous, abundant"
- 芳弘, "virtuous/fragrant, vast"
- 芳広, "virtuous/fragrant, wide"
- 芳博, "virtuous/fragrant, doctor"
- 良弘, "good, vast"
- 良広, "good, wide"
- 良博, "good, doctor"
- 慶弘, "congratulate, vast"

The name can also be written in hiragana よしひろ or katakana ヨシヒロ.

== Given name ==
Notable people with the given name Yoshihiro are listed below. Names are written below in Japanese (except for people for whom the kanji used to write their name are not known) with the family name first, followed by a space and the given name.

=== Daimyō and samurai ===
Note: people in this section have their names written with the surname first.

- Matsumae Yoshihiro (松前 慶広; 1548–1616), Japanese samurai
- Ōuchi Yoshihiro (大内 義興; 1356–1399), daimyō
- Satomi Yoshihiro (里見 義弘; 1530–1578), samurai
- Shimazu Yoshihiro (島津 義弘; 1535–1619), seventeenth head of the Shimazu clan
- Yoshihiro Muneyuki (吉弘 統幸, 1563–1600), aka Yoshihiro Kahei (吉弘 嘉兵衛), samurai

=== Sports ===
==== Baseball ====
- Yoshihiro Doi (土肥 義弘; born 1976), Japanese baseball pitcher (Nippon Professional Baseball)
- Yoshihiro Ito (baseball) (伊藤 義弘; 1982–2025), Japanese baseball pitcher (Nippon Professional Baseball)
- Yoshihiro Maru (丸 佳浩; born 1989), Japanese baseball player (Nippon Professional Baseball)
- Yoshihiro Suzuki (鈴木 義広; born 1983) is a Japanese baseball pitcher (Nippon Professional Baseball)

==== Football ====
- Yoshihiro Nakano (中野 嘉大; born 1993), Japanese football player
- Yoshihiro Natsuka (名塚 善寛; born 1969), Japanese football player
- Yoshihiro Nishida (西田 吉洋; born 1973), Japanese football player
- Yoshihiro Shoji (庄司 悦大; born 1989), Japanese football player
- Yoshihiro Uchimura (内村 圭宏; born 1985), Japanese football player

==== Professional wrestling ====
- Yoshihiro Asai (浅井 嘉浩; born 1966), Japanese professional wrestler
- Yoshihiro Momota (百田 義浩; 1946–2000), Japanese professional wrestler
- Yoshihiro Tajiri (田尻 義博; born 1970), Japanese professional wrestler
- Yoshihiro Takayama (高山 善廣; 21st century), Japanese professional wrestler and mixed martial arts fighter

==== Other ====
- Yoshihiro Akiyama (秋山 成勲; born 1975), Japanese judoka
- Yoshihiro Azuma (東 佳弘; born 1991), Japanese sprinter
- Yoshihiro Fujita (wrestler) (藤田 芳弘; born 1952), Japanese Greco-Roman wrestler
- Yoshihiro Fujita (fighter) (born 1969), Japanese mixed martial artist
- Yoshihiro Hamaguchi (浜口 喜博; 1926–2011), Japanese freestyle swimmer
- Yoshihiro Horigome (堀籠 佳宏; born 1981), Japanese sprinter
- Yoshihiro Ito (racing driver) (born 1977), Japanese racing driver
- Yoshihiro Kitazawa (北沢 欣浩; born 1962), Japanese speed skater
- Yoshihiro Miyazaki (宮崎 宣宏; born 1930), Japanese ice hockey player
- Yoshihiro Murakami (村上 佳宏; born 1976), Japanese modern pentathlete
- Yoshihiro Nakao (中尾 芳広; born 1972) Japanese mixed martial artist
- Yoshihiro Okumura (swimmer) (奥村 幸大; born 1983), Japanese swimmer
- Yoshihiro Onishi (大西 恵弘; 1941–2003), Japanese rower
- Yoshihiro Saito (斉藤 良宏; born 1976), Japanese gymnast
- Yoshihiro Sato (佐藤 嘉洋; born 1981), Japanese professional kickboxer and martial artist
- Yoshihiro Shiga (志賀 良弘; born 1956), Japanese handball player
- Yoshihiro Tsumuraya (born 1964), Japanese cyclist
- Yoshihiro Yasumi (born 1949), Japanese water polo player

=== Politics ===
- Yoshihiro Katayama (片山 善博; born 1951), Japanese politician, Minister of Internal Affairs and Communications (2010)
- Yoshihiro Kawakami (川上 義博; born 1950), Japanese politician with the Democratic Party of Japan
- Yoshihiro Kawano (河野 義博; born 1977), Japanese politician with Kōmeitō
- Yoshihiro Murai (村井 嘉浩; born 1960), Japanese politician with the Liberal Democratic Party, governor of Miyagi Prefecture
- Yoshihiro Seki (関 芳弘; born 1965), Japanese politician with the Liberal Democratic Party
- Yoshihiro Tokugawa (徳川 義寛; 1906–1996), Japanese political figure

=== Visual arts ===
- Yoshihiro Fukagawa (深川 栄洋; born 1976), Japanese film director
- Yoshihiro Nakamura (中村 義洋; fl. 21st century), Japanese film director
- Yoshihiro Nishimura (西村 喜廣; born 1967), Japanese film director
- Yoshihiro Takahashi (高橋 義廣; fl. 21st century), Japanese manga artist
- Yoshihiro Tatsuki (立木 義浩; 1935–2015), Japanese photographer
- Yoshihiro Tatsumi (fl. 21st century), Japanese manga artist
- Yoshihiro Togashi (冨樫 義博; born 1966), Japanese manga artist

=== Other ===
- Yoshihiro Francis Fukuyama (born 1952), American philosopher, political economist, and author
- Yoshihiro Hattori (服部 剛丈; 1975–1992), Japanese exchange student who was killed in the United States
- Yoshihiro Inoue (井上嘉浩; 1969–2018), Japanese terrorist and Aum Shinrikyo member who was executed
- Yoshihiro Kawaoka (河岡 義裕; born 1955), Japanese virologist, professor at the University of Wisconsin-Madison and the University of Tokyo
- Yoshihiro Narisawa (成澤 由浩; born 1969), Japanese chef
- Yoshihiro Tsurumi (霍見 芳浩; born 1935), Japanese economist, professor of international business at Baruch College of the City University of New York
- Yoshihiro Yasuda (安田 好弘; born 1948), Japanese lawyer and anti-death penalty activist
- Yoshihiro Yonezawa (米澤 嘉博; 1953–2006), Japanese manga critic

== Surname ==
- Mitsuyuki Yoshihiro (吉弘 充志; born 1985), Japanese football player
- Yoshihiro Kikuhime
