= Francis Fukuyama =

American political scientist, economist, and author (born 1952)

- Fukuyama in 2026
- Born: Francis Yoshihiro Fukuyama; October 27, 1952 (age 73); Chicago, Illinois, U.S.
- Spouse: Laura Holmgren
- Children: 3

Education
- Education: Cornell University (BA); Harvard University (MA, PhD)
- Thesis: Soviet Threats to Intervene in the Middle East, 1956–1973: A Study of Soviet Risk-Taking
- Doctoral advisors: Samuel P. Huntington

Philosophical work
- Era: 20th-century philosophy
- Region: Western philosophy
- School: Neoconservatism (early); Wilsonianism (later)
- Institutions: George Mason University; Johns Hopkins University; Stanford University
- Main interests: Developing nations; Governance; International political economy; Nation-building and democratization; Strategic and security issues
- Notable ideas: End of history Isothymia and Megalothymia; Vetocracy; Repatrimonialization
- Website: Official website

Francis Yoshihiro Fukuyama (/ˌfuːkuːˈjɑːmə/; born October 27, 1952) is an American political scientist, political economist, and international relations scholar. He is best known for his book The End of History and the Last Man (1992), which controversially argued that the worldwide spread of liberal democracies and Western free-market capitalism may represent the final step in humanity's sociocultural evolution and political struggle and the final form of human government.

Fukuyama has been a senior fellow at the Freeman Spogli Institute for International Studies since July 2010 and the Mosbacher Director of the Center on Democracy, Development and the Rule of Law at Stanford University. In August 2019, he was named director of the Ford Dorsey Master's in International Policy at Stanford. Previously, he served as a professor and director of the International Development program at the School of Advanced International Studies of Johns Hopkins University. Additionally, he had also been the Omer L. and Nancy Hirst Professor of Public Policy at the School of Public Policy at George Mason University.

Fukuyama serves as a council member of the International Forum for Democratic Studies, founded by the National Endowment for Democracy and was a member of the Political Science Department of the RAND Corporation. He is also one of the 25 leading figures on the Information and Democracy Commission launched by Reporters Without Borders.

== Early life and education ==
Francis Fukuyama was born in the Hyde Park neighborhood of Chicago, Illinois, United States. His paternal grandfather fled the Russo-Japanese War in 1905 and started a shop on the west coast before being incarcerated during World War II. His father, Yoshio Fukuyama, a second-generation Japanese American, was trained as a minister in the Congregational Church, received a doctorate in sociology from the University of Chicago, and taught religious studies. His mother, Toshiko Kawata Fukuyama (河田敏子), was born in Kyoto, Japan, and was the daughter of Shiro Kawata, founder of the Economics Department of Kyoto University and first president of Osaka City University. Francis, whose Japanese name is Yoshihiro, grew up in Manhattan as an only child, had little contact with Japanese culture, and did not learn Japanese. In 1967, his family moved to State College, Pennsylvania.

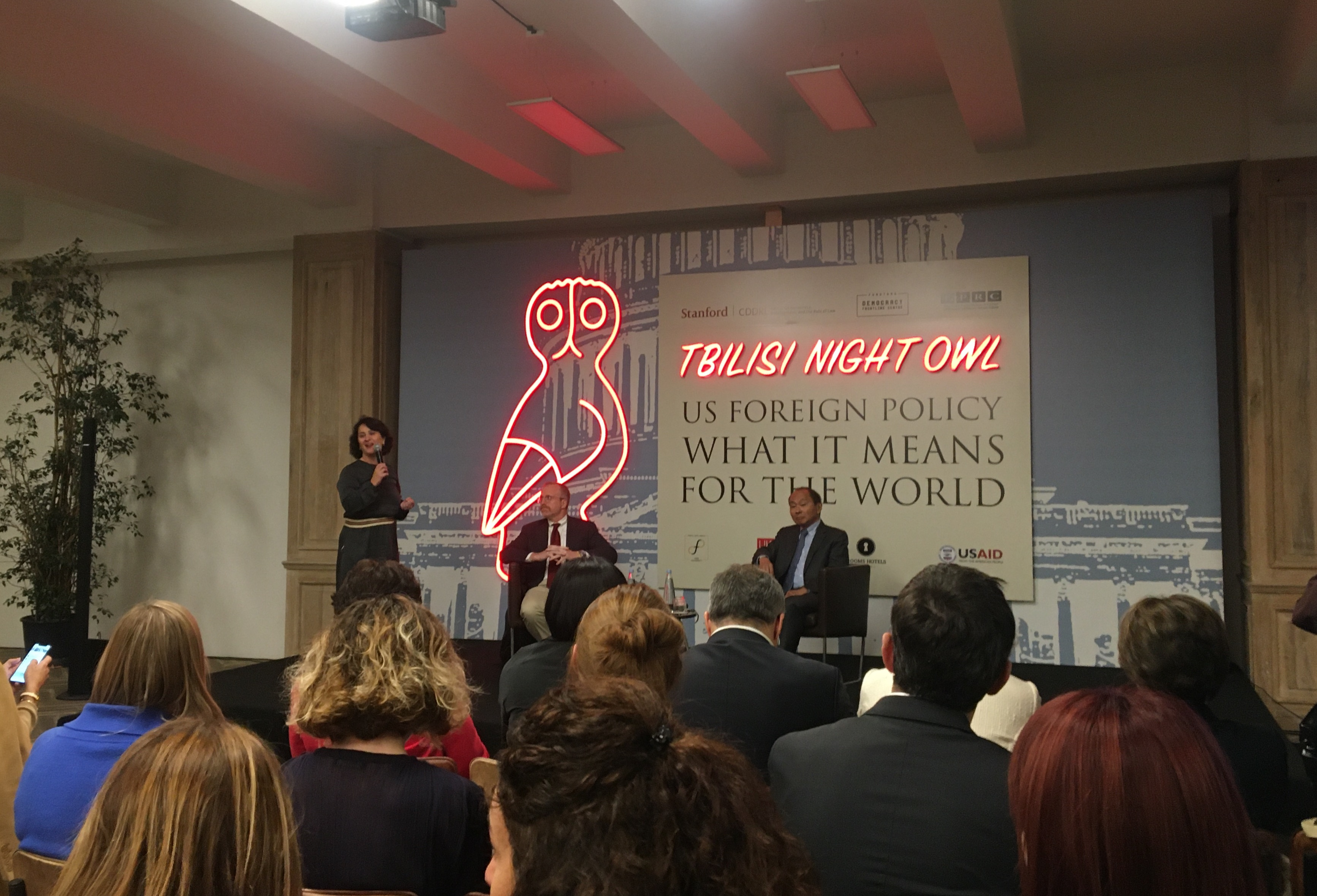
Francis Fukuyama participating in a night owl session in Tbilisi, Georgia

Fukuyama received his Bachelor of Arts degree in classics from Cornell University, where he studied political philosophy under Allan Bloom. While studying classics and political philosophy at Cornell, Fukuyama lived at Telluride House, an intellectually selective, self-governing scholarship society, of which Bloom was a faculty member. Following graduation from Cornell, Fukuyama initially pursued graduate studies in comparative literature at Yale University, going to Paris for six months to study under Roland Barthes and Jacques Derrida; however, he became disillusioned and switched to political science at Harvard University. There, he studied with Samuel P. Huntington and Harvey Mansfield, among others. He earned his Ph.D. in political science from Harvard for his thesis on Soviet threats to intervene in the Middle East. In 1979, he joined RAND Corporation, the global policy think tank.

Fukuyama was the Omer L. and Nancy Hirst Professor of Public Policy in the School of Public Policy at George Mason University from 1996 to 2000. Until July 10, 2010, he was the Bernard L. Schwartz Professor of International Political Economy and Director of the International Development Program at the Paul H. Nitze School of Advanced International Studies of Johns Hopkins University in Washington, D.C. He is now Olivier Nomellini Senior Fellow and resident in the Center on Democracy, Development, and the Rule of Law at the Freeman Spogli Institute for International Studies at Stanford University, and director of the Ford Dorsey Master's in International Policy at Stanford.

== Scholarship ==
=== The End of History and the Last Man ===
Fukuyama is best known as the author of The End of History and the Last Man, in which he argued that the progression of human history as a struggle between ideologies was largely at an end, with the world settling on liberal democracy after the end of the Cold War and the fall of the Berlin Wall in 1989. The book was an expansion on ideas expressed in an earlier article, "The End of History?" published in The National Interest. In the article, Fukuyama predicted the coming global triumph of political and economic liberalism:

What we may be witnessing is not just the end of the Cold War, or the passing of a particular period of postwar history, but the end of history as such: that is, the end point of mankind's ideological evolution and the universalization of Western liberal democracy as the final form of human government.

— Francis Fukuyama, 'The End of History?', The National Interest, No. 16 (Summer 1989)

Authors such as Ralf Dahrendorf and Luciano Canfora argued in 1990 that the essay gave Fukuyama his 15 minutes of fame, which a slide into obscurity would soon follow. However, Fukuyama remained a relevant and cited public intellectual, which led American communitarian Amitai Etzioni to declare him "one of the few enduring public intellectuals. They are often media stars who are eaten up and spat out after their 15 minutes. But he has lasted." Bernard Crick in his book titled Democracy spoke of Fukuyama's principle of "the end of the world" as being a poor misreading of the historical processes involved in the development of modern democracy.

According to Fukuyama, one of the main critiques of The End of History was of his aggressive stance against postmodernism. In Fukuyama's opinion, postmodern philosophy undermined the ideology behind liberal democracy, leaving the Western world in a potentially weaker position. The fact that Marxism and fascism had proven untenable for practical use while liberal democracy still thrived was reason enough to embrace the hopeful attitude of the Progressive Era, as this hope for the future was what made a society worth struggling to maintain. Postmodernism, which, by this time, had become embedded in the cultural consciousness, offered no hope and nothing to sustain a necessary sense of community, instead relying only on lofty intellectual premises.

=== The Origins of Political Order ===
In the 2011 book, Fukuyama describes what makes a state stable, using comparative political history to develop a theory of the stability of a political system. According to Fukuyama, an ideal political order needs a modern and effective state, the rule of law governing the state, and accountability.

=== Political Order and Political Decay ===
The 2014 book is his second work on political order, following the 2011 book The Origins of Political Order. In this book, Fukuyama covers events since the French Revolution and sheds light on political institutions and their development in different regions.

After tracing the development of a modern and effective government in the United States, Fukuyama asserts that the country is experiencing political decay. Fukuyama believes that political decay can be observed in the deterioration of bureaucracies, special interest groups capturing the legislature, and inevitable but cumbersome judicial processes challenging all types of government action.

=== Other works ===
Fukuyama has written a number of other books, among them Trust: The Social Virtues and the Creation of Prosperity and Our Posthuman Future: Consequences of the Biotechnology Revolution. In the latter, he qualified his original "end of history" thesis, arguing that since biotechnology increasingly allows humans to control their own evolution, it may allow humans to alter human nature, thereby putting liberal democracy at risk. One possible outcome could be that an altered human nature could end in radical inequality. He is a fierce enemy of transhumanism, an intellectual movement asserting that posthumanity is a desirable goal.

In another work, The Great Disruption: Human Nature and the Reconstruction of Social Order, Fukuyama explores the origins of social norms and analyzes current disruptions in the fabric of human moral traditions. He considers these disruptions to arise from a shift from the manufacturing to the Information Age. This shift is, he thinks, normal and will prove self-correcting, given the intrinsic human need for social norms and rules.

In 2006, in America at the Crossroads, Fukuyama discusses the history of neoconservatism, with particular focus on its major tenets and political implications. He outlines his rationale for supporting the Bush Administration and where he believed it was going wrong at the time.

In 2008, Fukuyama published the book Falling Behind: Explaining the Development Gap Between Latin America and the United States, which resulted from research and a conference funded by Grupo Mayan to gain an understanding of why Latin America, once far wealthier than North America, fell behind in terms of development in only a matter of centuries. Discussing this book at a 2009 conference, Fukuyama outlined his belief that inequality within Latin American nations impedes growth. He stated that an unequal distribution of wealth leads to social upheaval, resulting in stunted growth.

In 2018, in Identity: The Demand for Dignity and the Politics of Resentment, Fukuyama enlists Plato's notion of thymos to understand the politics of grievance and resentment. Fukuyama contends that human beings seek recognition of their dignity, and this need forms the psychological foundation of modern identity politics- the need for others to recognize one's moral and social worth, a need that has intensified in the modern era. The politics of dignity encompasses both liberal efforts to remedy the exclusion of minorities and authoritarian promises to restore the dignity of a supposedly disrespected majority. He argues that when dignity becomes tied to narrower identities—ethnic, religious, or national—it can be weaponized by strongmen who claim to speak for a humiliated people. Yet the same drive can also advance democratic aims when it pushes societies to acknowledge marginalized voices and expand equal rights. In this sense, the dynamic of dignity-seeking unifies otherwise opposing political movements.

At the start of the following decade, he published some reflections on his work in the form of conversations under the title After the End of History.

In 2022, Fukuyama published the book Liberalism and Its Discontents, in which he defended liberalism from critics on the populist right and the progressive left. He also criticized neoliberalism and identity politics.

Based on his published book Liberalism and Its Discontents, he wrote the article A Country of Their Own: Liberalism Needs the Nation, which was published in Foreign Affairs in April 2022. The article argues that liberalism globally is in crisis, and it must be combined with a strong and inclusive national identity in order to survive the current threats from authoritarianism and nationalist movements worldwide.

In 2026, Fukuyama published In the Realm of the Last Man: A Memoir, a reflection on his career as an academic and on the reception and impact of his work.

== Political views ==
=== Neoconservatism ===
As a key Reagan Administration contributor to the formulation of the Reagan Doctrine, Fukuyama is an important figure in the rise of neoconservatism, although his works came out years after Irving Kristol's 1972 book crystallized neoconservatism. Fukuyama was active in the Project for the New American Century think tank starting in 1997, and as a member co-signed the organization's 1998 letter recommending that President Bill Clinton support Iraqi insurgencies in the overthrow of then-President of Iraq Saddam Hussein. He was also among forty co-signers of William Kristol's September 20, 2001 letter to President George W. Bush after the September 11, 2001 attacks that suggested the U.S. not only "capture or kill Osama bin Laden", but also embark upon "a determined effort to remove Saddam Hussein from power in Iraq."

As a supporter of the Iraq War, Fukuyama defended the war against critics who accused the US of unilateralism and violating international law, saying "Americans are right to insist that there is no such thing as an 'international community' in the abstract, and that nation-states must ultimately look out for themselves when it comes to critical matters of security."

In a New York Times article from February 2006, Fukuyama, in considering the ongoing Iraq War, stated: "What American foreign policy needs is not a return to a narrow and cynical realism, but rather the formulation of a 'realistic Wilsonianism' that better matches means to ends." In regard to neoconservatism, he went on to say: "What is needed now are new ideas, neither neoconservative nor realist, for how America is to relate to the rest of the world – ideas that retain the neoconservative belief in the universality of human rights, but without its illusions about the efficacy of American power and hegemony to bring these ends about."

=== Current views ===
Fukuyama began to distance himself from the neoconservative agenda of the Bush administration, citing its excessive militarism and embrace of unilateral armed intervention, particularly in the Middle East. By mid-2004, Fukuyama had voiced his growing opposition to the Iraq War and called for Donald Rumsfeld's resignation as Secretary of Defense.

At an annual dinner of the American Enterprise Institute in February 2004, Dick Cheney and Charles Krauthammer declared the beginning of a unipolar era under American hegemony. "All of these people around me were cheering wildly," Fukuyama remembers. He believes that the Iraq War was being blundered. "All of my friends had taken leave of reality." He has not spoken to Paul Wolfowitz (previously a good friend) since.

Fukuyama declared he would not be voting for Bush, and that the Bush administration had made three mistakes:

- Overstating the threat of Islamist extremism to the US.
- Failing to foresee the fierce negative reaction to its "benevolent hegemony". From the very beginning showing a negative attitude toward the United Nations and other intergovernmental organizations and not seeing that it would increase anti-Americanism in other countries.
- Misjudging what was needed to bring peace in Iraq and being overly optimistic about the success with which social engineering of western values could be applied to Iraq and the Middle East in general.

Fukuyama believes the US has a right to promote its own values in the world, along the lines of what he calls "realistic Wilsonianism", which he contrasts with neoconservatism and "cynical realism."

The US should instead stimulate political and economic development and gain a better understanding of what happens in other countries. The best instruments are setting a good example and providing education and, in many cases, money. The secret of development, be it political or economic, is that it never comes from outsiders, but always from people in the country itself. One thing the US proved to have excelled in during the aftermath of World War II was the formation of international institutions. A return to support for these structures would combine American power with international legitimacy, but such measures require a lot of patience. This is the central thesis of his 2006 work America at the Crossroads.

In a 2006 essay in The New York Times Magazine strongly critical of the invasion, he identified neoconservatism with Leninism. He wrote that neoconservatives "believed that history can be pushed along with the right application of power and will. Leninism was a tragedy in its Bolshevik version, and it has returned as farce when practiced by the United States. Neoconservatism, as both a political symbol and a body of thought, has evolved into something I can no longer support."

Fukuyama announced the end of the neoconservative moment and argued for the demilitarization of the war on terrorism:

[W]ar is the wrong metaphor for the broader struggle, since wars are fought at full intensity and have clear beginnings and endings. Meeting the jihadist challenge is more of a "long, twilight struggle" [quoting John F. Kennedy's inaugural address] whose core is not a military campaign but a political contest for the hearts and minds of ordinary Muslims around the world.

Fukuyama endorsed Barack Obama in the 2008 US presidential election. He states:

I'm voting for Barack Obama this November for a very simple reason. It is hard to imagine a more disastrous presidency than that of George W. Bush. It was bad enough that he launched an unnecessary war and undermined the standing of the United States throughout the world in his first term. But in the waning days of his administration, he is presiding over a collapse of the American financial system and broader economy that will have consequences for years to come. As a general rule, democracies don't work well if voters do not hold political parties accountable for failure. While John McCain is trying desperately to pretend that he never had anything to do with the Republican Party, I think it would be a travesty to reward the Republicans for failure on such a grand scale.

In 2007 Fukuyama criticized the American government's attitude to Iran, "If the only thing we're putting on the table is that we'll talk to you, it isn't going to work. What the Iranians have really wanted over a long period of time is the grand bargain." In 2009 he described Iran as "not quite a tyranny, petty or grand" but also not a liberal democracy and added that "Iran could evolve towards a genuine rule-of-law democracy within the broad parameters of the 1979 constitution."

In a 2018 interview with New Statesman, when asked about his views on the resurgence of socialist politics in the United States and the United Kingdom, he responded:

It all depends on what you mean by socialism. Ownership of the means of production – except in areas where it's clearly called for, like public utilities – I don't think that's going to work. If you mean redistributive programmes that try to redress this big imbalance in both incomes and wealth that has emerged then, yes, I think not only can it come back, it ought to come back. This extended period, which started with Reagan and Thatcher, in which a certain set of ideas about the benefits of unregulated markets took hold, in many ways it's had a disastrous effect. At this juncture, it seems to me that certain things Karl Marx said are turning out to be true. He talked about the crisis of overproduction… that workers would be impoverished and there would be insufficient demand.

In a review for The Washington Post, Fukuyama discussed Ezra Klein's 2020 book Why We're Polarized regarding US politics, and outlined Klein's central conclusion about the importance of race and white identity to Donald Trump voters and Republicans.

In 2020, Fukuyama became the chair of the editorial board for American Purpose, a magazine established in 2020 to promote three central ideas. Firstly, it wants to promote liberal democracy in the United States. Secondly, it seeks to understand and opine on the challenges to liberal democracy in other countries. Thirdly, it wants to "offer criticism and commentary on history and biography, high art and pop culture, science and technology."

Fukuyama also perceived Joe Biden's victory in the 2020 presidential election as the result of the Western system's ability to correct mistakes.

=== Views following Russian invasion of Ukraine ===
A few weeks after the beginning of Russia's invasion of Ukraine in February 2022, Fukuyama made several prognoses in the magazine American Purpose:

- Russia was heading towards defeat, with its planning being incompetent and based on flawed assumptions about Ukrainians being favorable to Russia and about the Ukrainian military suffering immediate collapse in an invasion scenario. "Russian soldiers were evidently carrying dress uniforms for their victory parade in Kyiv rather than extra ammo and rations." The bulk of Russia's military had been committed to the invasion and so there were no vast reserves available to it.
- Russia's position could collapse suddenly and catastrophically rather than through a slow war of attrition. Its army would reach a point where it could be neither resupplied nor withdrawn, and morale would collapse accordingly.
- A Russian defeat was a prerequisite for any diplomatic solution to the war as otherwise both Russia and Ukraine's losses meant that there was no conceivable compromise which they could both accept.
- Vladimir Putin's rule over Russia would not survive a military defeat. "He gets support because he is perceived to be a strongman; what does he have to offer once he demonstrates incompetence and is stripped of his coercive power?"
- The invasion had done huge damage to populists such as Matteo Salvini, Jair Bolsonaro, Éric Zemmour, Marine Le Pen, Viktor Orbán, and Donald Trump; all had expressed sympathy for Putin before the war, and their "openly authoritarian" leanings had been exposed by the war's politics.
- The war thus far had been a "good lesson" for China whose military, like Russia's, was technologically sophisticated but had minimal combat experience. The People's Liberation Army Air Force's lack of experience in relation to complex air operations meant that in a future conflict it would likely replicate the poor performance of Russia's air force. "We may hope that the Chinese leadership will not delude itself as to its own capabilities the way the Russians did when contemplating a future move against Taiwan"; as for Taiwan itself, Fukuyama expressed his hope that it would now begin to prepare for a future conflict including by reintroducing conscription.
- "Turkish drones will become bestsellers."
- A Russian defeat would permit a "new birth of freedom" and assuage fears about the declining state of global democracy. The spirit of 1989 would live on thanks to Ukraine's bravery.

Fukuyama has also put emphasis on the importance of national identity for a sound defense of liberal values – and thus the need to reconcile the nation-state with liberal universalism, even if they seem at odds at first – in a Foreign Affairs article:

Liberalism, with its universalist pretensions, may sit uneasily alongside seemingly parochial nationalism, but the two can be reconciled. The goals of liberalism are entirely compatible with a world divided into nation-states. ... Liberal rights are meaningless if they cannot be enforced by a state. ... The territorial jurisdiction of a state necessarily corresponds to the area occupied by the group of individuals who signed on to the social contract. People living outside that jurisdiction must have their rights respected, but not necessarily enforced, by that state. ... The need for international cooperation in addressing issues such as global warming and pandemics has never been more evident. But it remains the case that one particular form of power, the ability to enforce rules through the threat or the actual use of force, remains under the control of nation-states… Ultimate power, in other words, continues to be the province of nation-states, which means that the control of power at this level remains critical. ... There is thus no necessary contradiction between liberal universalism and the need for nation-states. Although the normative value of human rights may be universal, enforcement power is not; it is a scarce resource that is necessarily applied in a territorially delimited way.

In a 2022 interview with El País, Fukuyama expressed support for social democratic policies: "In Germany, the Netherlands, Scandinavia, you've had social democratic parties in power for a long time. [They've] done a lot of redistribution – you don't get this kind of polarized politics and you have an alternation between the center-left and center-right, which I think is much healthier." However, Fukuyama also said that he "was never opposed to social democracy. I think that it really depends on the historical period and the degree of state intervention. By the 1960s, many social democratic societies had become mired in low growth [and] high inflation. At that point, I think it was important to roll some of that back. That is, in fact, what happened in Scandinavia. Most of those countries reduced tax rates, reduced levels of regulation and therefore became more productive. But I think that in the current period, we need more social democracy, especially in the United States."

On June 29, 2023, at an event hosted by Stanford University, Fukuyama met with the delegation from the Azov Brigade, posing for a picture with them and expressing his support "to Ukraine on [their] sure way to victory."

In a 2026 interview with Jacobin, Fukuyama stated that he no longer considered himself a conservative, characterising himself as a "classic social democrat" instead. He affirmed a belief in regulated markets with "a certain amount of distribution", arguing that this type of mixed economy was a "winning formula" post-World War II and suggesting that moving away from this was one of the reasons for increasing political instability in recent decades. However, he also described himself as more conservative regarding "certain cultural issues", especially identity politics, and welcomed an increasing focus on economic equality over identity politics among progressives in the Democratic Party. He also described Zohran Mamdani's approach to governing as mayor of New York City as "politically pretty smart", noting Mamdani's partial embrace of deregulation as advocated by the abundance movement and arguing that this was a necessity to deliver his agenda successfully.

== Affiliations ==
- Between 2006 and 2008, Fukuyama advised Muammar Gaddafi as part of the Monitor Group, a consultancy firm based in Cambridge, MA.
- In August 2005, Fukuyama co-founded The American Interest, a bimonthly magazine devoted to the broad theme of "America in the World". He served as chairman of the editorial board until his resignation. In a published letter posted on his public Medium page on July 27, 2020, Fukuyama cited a disagreement with the publisher's decision to terminate Jeff Gedmin as editor-in-chief. Fukuyama also indicated other changes underway at the publication as an additional reason for his resignation.
- Fukuyama was a member of the RAND Corporation's Political Science Department from 1979 to 1980, 1983 to 1989, and 1995 to 1996. He is now a member of the board of trustees.
- Fukuyama was a member of the President's Council on Bioethics from 2001 to 2004.
- Fukuyama is a Fellow of the World Academy of Art and Science (WAAS).
- Fukuyama was on the steering committee for the Scooter Libby Legal Defense Trust. Fukuyama is a long-time friend of Libby. They served together in the State Department in the 1980s.
- Fukuyama is a member of the Board of Counselors for the Pyle Center of Northeast Asian Studies at the National Bureau of Asian Research.
- Fukuyama is on the board of Global Financial Integrity.
- Fukuyama is a member of the Inter-American Dialogue.
- Fukuyama is the chair of the editorial board for American Purpose, a magazine established in 2020.
- Fukuyama is a member of the International Advisory Board for Bellingcat.

== Personal life ==
Fukuyama is a part-time photographer. He also has an interest in early American furniture, which he reproduces by hand. Another hobby of Fukuyama's is sound recording and reproduction. He explained, "These days I seem to spend as much time thinking about gear as I do analyzing politics for my day job." Since the mid-1990s, Fukuyama has been building his own personal computers.

Fukuyama is married to Laura Holmgren, whom he met when she was a University of California, Los Angeles graduate student after he started working for the RAND Corporation. He dedicated his book Trust: The Social Virtues and the Creation of Prosperity to her. They live in California, with their three children, Julia, David, and John.

He is the first cousin to crime novelist Joe Ide. Fukuyama helped him get his first book published.

== Selected bibliography ==
=== Scholarly works ===
- The Soviet Union and Iraq since 1968. RAND Corporation (1980).

=== Books ===
External videos
- Booknotes interview with Fukuyama on The End of History and the Last Man, February 9, 1992, C-SPAN
- Presentation by Fukuyama on The Great Disruption, June 10, 1999, C-SPAN
- Presentation by Fukuyama on The Great Disruption, April 19, 2000, C-SPAN
- Presentation by Fukuyama on Our Posthuman Future, May 9, 2002, C-SPAN
- Presentation by Fukuyama on State-Building, May 21, 2004, C-SPAN
- Presentation by Fukuyama on The Origins of Political Order, April 25, 2011, C-SPAN
- Presentation by Fukuyama on Political Order and Political Decay, October 25, 2014, C-SPAN
- Presentation by Fukuyama on Identity, September 20, 2018, C-SPAN
- Presentation by Fukuyama on Identity, October 28, 2018, C-SPAN

- The End of History and the Last Man. Free Press, 1992. ISBN 0-02-910975-2
- Trust: The Social Virtues and the Creation of Prosperity. Free Press, 1995. ISBN 0-02-910976-0
- The Great Disruption: Human Nature and the Reconstitution of Social Order. Free Press. 1999. ISBN 0-684-84530-X
- Our Posthuman Future: Consequences of the Biotechnology Revolution. New York, NY: Farrar, Straus and Giroux. 2002. ISBN 0-374-23643-7
- State-Building: Governance and World Order in the 21st century. Ithaca, NY: Cornell University Press. 2004. ISBN 0-8014-4292-3
- America at the Crossroads: Democracy, Power, and the Neoconservative Legacy. New Haven, CT: Yale University Press. 2006. ISBN 0-300-11399-4 US edition
  After the Neo Cons: Where the Right went Wrong. London: Profile Books. 2006. ISBN 1-86197-922-3 UK edition
- Falling Behind: Explaining the Development Gap Between Latin America and the United States (editor). New York, NY: Oxford University Press. 2008. ISBN 978-0-19-536882-6
- The Origins of Political Order: From Prehuman Times to the French Revolution. New York, NY: Farrar, Straus and Giroux. 2011. ISBN 978-1-846-68256-8
- Political Order and Political Decay: From the Industrial Revolution to the Present Day. New York: Farrar, Straus and Giroux. 2014. ISBN 978-0-374-22735-7
- Identity: The Demand for Dignity and the Politics of Resentment, New York: Farrar, Straus and Giroux. 2018.
- Liberalism and Its Discontents, New York: Farrar, Straus and Giroux. 2022.
- In the Realm of the Last Man: A Memoir, New York, NY: Farrar, Straus and Giroux. 2026. ISBN 978-0-374-62043-1

=== Essays ===
- "The End of History?" The National Interest, no. 16 (Summer 1989).
- "Women and the Evolution of World Politics." Foreign Affairs (Oct. 1998).
- "Immigrants and Family Values." The Immigration Reader (1998). ISBN 1557869162.
- "Human Nature and the Reconstruction of Social Order." The Atlantic Monthly (May 1999).
- "Social Capital and Civil Society." Paper prepared for delivery at the International Monetary Fund Conference on Second Generation Reforms (Oct. 1, 1999).
- "The Neoconservative Moment." The National Interest (Summer 2004).
- "After Neoconservatism." New York Times Magazine (Feb. 19, 2006).
- "Supporter's Voice Now Turns on Bush." New York Times Magazine (Mar. 14, 2006).
- "Why Shouldn't I Change My Mind?" Los Angeles Times (Apr. 9, 2006).
- "The Fall of America, Inc." Newsweek (Oct. 13, 2008).
- "The New Nationalism and the Strategic Architecture of Northeast Asia." Asia Policy (Jan. 2007)
- "Left Out." The American Interest (Jan. 2011).
- "Is China Next?" The Wall Street Journal (Mar. 12, 2011).
- "The Future of History: Can Liberal Democracy Survive the Decline of the Middle Class?" Foreign Affairs (Jan./Feb. 2012).
- "What is Governance?" Governance (Mar. 2013).
- "Against Identity Politics: The New Tribalism and the Crisis of Democracy." Foreign Affairs (Sep./Oct. 2018).
- "Liberalism and Its Discontents: The Challenges from the Left and the Right." American Purpose (Oct. 2020).
- How to Save Democracy From Technology, Foreign Affairs, November 24, 2020 (co-authored with Barak Richman and Ashish Goel)
- "Still the End of History." The Atlantic (Oct. 2022).
- See Ronald T. Libby, "The Death of Political Science and Rebirth of Politics."
- China's Road to Ruin, Foreign Affairs, August 22, 2023 (co-authored with Michael Bennon)
- The Year of Elections Has Been Good for Democracy, Foreign Affairs, September 4, 2024

== See also ==
- Biopolitics
- High trust and low trust societies
- Transhumanism § Threats to morality and democracy
- Obama Republicans (disambiguation)
- Vetocracy
