= Direct Influence =

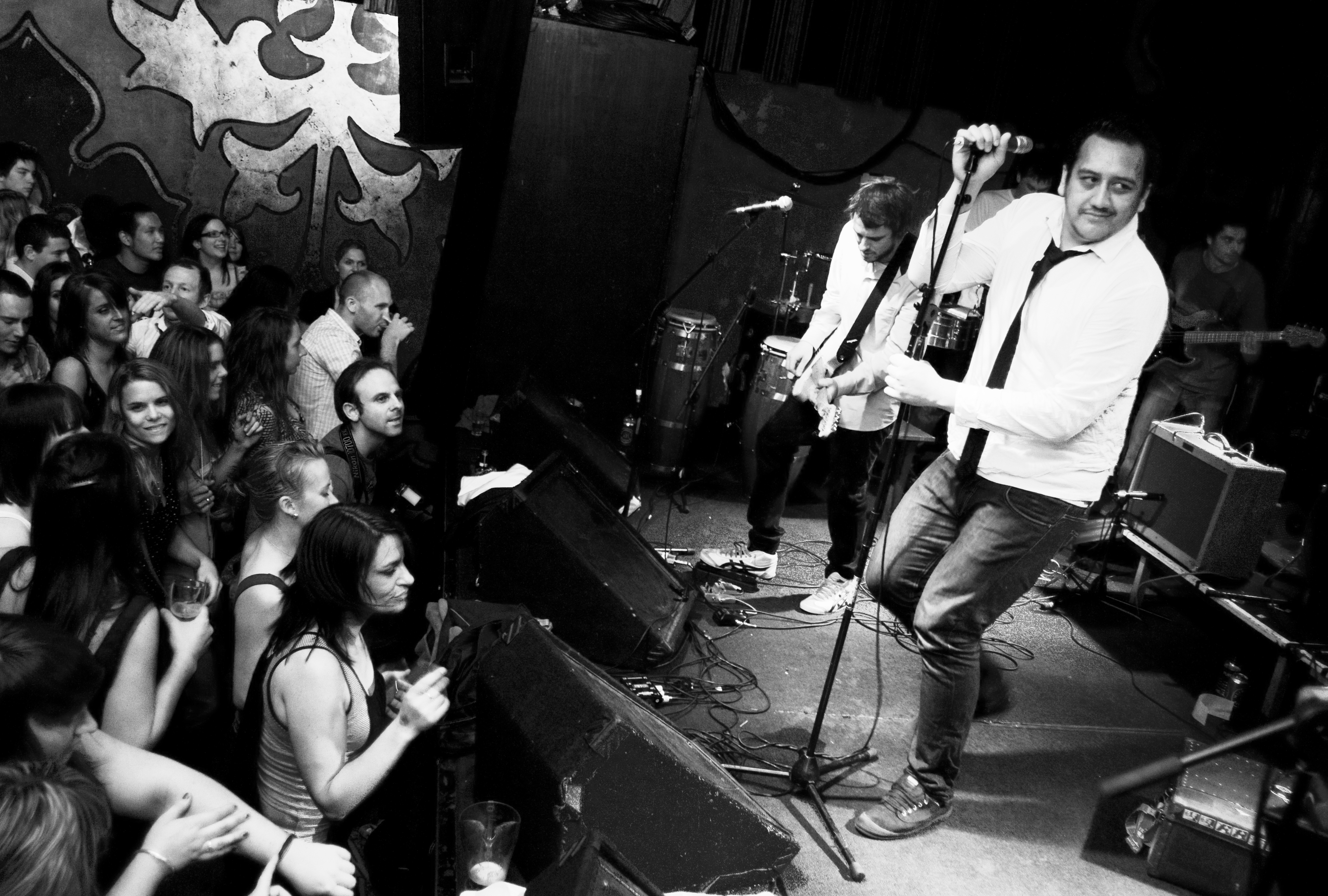
- Direct Influece performing "Final Word" for its single launch

Background information
- Origin: Melbourne, Victoria, Australia
- Genres: Electro, rock, reggae
- Years active: 2006–present
- Label: Independent
- Members: Dylan Smith; Marcus Ross; Mikey Chan; Matt Bray; Pat Kilby; Jarrah Whyte
- Website: www.directinfluencemusic.com

Direct Influence are an Australian electro, rock and reggae group formed and fronted by Dylan Smith and Marcus Ross. Smith (from Mahia, New Zealand) and Ross (from Gippsland, Victoria, Australia) describe the group as the combination of their respective musical backgrounds - 'With two countries so close, it was only a matter of time before NZ and OZ developed a cross-Tasman sound'.

== History ==
Having released 2 EPs, Direct Influence commenced development of their first studio album in 2009.

Throughout 2010, Direct Influence released and toured debut studio album 'War in My Kitchen', performed over 70 local, interstate and international shows and secured festival appearances at The Hills Are Alive, St Kilda Festival, Woodford Folk Festival, Japan Music Week, Rhythm & Vines Festival

'War in My Kitchen' featured guest vocals on 'For My People' from ARIA Best Male Artist of 2010, Dan Sultan and was officially released on 14 May 2010 through Shock Records. Lead single 'Final Word Feat. EQ' received official rotation on nationally broadcast station Triple J as well as coverage of the album, interviews and performances across many local and community radio stations and TV performances on both Melbourne's Ch 31 and TVNZ's Good Morning.

== Live performances ==
2010 performances included support of The Original Wailers, Chali 2Na, Kora, The Black Seeds and Bonjah.

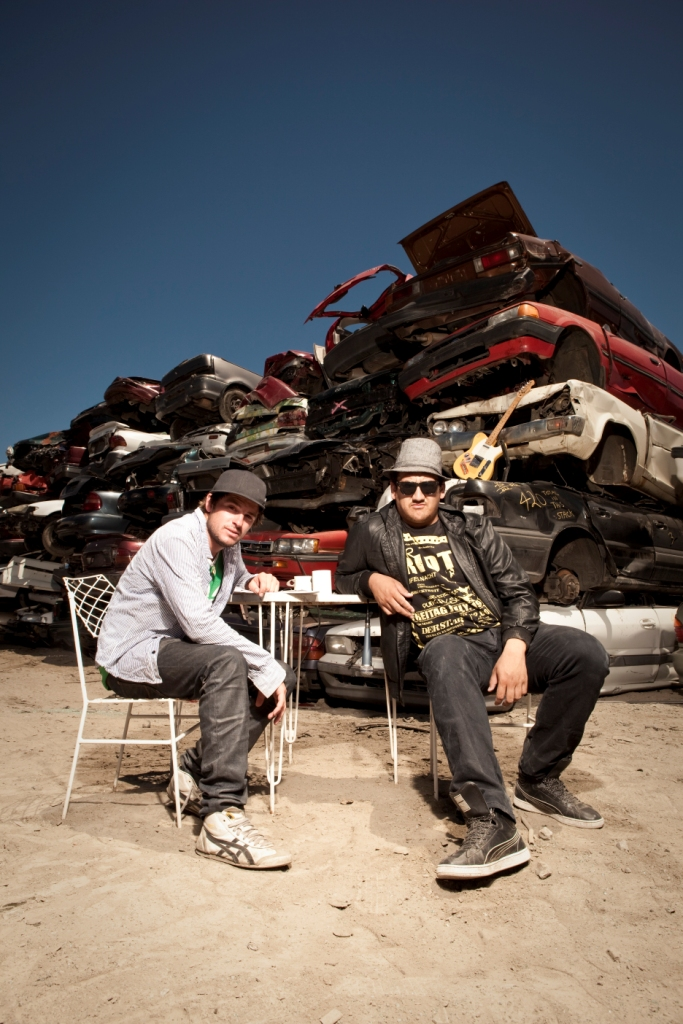
Marcus Ross and Dylan Smith

War in My Kitchen album tour consisted of 21 performances through April and May in Melbourne, Brisbane, Byron Bay, Sydney, Adelaide, Perth, Margaret River, Fremantle, Hobart, Launceston, Auckland, Napier, Dunedin, Wellington, Christchurch, Queenstown and several regional towns forming the single biggest tour of the band's career.

== Band members ==
Currently, Direct Influence are backed by a four piece live performance band consisting of drums, bass, keys and lead guitar. Live drums are performed by Matt Bray from The Metals and 28 Days, Lucas Taranto (Gotye) or Pat Kilby (The Red Eyes) on Bass Guitar, Mikey Chan on Lead Guitar (Pharoahe Monch/Phrase/M-Phazes) and Jarrah Whyte on keys. Through 2010 this session musician line-up also included rotation of Ivan (Choi) Khatchoyan (of Cookin on Three Burners), Simon Mavin (of Whitesploitation) and Luke Saunders on keys.

Past members and session players: Andrew Rothberg, Drew Thomas, Lachie Ross, Clinton Cox, Syd Preece, Simon Rabl, Leigh Fisher, David De Podolinsky, Dwayne Hawke, Bill Tarrant, Jonothan Steer, Eliza Hull, Jeremy Hopkins, Lady Nadee, Candice Monique, Jess Harlen, Alex Rowe, David Tweedy,

Marcus and Dylan are now collaborating with Hayley Aitken and Roger Kalix on an upcoming project.

== Discography ==
- Herbal Ninja (EP)- 2006
- Better Day (EP) - 2008
- Final Word (single) - 2009
- War in My Kitchen (album) - 2010
