= Obama Republicans =

Obama Republicans can refer to either of the following:

- Republican and conservative support for Barack Obama in 2008, conservatives and Republicans who supported 2008 Democratic presidential nominee Barack Obama.
- Obama–Trump voters, those who voted for Obama in 2008 and/or 2012, and also voted for Republican presidential nominee Donald Trump in 2016, 2020 and/or 2024
