= The End of History and the Last Man =

1992 book by Francis Fukuyama

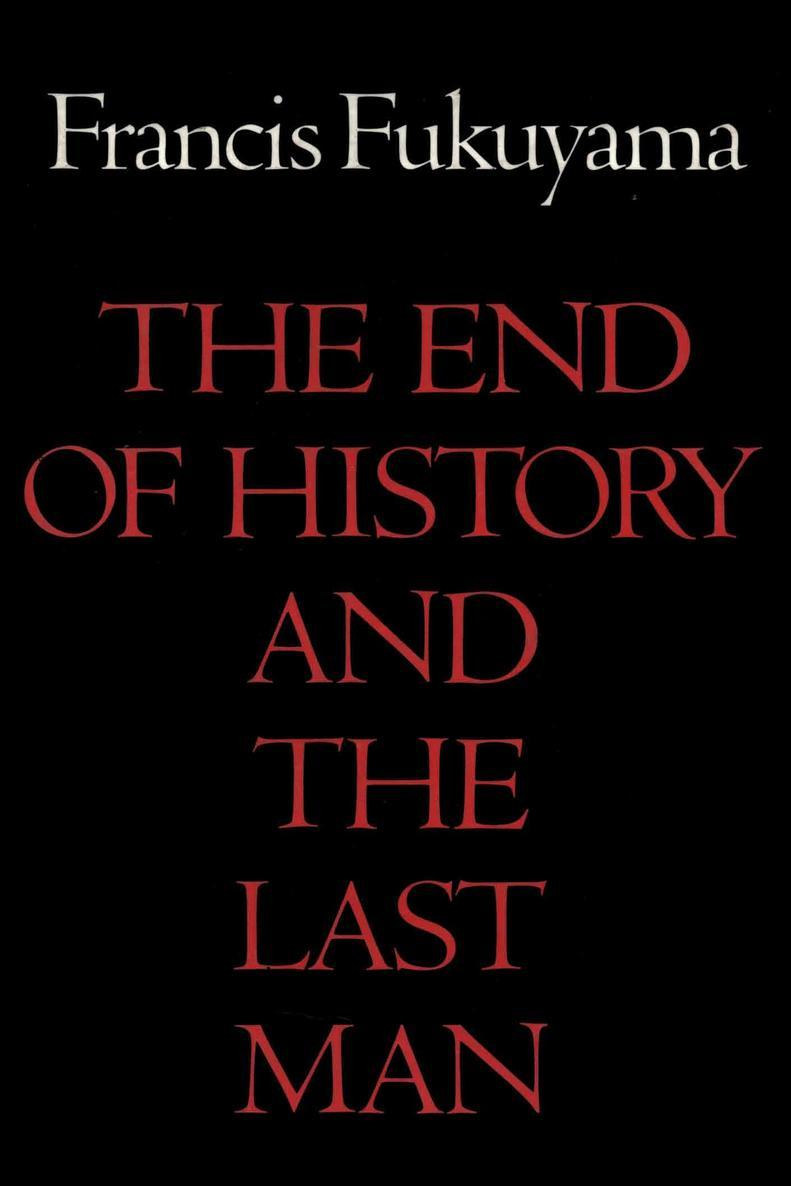
- Author: Francis Fukuyama
- Language: English
- Subject: Geopolitics; Political philosophy
- Publisher: Free Press
- Publication date: 1992
- Publication place: United States
- Media type: Print
- Pages: 418
- ISBN: 978-0-02-910975-5
- Followed by: Trust

The End of History and the Last Man is a book of political philosophy written in 1992 by American political scientist Francis Fukuyama, which argues that with the ascendancy of Western liberal democracy which occurred after the Cold War (1947–1991) and dissolution of the Soviet Union (1991), humanity has reached "not just [...] the passing of a particular period of post-war history, but the "end of history" as such: That is, the end-point of mankind's ideological evolution and the universalization of Western liberal democracy as the final form of human government." The book expands on Fukuyama's essay "The End of History?", published in the Summer 1989 issue of The National Interest journal.

Fukuyama draws upon the philosophies and ideologies of G. W. F. Hegel and Karl Marx, who explain human history as a dialectical progression from one socioeconomic epoch to another. It has been criticized by political scientists and philosophers on the left and right as oversimplifying the political state of the world. Fukuyama has acknowledged that the book did not anticipate subsequent democratic backsliding from liberal democracies into authoritarianism, but also states that the book's central thesis is commonly misunderstood.

== Overview ==
Francis Fukuyama in 1996

Fukuyama argues that history should be viewed as an evolutionary process, and that the end of history, in this sense, means that liberal democracy is the final form of government for all nations. According to Fukuyama, since the French Revolution (1789–1799), liberal democracy has repeatedly proven to be a fundamentally better system (ethically, politically, economically) than any alternatives, and so there can be no progression from it to an alternative system. Fukuyama claims not that events will stop occurring in the future, but rather that all that will happen in the future (even if totalitarianism returns) is that democracy will become more and more prevalent in the long term.

Critics argue that Fukuyama presents "American-style" democracy as the only "correct" political system and argues that all countries must inevitably follow this particular system of government. However, a number of Fukuyama scholars claim this is a misreading of his work. Fukuyama's argument is that in the future there will be more and more governments that use the framework of parliamentary democracy and that contain markets of some sort. He has said:

The End of History was never linked to a specifically American model of social or political organization. Following Alexandre Kojève, the Russian-French philosopher who inspired my original argument, I believe that the European Union more accurately reflects what the world will look like at the end of history than the contemporary United States. The EU's attempt to transcend sovereignty and traditional power politics by establishing a transnational rule of law is much more in line with a "post-historical" world than the Americans' continuing belief in God, national sovereignty, and their military.

== Arguments in favor ==
An argument in favor of Fukuyama's thesis is the democratic peace theory, which argues that mature democracies rarely or never go to war with one another. This theory has faced criticism, with arguments largely resting on conflicting definitions of "war" and "mature democracy". Part of the difficulty in assessing the theory is that democracy as a widespread global phenomenon emerged only recently in human history, which makes generalizing about it difficult.

Other major empirical evidence includes the elimination of interstate warfare in South America, Southeast Asia, and Eastern Europe among countries that moved from military dictatorship to liberal democracies.

According to several studies, the end of the Cold War and the subsequent increase in the number of liberal democratic states were accompanied by a sudden and dramatic decline in total warfare, interstate wars, ethnic wars, revolutionary wars, and the number of refugees and displaced persons.

== Criticisms ==
=== Political Islam, tribalism, and the "Clash of Civilizations" ===
Various Western commentators have described the thesis of The End of History as flawed because it does not sufficiently take into account the power of ethnic loyalties and religious movements as a counter-force to the spread of liberal democracy, with the specific example of Islamic fundamentalism or Caliphate, as the most powerful of these.

Benjamin Barber wrote a 1992 article and a 1995 book, Jihad vs. McWorld, that addressed this theme. Barber described "McWorld" as a secular, liberal, corporate-friendly transformation of the world and used the word "jihad" to refer to the competing forces of tribalism and religious fundamentalism, with a special emphasis on Islamic fundamentalism.

Samuel P. Huntington wrote a 1993 essay, The Clash of Civilizations, in direct response to The End of History; he then expanded the essay into a 1996 book, The Clash of Civilizations and the Remaking of World Order. In the essay and book, Huntington argued that the temporary conflict between ideologies is being replaced by the ancient conflict between civilizations. The dominant civilization decides the form of human government, and these will not be constant. He especially singled out Islam, which he described as having "bloody borders".

After the September 11 attacks of 2001, The End of History was cited by some commentators as a symbol of the supposed naiveté and undue optimism of the Western world during the 1990s, in thinking that the end of the Cold War also represented the end of major global conflict. In the weeks after the attacks, Fareed Zakaria called the events "the end of the end of history", while George Will wrote that history had "returned from vacation".

Fukuyama did discuss radical Islam briefly in The End of History. He argued that Islamism is not an imperialist force like Stalinism and fascism; that is, it has little intellectual or emotional appeal outside the Islamic "heartlands". Fukuyama pointed to the economic and political difficulties that Iran and Saudi Arabia face and argued that such states are fundamentally unstable: either they will become democracies with a Muslim society (like Turkey) or they will simply disintegrate. Moreover, when Islamic states have actually been created, they were easily dominated by the powerful Western states.

However, some scholars have challenged Fukuyama's claims, arguing that his analysis underestimates the adaptability and influence of Islam in the global political landscape. Islam has consistently expanded beyond its historical heartlands, shaping cultural and intellectual movements worldwide. Moreover, political instability in some Muslim-majority nations is often attributed to colonial legacies, foreign interventions, and economic pressures rather than an inherent flaw in Islamic governance. Countries such as Malaysia, Indonesia, Qatar and the United Arab Emirates etc. have demonstrated political stability while integrating Islamic principles.

Additionally, the framing of Western liberal democracy as the ultimate political evolution overlooks alternative governance models rooted in justice (adl), consultation (shura), and public welfare (maslaha), which have been central to Islamic political thought. Critics argue that Fukuyama's perspective reflects a Western-centric assumption that stability and progress must align with liberal democracy, ignoring the resilience and diversity of Islamic governance throughout history. Western democracies themselves face significant instability (e.g., political polarization, economic inequality), challenging the notion that they are the only viable political model.

In October 2001, Fukuyama, in a Wall Street Journal opinion piece, responded to criticism of his thesis after the September 11 attacks, saying, "I believe that in the end I remain right". He explained that what he meant by "End of History" was the evolution of human political system, toward that of the "liberal-democratic West". He also noted that his original thesis "does not imply a world free from conflict, nor the disappearance of culture as a distinguishing characteristic of societies".

=== The resurgence of Russia and China ===
Another challenge to the "end of history" thesis is the growth in the economic and political power of two countries, Russia and China. China has a one-party state government, while Russia, though formally a democracy, is often described as an autocracy; it is categorized as an anocracy in the Polity data series.

Azar Gat, Professor of National Security at Tel Aviv University, argued this point in his 2007 Foreign Affairs article, "The Return of Authoritarian Great Powers", stating that the success of these two countries could "end the end of history". Gat also discussed political Islam, but stated that the movements associated with it "represent no viable alternative to modernity and pose no significant military threat to the developed world". He considered the challenge of China and Russia to be the major threat, since they could pose a viable rival model which could inspire other states.

This view was echoed by Robert Kagan in his 2008 book, The Return of History and the End of Dreams, whose title was a deliberate rejoinder to The End of History.

In his 2008 Washington Post opinion piece, Fukuyama also addressed this point. He wrote, "Despite recent authoritarian advances, liberal democracy remains the strongest, most broadly appealing idea out there. Most autocrats, including Putin and Chávez, still feel that they have to conform to the outward rituals of democracy even as they gut its substance. Even China's Hu Jintao felt compelled to talk about democracy in the run-up to Beijing's Olympic Games."

His "ultimate nightmare", he said in March 2022, is a world in which China supports Russia's invasion of Ukraine and Russia supports a Chinese invasion of Taiwan. If that were to happen, and be successful, Fukuyama said, "then you would really be living in a world that was being dominated by these non-democratic powers. If the United States and the rest of the West couldn't stop that from happening, then that really is the end of the end of history."

In an April 2026 interview with Sam Harris, Fukuyama remarked:

"I think that the Chinese have created a pretty impressive system. It is authoritarian. It's quasi-market-based and they are very successful at marshalling new technology ... They're capable of innovating a lot of things we thought they weren't able to do. And conversely, democracy, especially American democracy, looks like it's falling apart ... If the Chinese keep their development machine going, it may turn out that they have a real alternative."

In an opinion article in the South China Morning Post, columnist Alex Lo comments that "Fukuyama has gone from 'the West is the best' to 'the end of the West is nigh', and now seemingly, “'the East is red'".

=== Failure of civil society and political decay ===
In 2014, on the occasion of the 25th anniversary of the publication of the original essay, "The End of History?", Fukuyama wrote a column in The Wall Street Journal again updating his hypothesis. He wrote that, while liberal democracy still had no real competition from more authoritarian systems of government "in the realm of ideas", nevertheless he was less idealistic than he had been "during the heady days of 1989". Fukuyama noted the Orange Revolution (2004–2005) in Ukraine and the Arab Spring (2010s), both of which seemed to have failed in their pro-democracy goals, as well as the democratic backsliding in countries including Thailand, Turkey and Nicaragua. He stated that the biggest problem for the democratically elected governments in some countries was not ideological but "their failure to provide the substance of what people want from government: personal security, shared economic growth and the basic public services [...] that are needed to achieve individual opportunity." Though he believed that economic growth, improved government and civic institutions all reinforced one another, he wrote that it was not inevitable that "all countries will [...] get on that escalator".

Twenty-five years later, the most serious threat to the end-of-history hypothesis isn't that there is a higher, better model out there that will someday supersede liberal democracy; neither Islamist theocracy nor Chinese capitalism cuts it. Once societies get on the up escalator of industrialization, their social structure begins to change in ways that increase demands for political participation. If political elites accommodate these demands, we arrive at some version of democracy.

Fukuyama also warned of "political decay", which he wrote could also affect established democracies like the United States, in which corruption and crony capitalism erode liberty and economic opportunity. Nevertheless, he expressed his continued belief that "the power of the democratic ideal remains immense".

Fukuyama has acknowledged that there are ways that liberal democracies have backslid into authoritarianism that he did not anticipate in The End of History. Following the United Kingdom's decision to leave the European Union and the election of Donald Trump as U.S. president in 2016, Fukuyama feared for the future of liberal democracy in the face of resurgent populism, and the rise of a "post-fact world", saying that "twenty five years ago, I didn't have a sense or a theory about how democracies can go backward. And I think they clearly can." He warned that America's political rot was infecting the world order to the point where it "could be as big as the Soviet collapse". Fukuyama also highlighted Russia's interference in the Brexit referendum and 2016 U.S. elections. In 2021, on Dan Banik's podcast In Pursuit of Development, he noted, "The biggest disappointment in many ways is actually what's happened in the United States, because I really didn't think that, you know, the country would be capable of electing someone like Trump, and I didn't think so many Americans would be capable of being so fanatically attached to him."

=== Posthuman future ===
Fukuyama has also stated that his thesis was incomplete, but for a different reason: "there can be no end of history without an end of modern natural science and technology" (quoted from Our Posthuman Future). Fukuyama predicts that humanity's control of its own evolution will have a great and possibly terrible effect on liberal democracy.

=== Jacques Derrida ===
In Specters of Marx: The State of the Debt, the Work of Mourning and the New International (1993), Jacques Derrida criticized Fukuyama as a "come-lately reader" of the philosopher-statesman Alexandre Kojève (1902–1968), who "in the tradition of Leo Strauss" (1899–1973), in the 1950s, already had described the society of the U.S. as the "realization of communism"; and said that the public-intellectual celebrity of Fukuyama and the mainstream popularity of The End of History and the Last Man, were symptoms of cultural anxiety about ensuring the "Death of Marx". In criticising Fukuyama's celebration of his perceived economic and cultural hegemony of Western liberalism, Derrida said:

...never have violence, inequality, exclusion, famine, and thus economic oppression affected as many human beings in the history of the earth and of humanity. Instead of singing the advent of the ideal of liberal democracy and of the capitalist market in the euphoria of the end of history, instead of celebrating the 'end of ideologies' and the end of the great emancipatory discourses, let us never neglect this obvious, macroscopic fact, made up of innumerable, singular sites of suffering: no degree of progress allows one to ignore that never before, in absolute figures, have so many men, women and children been subjugated, starved or exterminated on the earth.

Therefore, Derrida said: "This end of History is essentially a Christian eschatology. It is consonant with the current discourse of the Pope on the European Community: Destined to become [either] a Christian State or [a] Super-State; this community would still belong, therefore, to some Holy Alliance".

=== Split between democracy and capitalism ===
Slovenian philosopher Slavoj Žižek argues that Fukuyama's idea that we have reached the end of history is not wholly true. Žižek points out that liberal democracy is linked to capitalism; however, the success of capitalism in authoritarian nations like China and Singapore shows that the link between capitalism and democracy is broken. Problems caused by the success of capitalism and neo-liberal policies, such as greater wealth inequality and environmental hazards, manifested in multiple countries with unrest towards elected governments. As a result, liberal democracy has struggled to survive a number of the problems caused by a free market economy and multiple nations would see a decline in the quality of their democracy.

== Publication history ==
- Free Press, 1992, hardcover (ISBN 0-02-910975-2)
- Perennial, 1993, paperback (ISBN 0-380-72002-7)

== See also ==
- Last Man
- Moral progress
- Status quo bias
- Thumos
- Whig history
