= End of history =

Political and philosophical concept

The end of history is a political and philosophical concept that supposes that a particular political, economic, or social system may develop that would constitute the end-point of humanity's sociocultural evolution and the final form of human government. A variety of authors have argued that a particular system is the "end of history" including Thomas More in Utopia (1516), Georg Wilhelm Friedrich Hegel, Vladimir Solovyov, Alexandre Kojève, and most famously Francis Fukuyama in the 1992 book The End of History and the Last Man. In the book, he argued that there are no longer any viable ideological competitors to liberal democracy and market capitalism.

== History ==
The phrase the end of history was first used by the French philosopher and mathematician Antoine Augustin Cournot in 1861 "to refer to the end of the historical dynamic with the perfection of civil society". Arnold Gehlen adopted it in 1952 and it has been taken up more recently by Martin Heidegger and Gianni Vattimo.

The formal development of an idea of an "end of history" is most closely associated with Georg Wilhelm Friedrich Hegel, although Hegel discussed the idea in ambiguous terms, making it unclear whether he thought such a thing was a certainty or a mere possibility. The goal of Hegel's philosophy of history was to show that history is a process of the realization of reason, for which he does not name a definite endpoint. Hegel believes that it is on the one hand the task of history to show that there is essentially reason in the development over time, while on the other hand history itself also has the task of developing reason over time. The realization of history is thus something that one can observe, but also something that is an active task.

== In postmodernism ==
A postmodern understanding of the term differs in that:

The idea of an "end of history" does not imply that nothing more will ever happen. Rather, what the postmodern sense of an end of history tends to signify is, in the words of contemporary historian Keith Jenkins, the idea that "the peculiar ways in which the past was historicized (was conceptualized in modernist, linear and essentially metanarrative forms) has now come to an end of its productive life; the all-encompassing 'experiment of modernity' ... is passing away into our postmodern condition".

== Francis Fukuyama ==
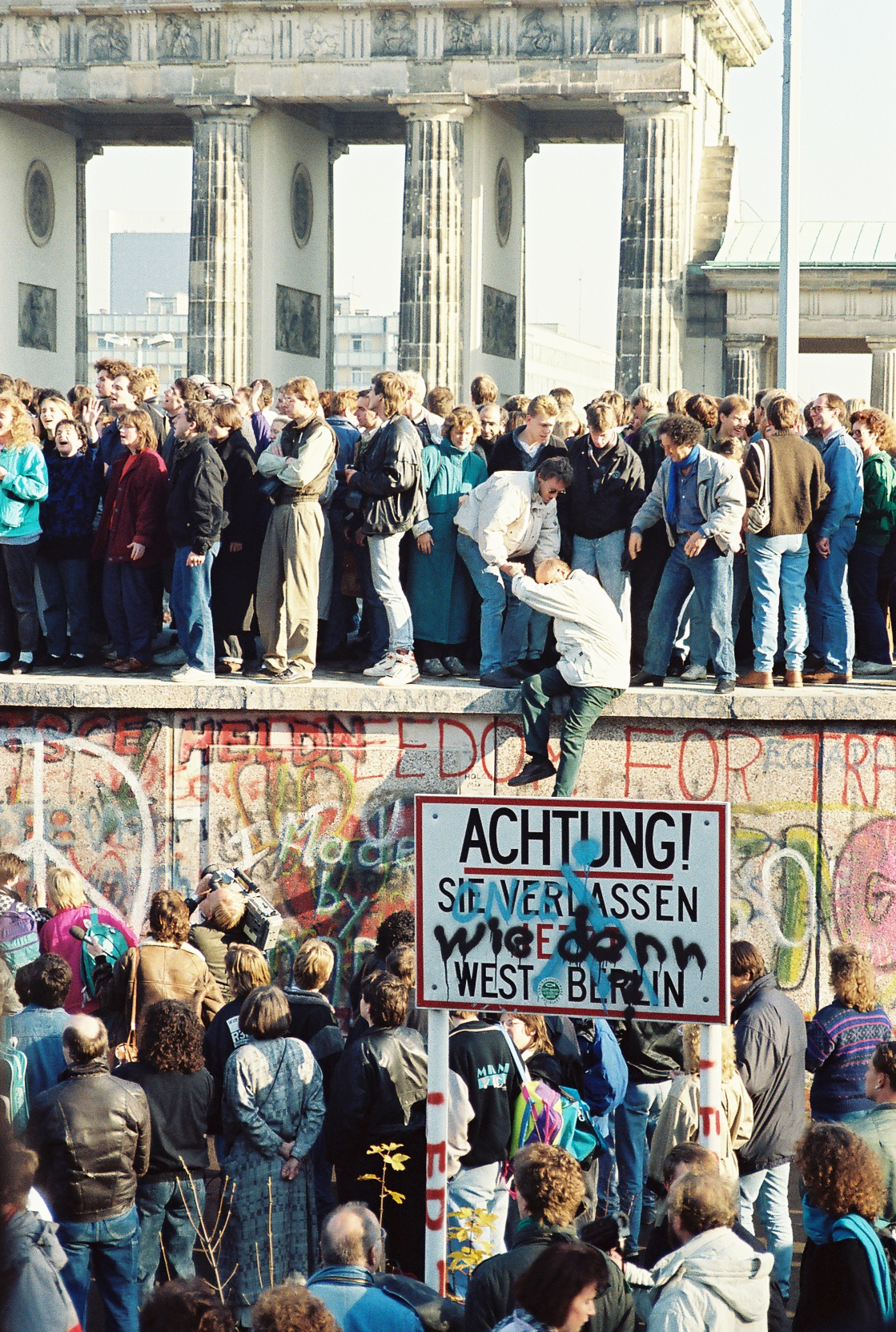
The demolition of the Berlin Wall in November 1989

A name that is commonly linked to the concept of the end of history in contemporary discourse is Francis Fukuyama. Fukuyama brought the term back to the forefront with his essay The End of History? that was published months before the fall of the Berlin Wall in 1989. In this essay, which he later expanded upon in his book The End of History and the Last Man in 1992, Fukuyama builds on the knowledge of Hegel, Marx and Kojève. The essay centers around the idea that now that its two most important competitors, fascism and communism, have been defeated, there should no longer be any serious competition for liberal democracy and the market economy.

In his theory, Fukuyama distinguishes between the material or real world and the world of ideas or consciousness. He believes that in the realm of ideas liberalism has proven to be triumphant, meaning that even though a successful liberal democracy and market economy have not yet been established everywhere, there are no longer any ideological competitors for these systems. This would mean that any fundamental contradiction in human life can be worked out within the context of modern liberalism and would not need an alternative political-economic structure to be resolved. Now that the end of history is reached, Fukuyama believes that international relations would be primarily concerned with economic matters and no longer with politics or strategy, thus reducing the chances of a large scale international violent conflict.

Fukuyama concludes that the end of history will be a sad time, because the potential of ideological struggles that people were prepared to risk their lives for has now been replaced with the prospect of "economic calculation, the endless solving of technical problems, environmental concerns and the satisfaction of sophisticated consumer demands." This does not mean that Fukuyama believes that a modern liberal democracy is the perfect political system, but rather that he does not think another political structure can provide citizens with the levels of wealth and personal liberties that a liberal democracy can.

Following the end of the Cold War, as liberal democracy and free market economy began to dominate even outside the traditional Western World, this was also referred to as the world being on vacation from history. As the war on terror, following the 2001 September 11 attacks, and the Second Cold War escalated during the 21st century, the vacation was referred to as being over. The recrudescence of anti-democratic movements and democratic backsliding in the post-9/11 era led scholars to identify the 2010s as the beginning of a "third wave of autocratization".

== See also ==
- War to end all wars
- Capitalist Realism
- Chronocentrism
- Philosophy of history
- Sociocultural evolution
- Immanentize the eschaton
- Peace
- New world order
