= Clash of Civilizations =

Cultural conflict thesis by Samuel P. Huntington

The Clash of Civilizations and the Remaking of World Order
- Author: Samuel P. Huntington
- Language: English
- Subject: Geopolitics; Political science
- Publisher: Simon & Schuster
- Publication date: 1996
- Publication place: United States
- Media type: Print
- Pages: 367
- ISBN: 978-0-68-481164-2
- OCLC: 38269418

The Clash of Civilizations and the Remaking of World Order is a 1996 book by American political scientist Samuel P. Huntington, in which he developed the clash of civilizations thesis that argues that cultural and religious identities will be the primary source of conflict in the post–Cold War world.

After the end of the Cold War, some thinkers argued that capitalism, liberal democracy, human rights and a market economy had become the only remaining ideological possibilities. In particular, Huntington's former student Francis Fukuyama proposed in his 1992 book The End of History and the Last Man that liberal democracy may represent the end of history in a Hegelian sense. Huntington responded to Fukuyama in a 1992 lecture at the American Enterprise Institute, and later expanded his ideas in a 1993 Foreign Affairs article titled The Clash of Civilizations? and his subsequent 1996 book.

Huntington believed that while the age of ideology had ended, the world had only reverted to a normal state of affairs characterized by cultural conflict. Huntington argued that future wars would be fought not between countries, but between cultures. He posited that the concept of civilizations, as the highest category of cultural identity, will become increasingly useful in analyzing the potential for conflict. Toward the end of his 1993 article, Huntington stated that this theory was not an argument for the desirability of such conflicts, but that it was necessary to consider its "implications for Western policy".

For Huntington, the clash of civilizations represents a development of history. In the past, world history was mainly about the struggles between monarchs, nations and ideologies, such as that seen within the Western civilization. However, after the end of the Cold War, he believed that world politics moved into a new phase in which non-Western civilizations are no longer the exploited recipients of Western civilization but have become additional important actors joining the West to shape and move world history.

Huntington's thesis was influential in academia and politics. It is argued to have motivated both the strategies of Islamic extremism and the war on terror, and has been identified as an ideological influence on nationalist politicians such as Donald Trump, Viktor Orbán, and Benjamin Netanyahu. The thesis has been criticized for exaggerating cultural differences, for failing to accurately predict where conflicts would occur, and for misidentifying the sources of conflict. Critics argue that conflicts such as the Syrian civil war, the Yemeni civil war and the Russo-Ukrainian war (a possibility that Huntington explicitly rejected) demonstrate that the most significant conflicts have occurred within and not between Huntington's civilizational groupings.

== Background ==
The phrase "clash of civilizations" was used in 1946 by Albert Camus to refer to decolonization, by Girilal Jain in 1988 in his analysis of the Ayodhya dispute, by Bernard Lewis in an article in the September 1990 issue of The Atlantic Monthly titled The Roots of Muslim Rage and by Mahdi El Mandjra in his 1992 book La première guerre civilisationnelle. Even earlier, the phrase appears in a 1926 book regarding the Middle East by Basil Mathews: Young Islam on Trek: A Study in the Clash of Civilizations. This expression derives from clash of cultures, already used during the colonial period and the Belle Époque.

== Huntington's thesis ==
=== Major civilizations ===
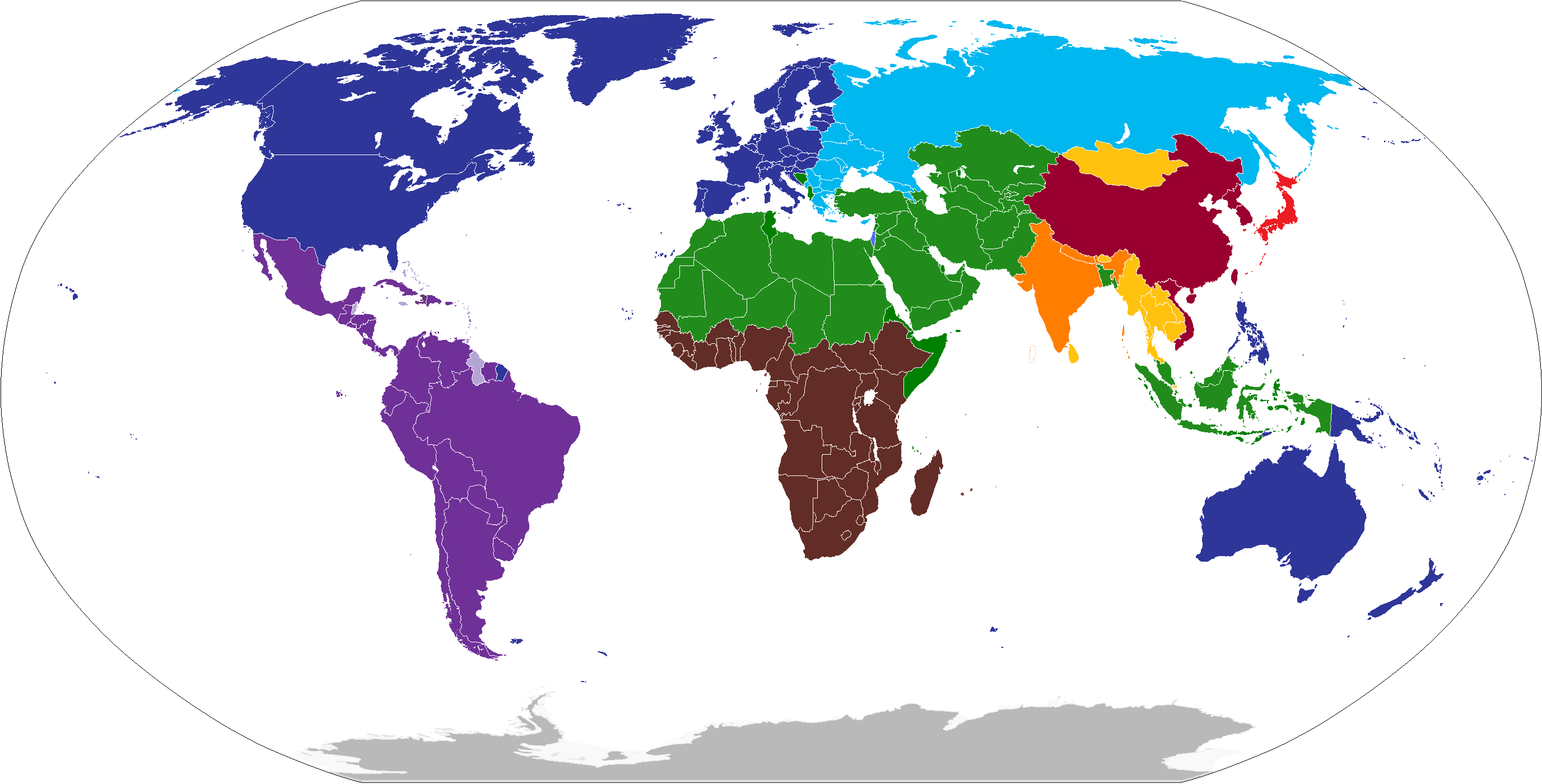
Huntington's delineation of world civilizations Western World (Western Christendom) Latin America Orthodox Civilization (Orthodox Christendom) Islamic World (Ummah) Hindu Civilization (Hindudom) Buddhist Civilizations Sinosphere (Sinic World) Japan Sub-Saharan Africa (possible civilization) Distinct entities: Anglophone Caribbean Israel

Huntington divided the world into the following major civilizations:

- Western civilization (or colloquially as Christendom), comprising the United States and Canada, Western and Central Europe, most of the Philippines, Australia, and Oceania. Whether Latin America and the former member states of the Soviet Union are included, or are instead their own separate civilizations, will be an important future consideration for those regions, according to Huntington. The traditional Western viewpoint identified Western Civilization with the Western Christian (Catholic-Protestant) countries and culture.
  - Latin American civilization, including South America (excluding Guyana, Suriname and French Guiana), Central America, Mexico, Cuba, and the Dominican Republic may be considered a part of Western civilization. Many people in South America, Central America and Mexico regard themselves as full members of Western civilization. The Southern Cone is, demographically speaking, the most Western region in Latin America.
  - Orthodox civilization, comprising Bulgaria, Cyprus, Georgia, Greece, Romania, great parts of the former Soviet Union and Yugoslavia.
    - Countries with a non-Orthodox majority are usually excluded e.g. Muslim Azerbaijan and Muslim Albania and most of Central Asia, as well as majority Muslim regions in the Balkans, Caucasus and central Russian regions such as Tatarstan and Bashkortostan, Roman Catholic Slovenia and Croatia, Protestant and Catholic Baltic states. However, Armenia is included, despite its dominant faith, the Armenian Apostolic Church, being a part of Oriental Orthodoxy rather than the Eastern Orthodox Church. Kazakhstan is also included, despite its dominant faith being Sunni Islam, though this is likely due to there being an Orthodox plurality at the time of publication.
- The Eastern world is the mix of the Islamic, Sinic, Hindu-Buddhist (Dharmic and Indic), and Japonic civilizations.
  - The Sinic civilization of China, the Koreas, Singapore, Taiwan, and Vietnam. This group also includes the Chinese diaspora, especially in relation to Southeast Asia.
  - Japan, considered a hybrid of Chinese civilization and older Altaic patterns.
  - The Buddhist cultures of Sri Lanka, Myanmar, Thailand, Laos, Cambodia; and also Tibet, Mongolia, and Bhutan, are identified as separate from other civilizations, but Huntington believes that they do not constitute a major civilization in the sense of international affairs.
  - The Hindu civilization (or colloquially as Hindudom), located chiefly in India and Nepal, and culturally adhered to by the global Indian diaspora.
  - Part of Islamic, located in Islamic countries which includes South Asian countries of Pakistan, Afghanistan and Bangladesh; and South East Asian countries of Indonesia and Malaysia.
- The Muslim world of the Greater Middle East (excluding Armenia, Cyprus, Ethiopia, Georgia, Israel, Malta and South Sudan), northern West Africa, Albania, Pakistan, Bangladesh, parts of Bosnia and Herzegovina, Brunei, Comoros, Indonesia, Malaysia, Maldives and parts of south-western Philippines.
- The civilization of Sub-Saharan Africa located in southern Africa, Middle Africa (excluding Chad), East Africa (excluding Ethiopia, the Comoros, Mauritius, and the Swahili coast of Kenya and Tanzania), Cape Verde, Ghana, the Ivory Coast, Liberia, and Sierra Leone. Considered as a possible eighth civilization by Huntington.
- South Africa is a stand-alone nation once part of the Western world, now belonging to the African world. Afrikaners and White South Africans are part of the Western world, while Black South Africans are the majority and dominate South African politics. The latter do not identify as Westerners, instead affiliating themselves with Africans. South Africa is also a Civilization state because it aims to represent the whole of the African world, including the Caribbean. Pan-Africanism is the leading ideology in South Africa; it opposes the west in the international stage.
- Instead of belonging to one of the major civilizations, Ethiopia and Haiti are labeled as Lone countries. Israel could be considered a unique state with its own civilization, Huntington writes, but one which is extremely similar to the West. Huntington also believes that the Anglophone Caribbean, former British colonies in the Caribbean, constitutes a distinct entity.
- There are also others which are considered cleft countries because they contain very large groups of people identifying with separate civilizations. Examples include Ukraine (cleft between its Eastern Rite Catholic-dominated western section and its Moscow Patriarchate Orthodox-dominated eastern section), French Guiana (cleft between Latin America, and the West), Benin, Chad, Kenya, Nigeria, Tanzania, and Togo (all cleft between Islam and Sub-Saharan Africa), Guyana and Suriname (cleft between Hindu and Sub-Saharan African), Sri Lanka and Bhutan (cleft between Hindu and Buddhist, although it can be put under the larger Dharmic civilisation), and the Philippines (cleft between Islam, in the case of south western Mindanao; Sinic, in the case of Cordillera; and the westernized Christian-majority). Sudan was also included as cleft between Islam and Sub-Saharan Africa; this division became a formal split in July 2011 following an overwhelming vote for independence by South Sudan in a January 2011 referendum.

=== Civilizational clash ===
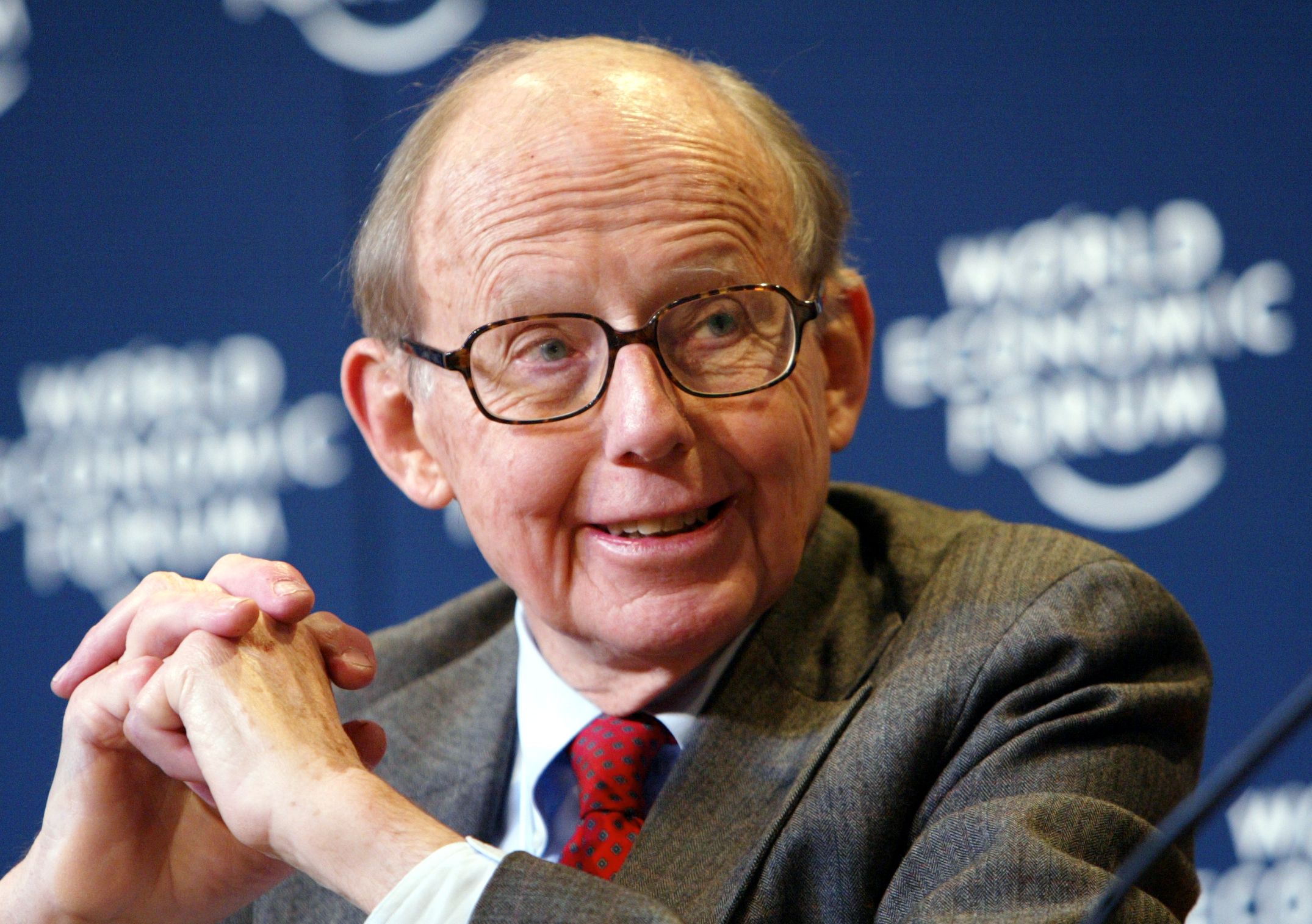
Huntington at the 2004 World Economic Forum

Huntington argues that the trends of global conflict after the end of the Cold War are increasingly appearing at these civilizational divisions. Wars such as those following the break up of Yugoslavia, in Chechnya, and between India and Pakistan were cited as evidence of inter-civilizational conflict. He also argues that the widespread Western belief in the universality of the West's values and political systems is naïve and that continued insistence on democratization and such universal norms will only further antagonize other civilizations. Huntington sees the West as reluctant to accept this because it built the international system, wrote its laws, and gave it substance in the form of the United Nations.

Huntington identifies a major shift of economic, military, and political power from the West to the other civilizations of the world, most significantly to what he identifies as the two challenger civilizations, Sinic and Islam.

In Huntington's view, East Asian Sinic civilization is culturally asserting itself and its values relative to the West due to its rapid economic growth. Specifically, he believes that China's goals are to reassert itself as the regional hegemon, and that other countries in the region will bandwagon with China due to the history of hierarchical command structures implicit in the Confucian Sinic civilization, as opposed to the individualism and pluralism valued in the West. Regional powers such as the two Koreas and Vietnam will acquiesce to Chinese demands and become more supportive of China rather than attempting to oppose it. Huntington therefore believes that the rise of China poses one of the most significant problems and the most powerful long-term threat to the West, as Chinese cultural assertion clashes with the American desire for the lack of a regional hegemony in East Asia.

Huntington argues that the Islamic civilization has experienced a massive population explosion which is fueling instability both on the borders of Islam and in its interior, where fundamentalist movements are becoming increasingly popular. Manifestations of what he terms the Islamic resurgence include the 1979 Iranian revolution and the first Gulf War. Perhaps the most controversial statement Huntington made in the Foreign Affairs article was, "Islam has bloody borders". Huntington believes this to be a real consequence of several factors, including the previously mentioned Muslim youth bulge and population growth and Islamic proximity to many civilizations including Sinic, Orthodox, Western, and African.

Huntington sees Islamic civilization as a potential ally to China, both having more revisionist goals and sharing common conflicts with other civilizations, especially the West. Specifically, he identifies common Chinese and Islamic interests in the areas of weapons proliferation, human rights, and democracy that conflict with those of the West, and feels that these are areas in which the two civilizations will cooperate.

Russia, Japan, and India are what Huntington terms swing civilizations and may favor either side. Russia, for example, clashes with the many Muslim ethnic groups on its southern border (such as Chechnya) but—according to Huntington—cooperates with Iran to avoid further Muslim-Orthodox violence in Southern Russia, and to help continue the flow of oil. Huntington argues that a Sino-Islamic connection is emerging in which China will cooperate more closely with Iran, Pakistan, and other states to augment its international position.

Huntington also argues that civilizational conflicts are particularly prevalent between Muslims and non-Muslims, identifying the bloody borders between Islamic and non-Islamic civilizations. This conflict dates back as far as the initial thrust of Islam into Europe, its eventual expulsion in the Iberian reconquista, the attacks of the Ottoman Turks on Eastern Europe and Vienna, and the European imperial division of the Islamic nations in the 1800s and 1900s.

Huntington also believes that some of the factors contributing to this conflict are that both Christianity (upon which Western civilization is based) and Islam are:

- Missionary religions, seeking conversion of others
- Universal, all-or-nothing religions, in the sense that it is believed by both sides that only their faith is the correct one
- Teleological religions, that is, that their values and beliefs represent the goals of existence and purpose in human existence.

More recent factors contributing to a Western–Islamic clash, Huntington wrote, are the Islamic Resurgence and demographic explosion in Islam, coupled with the values of Western universalism—that is, the view that all civilizations should adopt Western values—that infuriate Islamic fundamentalists. All these historical and modern factors combined, Huntington wrote briefly in his Foreign Affairs article and in much more detail in his 1996 book, would lead to a bloody clash between the Islamic and Western civilizations.

==== Causes ====
Huntington offers six explanations for why he thinks civilizations will clash:

1. Differences among civilizations are too basic in that civilizations are differentiated from each other by history, language, culture, tradition, and, most importantly, religion. These fundamental differences are the product of centuries and the foundations of different civilizations, meaning they will not be gone soon.
2. The world is becoming a smaller place. As a result, interactions across the world are increasing, which intensify civilization consciousness and the awareness of differences between civilizations and commonalities within civilizations.
3. Due to economic modernization and social change, people are separated from longstanding local identities. Instead, religion has replaced this gap, which provides a basis for identity and commitment that transcends national boundaries and unites civilizations.
4. The growth of civilization-consciousness is enhanced by the dual role of the West. On the one hand, the West is at a peak of power. At the same time, a return-to-the-roots phenomenon is occurring among non-Western civilizations. A West at the peak of its power confronts non-Western countries that increasingly have the desire, the will and the resources to shape the world in non-Western ways.
5. Cultural characteristics and differences are less mutable and hence less easily compromised and resolved than political and economic ones.
6. Economic regionalism is increasing. Successful economic regionalism will reinforce civilization-consciousness. Economic regionalism may succeed only when it is rooted in a common civilization.

==== The West versus 'the Rest' ====
Huntington suggests that in the future the central axis of world politics tends to be the conflict between Western and non-Western civilizations, in Stuart Hall's phrase, the conflict between the West and 'the Rest'. He offers three forms of general and fundamental actions that non-Western civilization can take in response to Western countries.

1. Non-Western countries can attempt to achieve isolation in order to preserve their own values and protect themselves from Western invasion. However, Huntington argues that the costs of this action are high and only a few states can pursue it.
2. According to the theory of bandwagoning, non-Western countries can join and accept Western values.
3. Non-Western countries can make an effort to balance Western power through modernization. They can develop economic/military power and cooperate with other non-Western countries against the West while still preserving their own values and institutions. Huntington believes that the increasing power of non-Western civilizations in international society will make the West begin to develop a better understanding of the cultural fundamentals underlying other civilizations. Therefore, Western civilization will cease to be regarded as universal but different civilizations will learn to coexist and join to shape the future world.

==== Core state and fault line conflicts ====
In Huntington's view, intercivilizational conflict manifests itself in two forms: fault line conflicts and core state conflicts.

Fault line conflicts are on a local level and occur between adjacent states belonging to different civilizations or within states that are home to populations from different civilizations.

Core state conflicts are on a global level between the major states of different civilizations. Core state conflicts can arise out of fault line conflicts when core states become involved.

These conflicts may result from a number of causes, such as: relative influence or power (military or economic), discrimination against people from a different civilization, intervention to protect kinsmen in a different civilization, or different values and culture, particularly when one civilization attempts to impose its values on people of a different civilization.

==== Modernization, Westernization, and torn countries ====
Japan, China and the Four Asian Tigers have modernized in many respects while maintaining traditional or authoritarian societies which distinguish them from the West. Some of these countries have clashed with the West and some have not.

Perhaps the ultimate example of non-Western modernization is Russia, the core state of the Orthodox civilization. Huntington argues that Russia is primarily a non-Western state although he seems to agree that it shares a considerable amount of cultural ancestry with the modern West. According to Huntington, the West is distinguished from Orthodox Christian countries by its experience of the Renaissance, Reformation, the Enlightenment; by overseas colonialism rather than contiguous expansion and colonialism; and by the infusion of Classical culture through ancient Greece rather than through the continuous trajectory of the Byzantine Empire.

Huntington refers to countries that are seeking to affiliate with another civilization as torn countries. Turkey, whose political leadership has systematically tried to Westernize the country since the 1920s, is his chief example. Turkey's history, culture, and traditions are derived from Islamic civilization, but Turkey's elite, beginning with Mustafa Kemal Atatürk who took power as first President in 1923, imposed Western institutions and dress, embraced the Latin alphabet, joined NATO, and has sought to join the European Union.

Mexico and Russia are also considered to be torn by Huntington. He also gives the example of Australia as a country torn between its Western civilizational heritage and its growing economic engagement with Asia.

According to Huntington, a torn country must meet three requirements to redefine its civilizational identity. Its political and economic elite must support the move. Second, the public must be willing to accept the redefinition. Third, the elites of the civilization that the torn country is trying to join must accept the country.

The book claims that to date no torn country has successfully redefined its civilizational identity, this mostly due to the elites of the host civilization refusing to accept the torn country, though if Turkey gained membership in the European Union, it has been noted that many of its people would support Westernization, as in the following quote by EU Minister Egemen Bağış: "This is what Europe needs to do: they need to say that when Turkey fulfills all requirements, Turkey will become a member of the EU on date X. Then, we will regain the Turkish public opinion support in one day." If this were to happen, it would, according to Huntington, be the first to redefine its civilizational identity.

== Influence ==
The clash of civilizations theory made a substantial scholarly and policy impact. It has been widely cited, both in academic studies, and by various political figures, with studies documenting specific influences of the clash of civilizations theory. The war on terror has been theorized as both an accurate prediction of the theory, and as a result of both Western and Islamist leaders adopting the premise of a clash between their cultures. The theory has been described as a paradigm that is particularly prevalent in right wing politics across Western democracies, and was viewed as part of the Donald Trump 2016 presidential campaign. The theory has been used to describe right-wing ideology in Israel, particularly to justify clashes between Jews and Palestinians. It had been observed as influencing the worldview of Israeli Prime Minister Benjamin Netanyahu on Islam. The clash of civilizations had also influenced Viktor Orbán in his rejection of multi-culturalism and in adding restrictions for Muslim immigration.

== Criticism ==
The book has been criticized by various academic writers, who have empirically, historically, logically, or ideologically challenged its claims. Political scientist Paul Musgrave writes that Clash of Civilization "enjoys great cachet among the sort of policymaker who enjoys name-dropping Sun Tzu, but few specialists in international relations rely on it or even cite it approvingly. Bluntly, Clash has not proven to be a useful or accurate guide to understanding the world." Other books, written for the general public, similarly challenge Huntington's contentious claims. For example, in his work Identity and Violence: The Illusion of Destiny, The Nobel laureate Amartya Sen advances several critiques of Huntington's main concept of an inevitable Clash along civilizational lines. He argues that violence occurs when individuals see each other as having a singular affiliation (e.g., Hindu, Muslim, Christian), as opposed to multiple affiliations: e.g., Hindu, woman, housewife, mother, artist, daughter, member of a particular socio-economic class etc. In this sense, and to the detriment of civilization distinctiveness, it is argued that all of these dimensions can, and should be a source of a personal identity.

Moreover, in an article explicitly referring to Huntington, the same scholar Amartya Sen (1999) argues that "diversity is a feature of most cultures in the world. Western civilization is no exception. The practice of democracy that has won out in the modern West is largely a result of a consensus that has emerged since the Enlightenment and the Industrial Revolution, and particularly in the last century or so. To read in this a historical commitment of the West—over the millennia—to democracy, and then to contrast it with non-Western traditions (treating each as monolithic) would be a great mistake."

In his 2003 book Terror and Liberalism, Paul Berman argues that distinct cultural boundaries do not exist in the present day. He argues there is "no Islamic civilization nor a Western civilization", and that the evidence for a civilization clash is not convincing, especially when considering relationships such as that between the United States and Saudi Arabia. In addition, he cites the fact that many Islamic extremists spent a significant amount of time living or studying in the Western world. According to Berman, conflict arises because of philosophical beliefs various groups share (or do not share), regardless of cultural or religious identity.

Timothy Garton Ash objects to the "extreme cultural determinism... crude to the point of parody" of Huntington's idea that Catholic and Protestant Europe is headed for democracy, but that Orthodox Christian and Islamic Europe must accept dictatorship.

In November 2001, Noam Chomsky said the concept of the clash of civilizations was merely a pretext to continue the same aggressive foreign policy as during the Cold War, only with new antagonists in place of the Soviet Union. He said that the concept has allowed the US to ignore its support for "Islamic fundamentalist" Saudi Arabia.

Nathan J. Robinson criticizes Huntington's thesis as inconsistent. He notes that according to Huntington, "Spanish-speaking Catholic-majority Spain is West, while Spanish-speaking Catholic-majority Mexico is not part of Western civilization, and instead belongs with Brazil as part of Latin American civilization." Robinson concludes, "If you look at the map and think these divisions make sense, which you might, it is because what you are mostly seeing here is a map of prejudices. [Huntington] indeed shows how a lot of people think of the world, especially in America."

=== Opposing concepts ===
The clash of civilizations has been criticized as promoting an ideologically conservative attempt to maintain the imperial gains from Western colonialism. Edward Said issued a response to Huntington's thesis in his 2001 article, The Clash of Ignorance. Said argues that Huntington's categorization of the world's fixed civilizations "omits the dynamic interdependency and interaction of culture". A longtime critic of the Huntingtonian paradigm, and an outspoken proponent of Arab issues, Said (2004) also argues that the clash of civilizations thesis is an example of "the purest invidious racism, a sort of parody of Hitlerian science directed today against Arabs and Muslims" (p. 293).

Financial Times columnist Janan Ganesh argued in 2025 that Huntington's theory had fared poorly on recent evidence, as the most significant conflicts have occurred within and not between Huntington's civilizational groupings. Whereas Huntington had predicted conflict to occur between 'civilizations' at the borders between them, the most protracted and deadly wars – Ganesh highlighted the Russo-Ukrainian war, the Syrian civil war, the Sudanese civil war and the Yemeni civil war – have occurred between groups belonging to similar cultures and religions. Similarly, where Huntington said that Islam had "bloody borders", most of the victims of Islamic extremism have been Muslims. Ganesh noted the reliability of cross-civilizational partnerships between Russia and China and between Japan and Europe, which he said stand in contrast to bitter intra-civilizational rivalries such as the Iran–Saudi Arabia proxy war and the potential for conflict between China and Taiwan. It is "the doubter, the apostate and the schismatic" who receive the most hostility, Ganesh wrote. He suggested that a similar logic explained the Trump administration's preference for countries such as Russia and Saudi Arabia over culturally closer nations in Europe. Ganesh stated that the Israel–Palestine conflict is notable for being an exception that fits Huntington's model. He concluded that the often overlooked 2008 Russo-Georgian War was a stronger symbolic inauguration of the current era than the September 11 attacks.

In 21 Lessons for the 21st Century, Yuval Noah Harari called the clash of civilizations a misleading thesis. He wrote that Islamic fundamentalism is more of a threat to a global civilization, rather than a confrontation with the West. He also argued that talking about civilizations using analogies from evolutionary biology is wrong.

In his 1993 article, Huntington wrote that "If civilization is what counts … the likelihood of violence between Ukrainians and Russians should be low. They are two Slavic, primarily Orthodox peoples who have had close relationships with each other for centuries". In 2022, Russia invaded Ukraine, having annexed Crimea in 2014 and then supported separatists in the War in Donbas (2014–2022).

==== Intermediate Region ====
Huntington's geopolitical model, especially the structures for North Africa and Eurasia, is largely derived from the Intermediate Region geopolitical model first formulated by Dimitri Kitsikis and published in 1978. The Intermediate Region, which spans the Adriatic Sea and the Indus River, is neither Western nor Eastern (at least, with respect to the Far East) but is considered distinct. Concerning this region, Huntington departs from Kitsikis contending that a civilizational fault line exists between the two dominant yet differing religions (Eastern Orthodoxy and Sunni Islam), hence a dynamic of external conflict. However, Kitsikis establishes an integrated civilization comprising these two peoples along with those belonging to the less dominant religions of Shia Islam, Alevism, and Judaism. They have a set of mutual cultural, social, economic and political views and norms which radically differ from those in the West and the Far East. In the Intermediate Region, therefore, one cannot speak of a civilizational clash or external conflict, but rather an internal conflict, not for cultural domination, but for political succession. This has been successfully demonstrated by documenting the rise of Christianity from the Hellenized Roman Empire, the rise of the Islamic caliphates from the Christianized Roman Empire and the rise of Ottoman Empire from the Islamic caliphates and the Christianized Roman Empire.

==== Dialogue Among Civilizations ====
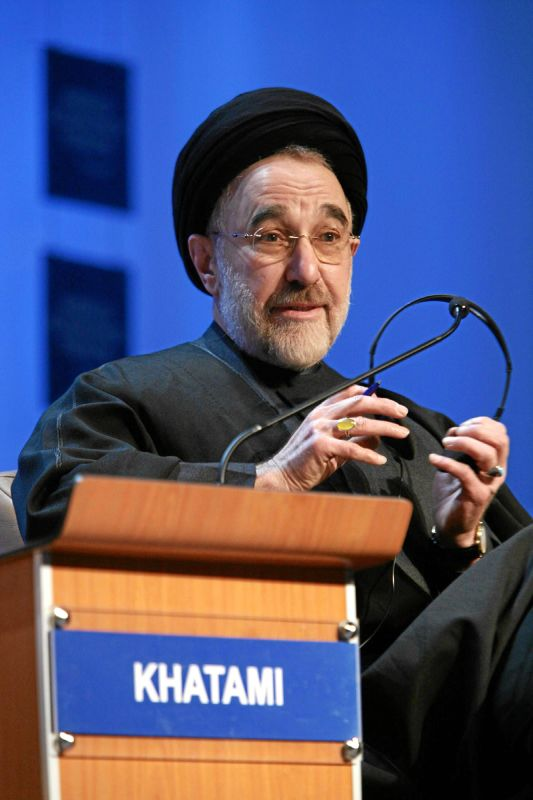
Mohammad Khatami, reformist president of Iran (in office 1997–2005), introduced the theory of Dialogue Among Civilizations as a response to Huntington's theory.

In recent years, the theory of Dialogue Among Civilizations, a response to Huntington's Clash of Civilizations, has become the center of some international attention. The concept was originally coined by Austrian philosopher Hans Köchler in an essay on cultural identity (1972). In a letter to UNESCO, Köchler had earlier proposed that the cultural organization of the United Nations should take up the issue of a "dialogue between different civilizations" (dialogue entre les différentes civilisations). In 2001, Mohammad Khatami, then Iranian president, introduced the concept at the global level. At his initiative, the United Nations proclaimed the year 2001 as the "United Nations Year of Dialogue among Civilizations".

The Alliance of Civilizations (AOC) initiative was proposed at the 59th General Assembly of the United Nations in 2005 by the Spanish Prime Minister, José Luis Rodríguez Zapatero and co-sponsored by the Turkish Prime Minister Recep Tayyip Erdoğan. The initiative is intended to galvanize collective action across diverse societies to combat extremism, to overcome cultural and social barriers between mainly the Western and predominantly Muslim worlds, and to reduce the tensions and polarization between societies which differ in religious and cultural values.

== See also ==
=== Other civilizational models ===
- Eurasianism, a Russian geopolitical concept based on the civilization of Eurasia
- Intermediate Region
- Islamo-Christian Civilization
- Pan-Turkism

=== Individuals ===
- Richard Bulliet
- Jacob Burckhardt
- Niall Ferguson
- Dimitri Kitsikis
- Feliks Koneczny
- Carroll Quigley
- Oswald Spengler

=== Other ===
- Balkanization
- Civilizing mission
- Cold War II
- Criticism of multiculturalism
- Cultural relativism
- Divisions of the world in Islam
- Eastern Party
- Fault line war
- Global policeman
- Inglehart–Welzel cultural map of the world
- International relations
- Opposition to immigration
- Occidentalism
- Orientalism
  - Oriental Despotism
- Potential superpowers
- Protracted social conflict
- Religious pluralism
- East-West Cultural Debate

== Bibliography ==
- Ankerl, Guy (2000). Global communication without universal civilization. INU societal research. Vol. 1: Coexisting contemporary civilizations: Arabo-Muslim, Bharati, Chinese, and Western. Geneva: INU Press. ISBN 978-2-88155-004-1.
- Barbé, Philippe, L'Anti-Choc des Civilisations: Méditations Méditerranéennes, Editions de l'Aube, 2006, ISBN 978-2-7526-0208-4
- Barber, Benjamin R., Jihad vs. McWorld, Hardcover: Crown, 1995, ISBN 0-8129-2350-2; Paperback: Ballantine Books, 1996, ISBN 0-345-38304-4
- Blankley, Tony, The West's Last Chance: Will We Win the Clash of Civilizations?, Washington, D.C., Regnery Publishing, Inc., 2005 ISBN 0-89526-015-8
- Harris, Lee, Civilization and Its Enemies: The Next Stage of History, New York, The Free Press, 2004 ISBN 0-7432-5749-9
- Harrison, Lawrence E. and Samuel P. Huntington (eds.), Culture Matters: How Values Shape Human Progress, New York, Basic Books, 2001 ISBN 0-465-03176-5
- Harvey, David (2000). Spaces of Hope. Edinburgh, UK: Edinburgh University Press. pp. 79–80. ISBN 978-0-7486-1269-7.
- Haynes, Jeffrey, ed. A Quarter Century of the" clash of Civilizations". Routledge, 2021. ISBN 9781000383812
- Huntington, Samuel P., The Clash of Civilizations?, in "Foreign Affairs", vol. 72, no. 3, Summer 1993, pp. 22–49
- Huntington, Samuel P., The Clash of Civilizations and the Remaking of World Order, New York, Simon & Schuster, 1996 ISBN 0-684-84441-9
- Huntington, Samuel P. (ed.), The Clash of Civilizations?: The Debate, New York, Foreign Affairs, 1996 ISBN 0-87609-164-8
- Kepel, Gilles, Bad Moon Rising: a chronicle of the Middle East today, London, Saqi Books, 2003 ISBN 0-86356-303-1
- Köchler, Hans (ed.), Civilizations: Conflict or Dialogue?, Vienna, International Progress Organization, 1999 ISBN 3-900704-18-X (Google Print)
- Köchler, Hans, After September 11, 2001: Clash of Civilizations or Dialogue? University of the Philippines, Manila, 2002
- Köchler, Hans, The "Clash of Civilizations": Perception and Reality in the Context of Globalization and International Power Politics, Tbilisi (Georgia), 2004
- Pera, Marcello and Joseph Ratzinger (Pope Benedict XVI), Senza radici: Europa, Relativismo, Cristianesimo, Islam [transl.: Without Roots: The West, Relativism, Christianity, Islam, Philadelphia, Pennsylvania, Perseus Books Group, 2006 ISBN 0-465-00634-5], Milano, Mondadori, 2004 ISBN 88-04-54474-0
- Peters, Ralph, Fighting for the Future: Will America Triumph?, Mechanicsburg, Pennsylvania, Stackpole Books, 1999 ISBN 0-8117-0651-6
- Potter, Robert (2011), 'Recalcitrant Interdependence', Thesis, Flinders University
- Sacks, Jonathan, The Dignity of Difference: How to Avoid the Clash of Civilizations, London, Continuum, 2002 ISBN 0-8264-6397-5
- Toft, Monica Duffy, The Geography of Ethnic Violence: Identity, Interests, and the Indivisibility of Territory, Princeton, New Jersey, Princeton University Press, 2003 ISBN 0-691-11354-8
- Tusicisny, Andrej, "Civilizational Conflicts: More Frequent, Longer, and Bloodier?", in Journal of Peace Research, vol. 41, no. 4, 2004, pp. 485–498 (available online)
- Van Creveld, Martin, The Transformation of War, New York & London, The Free Press, 1991 ISBN 0-02-933155-2
- Venn, Couze "Clash of Civilisations", in Prem Poddar et al., Historical Companion to Postcolonial Literatures—Continental Europe and its Empires, Edinburgh University Press, 2008.
