= Bernadette Kunambi =

Tanzanian politician

Bernadette or Bernadeta Nemphombe Kunambi (born 2 June 1934) was a Tanzanian politician. She was National General Secretary of the YWCA, Chair of the Tanganyika Council of Women, and a Member of Parliament.

== Life ==
Bernadette Kunambi was born in Morogoro. She was educated at Mhonda Girls School from 1945 to 1948.

She married Patrick Kunambi (1916-2011), a Chief and TANU co-founder who was best friends with Julius Nyerere.

A Roman Catholic, Kunambi participated in the 1961 East Frican Lay Apostolate Meeting hosted by Bishop Blomjous at his Social Training Centre in Nyegezi. In 1969 she participated in the Seminar Study Year, a program to consider the Catholic Church in Tanzania in the light of Vatican II.

In 1969 Julius Nyerere appointed Kunambi, who had previously been working as a teacher, as Area Commissioner for Kilosa District.

In 1980 Kunambi criticized the church for its structural inequality and the ambiguity of its stance on women:

in Africa, the woman as a human being [...] is often puzzled and even confused by Christianity as presented to her. What is puzzling is not the Bible as a whole, for what is in the Bible is very close to the traditional way of life in Africa today. It is not even the Gospel, for the message of our Lord is simple and straightforward: it is love and all that constitutes charity. The problem for women [...] is the set up of the CHurch as brought to Africa. It is the problem of finding herself at a loss to know what the place of the woman is in the Church. The Church teaches equality of all men (which includes women) before God, and yet the woman often finds herself a second class, if not a third class citizen in the Church.

== Works ==
- 'The Place of Women in the Christian Community', in Alyward Shorter (ed.) African Christian Spirituality, London: Chapman 1978, pp. 11–20
