= Fault line war =

A fault line war is one that takes place between two or more identity groups (usually religious or ethnic) from different civilizations. It is a communal conflict between states or groups from different civilizations that has become violent. These wars may take place between states, between nongovernmental groups, or between states and nongovernmental groups. Most often, the issue in a fault line war is often over territory, but it could also be over the control of people. Such wars within states may involve groups that are predominantly located in different territories or groups that are intermixed. In the latter, violence often erupts periodically.

The issue at stake in a fault line war is very symbolic for at least one of the groups involved. Because the issue is one of fundamental identity, these wars are longer and more difficult to resolve than conventional warfare. And even when agreements are reached, the groups are rarely fully satisfied, and often the hatred is only dissolved through genocide.

The concept of a fault line war was first introduced by military theorist Samuel Huntington in his 1996 book The Clash of Civilizations. To Huntington, fault line wars most often erupt between states which span civilizations; he calls these "cleft states." Huntington cites the Bosnian War as an example of a fault line war, noting differences of religion as a primary catalyst for conflict. In his critique of The Clash of Civilizations, Florian Bieber notes Huntington's oversimplification of the causes of the Balkan conflict and his apparent dismissal of nationalism as a factor at all.

== See also ==
- Balkanization
- Protracted social conflict
- The Clash of Civilizations
