= Center for Asymmetric Warfare =

The Center for Asymmetric Warfare (CAW) was established in 1999. CAW is a U.S. Navy entity dedicated to supporting U.S. military forces, as well as local, state, and federal organizations, in countering and controlling the effects of asymmetric warfare, and in support of the global war on terrorism.

== Naval Postgraduate School ==
In 2008, the CAW joined the Naval Postgraduate School as a satellite division, located at NAS Point Mugu, CA and is aligned under the Research Department. As part of the Research Department, the CAW has the flexibility to operate across the 4 institutes and 4 schools that make up NPS. It also allows the CAW to capitalize on the expertise of their many distinguished alumni, faculty and students that can perform as interns.

== CAW capabilities ==
- Training: Recognized subject matter experts develop and deliver a wide variety of student-based training courses, including the National Incident Management System (NIMS), the Incident Command System (ICS) and Defense Support of Civil authorities (DSCA). The CAW also provides training in specific areas of the exercise design process, such as, identification of exercise requirements and development of the Exercise Master Scenario Events List (MSEL). In particular, CAW has implemented NASA touchscreen tabletop technology and used it in its training.
- Exercise Design Facilitation of multiple and diverse response and support agencies with different operational characteristics and cultures to identify the procedural, physical and logistics needs for the successful execution of the exercise. This leads to the development of complex but realistic scenario-based challenges that meet the goals and objectives of the participating agencies.
- Exercise Delivery, such as managing of exercise activities, including set up of the environment
- Exercise Documentation including training, design, control, execution, instructional aides, and after action documents.
- Resources Personnel, products, and/or locations that enhance the realism of the scenario and the learning experience, ranging from:
  - Simulated weapons and explosives
  - Large scale props such as ships, aircraft and buildings
  - Opposition forces
  - Simulated casualties
  - Contaminated victims
  - Video production to support the exercise scenario or capture and document exercise activities
  - Press/media representatives
  - Fast Patrol Craft, CAW-1.
