= Asymmetric warfare =

War between belligerents whose relative military power differs significantly

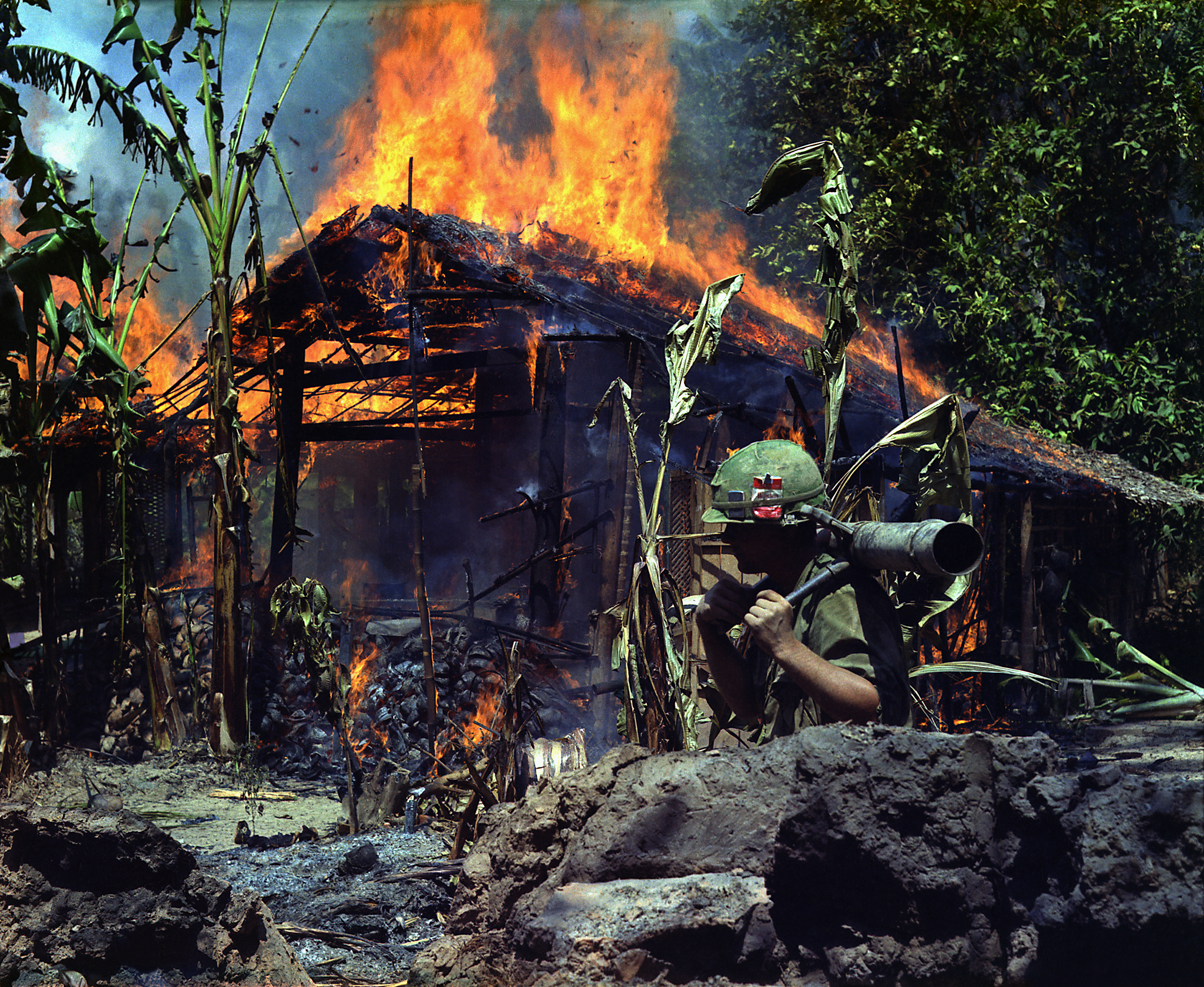
A Viet Cong base camp being burned during the Vietnam War. An American private first class (PFC) stands by.

Asymmetric warfare (or asymmetric engagement) is a type of war between belligerents whose relative military power, strategy or tactics differ significantly. This type of warfare often involves insurgents, terrorist groups, or resistance militias operating within territory mostly controlled by the superior force.

Asymmetrical warfare can also describe a conflict in which belligerents' material resources are uneven, and consequently, each may attempt to exploit each other's relative weaknesses. Such struggles often involve unconventional warfare, with the weaker side attempting to use strategy to offset deficiencies in the quantity or quality of their forces and equipment. Such strategies may not necessarily be militarized. This is in contrast to symmetrical warfare, where two powers have comparable military power, resources, and rely on similar tactics and victory standards.

Conventional militaries consider asymmetric warfare a form of irregular warfare – conflicts in which nominally weaker adversaries are not regular military forces of nation-states. For military analysts the term is most often used as an umbrella term to describe what is also called guerrilla warfare, insurgency, counterinsurgency, rebellion, terrorism, and counterterrorism.

== Definition and differences ==
The popularity of the term dates from Andrew J. R. Mack's 1975 article "Why Big Nations Lose Small Wars" in World Politics, in which "asymmetric" referred to a significant disparity in relative power between opposing actors in a conflict. "Power," in this sense, is broadly understood to mean material power, such as a large army, sophisticated weapons, an advanced economy, and so on. Mack's analysis was largely ignored in its day, but the end of the Cold War sparked renewed interest among academics. By the late 1990s, new research building on Mack's work was beginning to mature; after 9/11, the U.S. military began once again to grapple with asymmetric warfare strategy.

Since 2004, the discussion of asymmetric warfare has been complicated by the tendency of academic and military officials to use the term in different ways, as well as by its close association with guerrilla warfare, insurgency, terrorism, counterinsurgency, and counterterrorism.

Academic authors tend to focus on explaining two puzzles in asymmetric conflict. First, if "power" determines victory, there must be reasons why weaker actors decide to fight more powerful actors. Key explanations include:

- Weaker actors may have secret weapons.
- Weaker actors may have powerful allies.
- Stronger actors are unable to make threats credible.
- The demands of a stronger actor are extreme.
- The weaker actor must consider its regional rivals when responding to threats from powerful actors.

Second, if "power," as generally understood, leads to victory in war, then there must be an explanation for why the "weak" can defeat the "strong." Key explanations include:

- Strategic interaction.
- Willingness of the weak to suffer more or bear higher costs.
- External support of weak actors.
- Reluctance to escalating violence on the part of strong actors.
- Internal group dynamics.
- Inflated strong actor war aims.
- Evolution of asymmetric rivals' attitudes towards time.

Asymmetric conflicts include interstate and civil wars, and over the past two hundred years, have generally been won by strong actors. Since 1950, however, weak actors have won the majority of asymmetric conflicts. In asymmetric conflicts conflict escalation can be rational for one side.

== Strategic basis ==
In most conventional warfare, the belligerents deploy forces of a similar type, and the outcome can be predicted by the quantity or quality of the opposing forces, for example, better command and control of theirs (c2). There are times when this is the case, and conventional forces are not easily compared, making it difficult for opposing sides to engage. An example of this is the standoff between the continental land forces of the French Army and the maritime forces of the United Kingdom's Royal Navy during the French Revolutionary and Napoleonic Wars. In the words of Admiral Jervis during the campaigns of 1801, "I do not say, my Lords, that the French will not come. I say only they will not come by sea", and a confrontation that Napoleon Bonaparte described as that between the elephant and the whale.

== Tactical basis ==
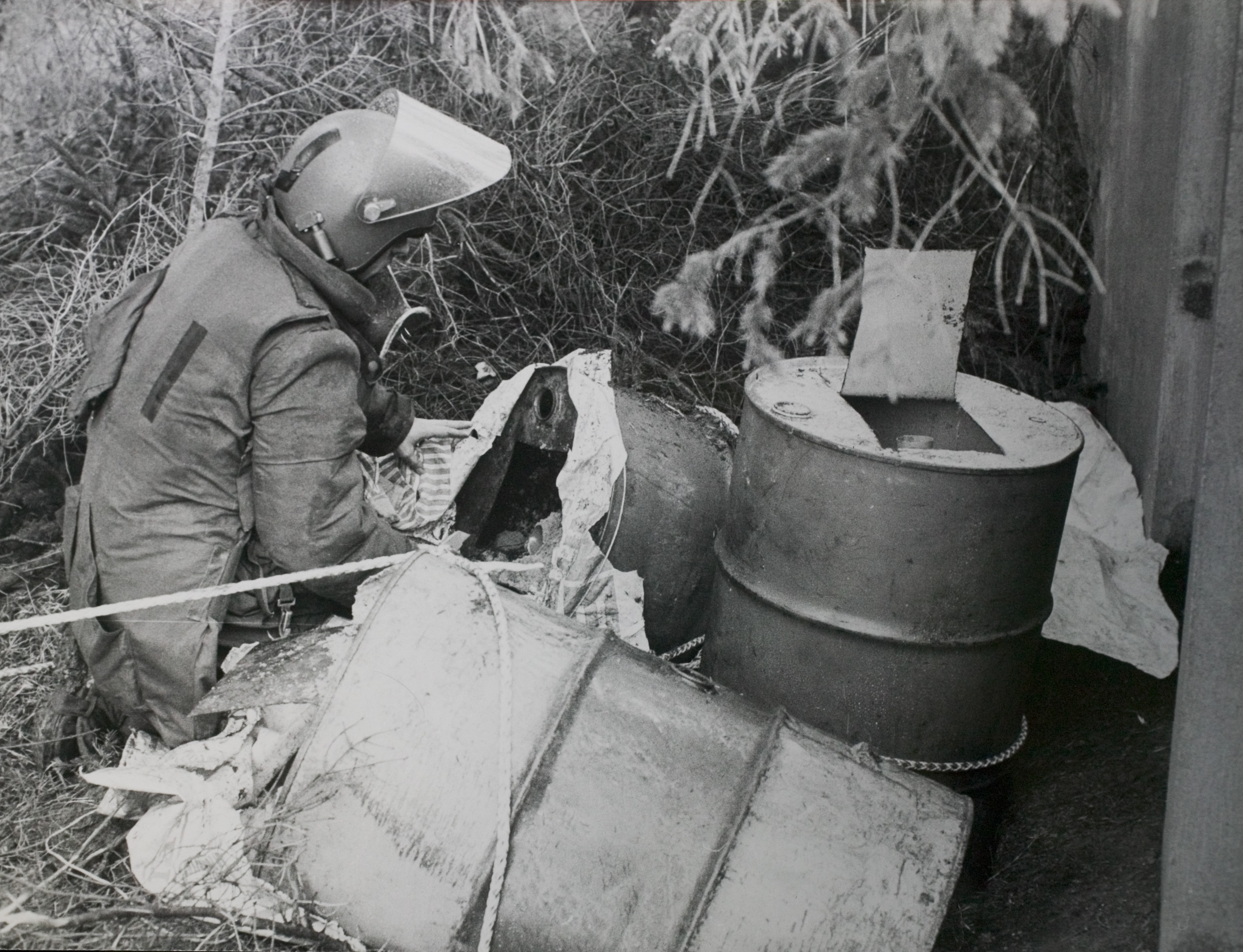
Oil-drum roadside IED in Northern Ireland removed from culvert in 1984

The tactical success of asymmetric warfare is dependent on at least some of the following assumptions:

- One side can have a technological advantage that outweighs the numerical advantage of the enemy; the English longbow at the Battle of Crécy is an example.
- Technological superiority usually is cancelled by the more vulnerable infrastructure, which can be targeted with devastating results. Destruction of multiple electric lines, roads, or water supply systems in highly populated areas could devastate the economy and morale. In contrast, the weaker side may not have these structures at all.
- Training, tactics, and technology can prove decisive and allow a smaller force to overcome a much larger one. For example, for several centuries, the Greek hoplite's (heavy infantry) use of phalanx made them far superior to their enemies. The Battle of Thermopylae, which also involved good use of terrain, is a well-known example.
- If the inferior power is in a position of self-defense, i.e., under attack or occupation, it may be possible to use unconventional tactics, such as hit-and-run and selective battles in which the superior power is weaker, as an effective means of harassment without violating the laws of war. Perhaps the classic historical examples of this doctrine may be found in the American Revolutionary War and movements in World War II, such as the French Resistance and Soviet and Yugoslav partisans. Against democratic aggressor nations, this strategy can be used to play on the electorate's patience with the conflict (as in the Vietnam War, and others since), provoking protests, and consequent disputes among elected legislators.
- However, if the weaker power is in an aggressive position or turns to tactics prohibited by the laws of war (jus in bello), its success depends on the superior power's refraining from like tactics. For example, the law of land warfare prohibits the use of a flag of truce or marked medical vehicles as cover for an attack or ambush. Still, an asymmetric combatant using this prohibited tactic to its advantage depends on the superior power's obedience to the corresponding law. Similarly, warfare laws prohibit combatants from using civilian settlements, populations or facilities as military bases, but when an inferior force uses this tactic, it depends on the premise that the superior one will respect the law that the other is violating, and will not attack that civilian target, or if they do the propaganda advantage will outweigh the material loss.

=== Terrorism ===
There are two opposing viewpoints on the relationship between asymmetric warfare and terrorism. In the modern context, asymmetric warfare is increasingly considered a component of fourth generation warfare. When practiced outside the laws of war, it is often defined as terrorism, though rarely by its practitioners or their supporters. The other view is that asymmetric warfare does not coincide with terrorism.

== Use of terrain ==
Terrain that limits mobility, such as forests and mountains, can be used as a force multiplier by the smaller force and as a force inhibitor against the larger one, especially one operating far from its logistical base. Such terrain is called difficult terrain. Urban areas, though generally having good transport access, provide innumerable ready-made defensible positions with simple escape routes and can also become rough terrain if prolonged combat fills the streets with rubble:

The contour of the land is an aid to the army, sizing up opponents to determine victory and assessing dangers and distance. "Those who do battle without knowing these will lose."

— Sun Tzu, The Art of War

The guerrillas must move amongst the people as a fish swims in the sea.

— Mao Zedong

In the 12th century, irregulars known as the Assassins were successful in the Nizari Ismaili state. The "state" consisted of fortresses (such as the Alamut Castle) built on strategic mountaintops and highlands with difficult access, surrounded by hostile lands. The Assassins developed tactics to eliminate high-value targets, threatening their security, including the Crusaders.

In the American Revolutionary War, Patriot Lieutenant Colonel Francis Marion, known as the "Swamp Fox," took advantage of irregular tactics, interior lines, and the wilderness of colonial South Carolina to hinder larger British regular forces.

Yugoslav Partisans, starting as small detachments around mountain villages in 1941, fought the German and other Axis occupation forces, successfully taking advantage of the rough terrain to survive despite their small numbers. Over the next four years, they slowly forced their enemies back, recovering population centers and resources, eventually growing into the regular Yugoslav Army.

The Vietnam war is a classical example of the use of terrain to fight an asymmetrical war, The North Vietnamese army (NVA) and Viet Cong (VC) used the forested and mountainous terrain of Vietnam to allow for effective concealment of troop movements in spite of superior enemy air power. This allowed supplying troops to be possible without incurring heavy losses from American airstrikes, who could not effectively identify or track their movements from the air. This was true to such an extent that the US employed defoliation methods such as the use of Agent Orange and extensive Napalm use to make forested areas visible from the air. The NVA and VC also used intricate tunnel systems, such as the Củ Chi tunnels, which enabled them to move undetected, store supplies, and evade U.S. search-and-destroy missions.

== Role of civilians ==
Civilians can play a vital role in determining the outcome of an asymmetric war. In such conflicts, when it is easy for insurgents to assimilate into the population quickly after an attack, tips on the timing or location of insurgent activity can severely undermine the resistance. An information-central framework, in which civilians are seen primarily as sources of strategic information rather than resources, provides a paradigm to understand better the dynamics of such conflicts where civilian information-sharing is vital. The framework assumes that:

- The consequential action of non-combatants (civilians) is information sharing rather than supplying resources, recruits, or shelter to combatants.
- Information can be shared anonymously without endangering the civilian who relays it.

Given the additional assumption that the larger or dominant force is the government, the framework suggests the following implications:

- Civilians receive services from government and rebel forces as an incentive to share valuable information.
- Rebel violence can be reduced if the government provides services.
- Provision of security and services are complementary in reducing violence.
- Civilian casualties reduce civilian support to the perpetrating group.
- Provision of information is strongly correlated with the level of anonymity that can be ensured.

A survey of the empirical literature on conflict, does not provide conclusive evidence on the claims. But the framework gives a starting point to explore the role of civilian information sharing in asymmetric warfare.

== War by proxy ==
Where asymmetric warfare is carried out (generally covertly) by allegedly non-governmental actors who are connected to or sympathetic to a particular nation's (the "state actor's") interest, it may be deemed war by proxy. This is typically done to give the state actor deniability. The deniability can be crucial to keep the state actor from being tainted by the actions, to allow the state actor to negotiate in apparent good faith by claiming they are not responsible for the actions of parties who are merely sympathizers, or to avoid being accused of belligerent actions or war crimes. If proof emerges of the true extent of the state actor's involvement, this strategy can backfire; for example, see Iran-contra affair and Philip Agee.

== Examples ==
=== American Indian Wars ===
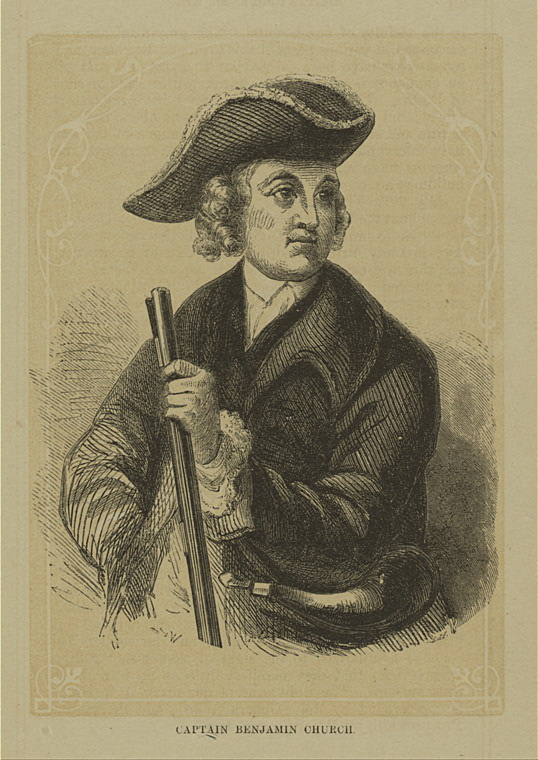
Colonel Benjamin Church (1639–1718) from the Plymouth Colony, father of Unconventional warfare, American Ranging, and Rangers

Benjamin Church designed his force primarily to emulate Native American patterns of war. Toward this end, Church endeavored to learn to fight like Native Americans from Native Americans. Americans became rangers exclusively under the tutelage of the Native American allies. (Until the end of the colonial period, rangers depended on Native Americans as both allies and teachers.)

Church developed a special full-time unit mixing white colonists selected for frontier skills with friendly Native Americans to carry out offensive strikes against hostile Native Americans in terrain where normal militia units were ineffective. Church paid special care to outfitting, supplying and instructing his troops in ways inspired by indigenous methods of warfare and ways of living. He emphasized the adoption of indigenous techniques, which prioritized small, mobile and flexible units which used the countryside for cover, in lieu of massed frontal assaults by large formations. Benjamin Church is sometimes referred to as the father of Unconventional warfare.

=== American Revolutionary War ===
From its initiation, the American Revolutionary War was, necessarily, a showcase for asymmetric techniques. In the 1920s, Harold Murdock of Boston attempted to solve the puzzle of the first shots fired at Lexington, Massachusetts, and came to the suspicion that the few dozen American minutemen who gathered before sunrise to await the arrival of a column of British regulars were sent to provoke an incident which could be used for Patriot propaganda purposes. The return of the British column to Boston following search operations at Concord, Massachusetts, was subject to constant skirmishing attacks by minutemen gathered from communities all along the route, making maximum use of the terrain (particularly, trees and stone field walls) to overcome the limitations of their weapons – muskets with an effective range of only about 50–70 meters. Throughout the war, skirmishing tactics against enemy forces on the move continued to be a key factor in American victories, particularly in the western theater of the American Revolutionary War.

During the Revolutionary War, both British and American warships engaged in asymmetric warfare tactics, primarily against civilian targets such as merchant vessels and coastal communities. Small Continental Navy ships such as USS Reprisal, USS Ranger, and USS Surprise made incursions into British and Irish waters during the war, attacking British-flagged merchantmen and forcing Britain to deploy more warships to the area along with increasing coastal defences. Although these incursions only inflicted minor losses on the Royal Navy and Britain's merchant fleet, they had a disproportionate psychological effect on the British public, which responded by demanding greater protection from American naval attacks. The Royal Navy also used asymmetric tactics to target American coastal communities, such as the burning of Falmouth by a force under Captain Henry Mowat. These attacks, carried out using small, mobile forces, spread terror among the Americans and destroyed vast quantities of buildings and material in exchange for minor losses.

In 1778, France entered the Revolutionary War on the American side, transforming the conflict into a global one and sharply reducing the asymmetric nature of the war. However, in the backcountry of North America, particularly in the American South, engagements between British and American forces often remained mostly asymmetric in nature.

=== American Civil War ===
The American Civil War saw the rise of asymmetric warfare in the Border States, and in particular on the US Western Territorial Border after the Kansas-Nebraska Act of 1854 opened the territories to vote on the expansion of slavery beyond the Missouri Compromise lines. Political implications of this broken 1820's compromise were nothing less than the potential expansion of slavery all across the North American continent, including the northern reaches of the annexed Mexican territories to California and Oregon. So the stakes were high, and it caused a flood of immigration to the border: some to grab land and expand slavery west, others to grab land and vote down the expansion of slavery. The pro-slavery land grabbers began asymmetric, violent attacks against the more pacifist abolitionists who had settled Lawrence and other territorial towns to suppress slavery. John Brown, the abolitionist, travelled to Osawatomie in the Kansas Territory expressly to foment retaliatory attacks back against the pro-slavery guerrillas who, by 1858, had twice ransacked both Lawrence and Osawatomie (where one of Brown's sons was shot dead).

The abolitionists would not return the attacks and Brown theorized that a violent spark set off on "the Border" would be a way to finally ignite his long hoped-for slave rebellion. Brown had broad-sworded slave owners at Potawatomi Creek, so the bloody civilian violence was initially symmetrical; however, once the American Civil War ignited in 1861, and when the state of Missouri voted overwhelmingly not to secede from the Union, the pro-slavers on the MO-KS border were driven either south to Arkansas and Texas, or underground—where they became guerrilla fighters and "Bushwhackers" living in the bushy ravines throughout northwest Missouri across the (now) state line from Kansas. The bloody "Border War" lasted all during the Civil War (and long after with guerrilla partisans like the James brothers cynically robbing and murdering, aided and abetted by lingering lost causers). Tragically the Western Border War was an asymmetric war: pro-slavery guerrillas and paramilitary partisans on the pro-Confederate side attacked pro-Union townspeople and commissioned Union military units, with the Union army trying to keep both in check: blocking Kansans and pro-Union Missourians from organizing militarily against the marauding Bushwhackers.

The worst act of domestic terror in U.S. history came in August 1863 when paramilitary guerrillas amassed 350 strong and rode all night 50 miles across eastern Kansas to the abolitionist stronghold of Lawrence (a political target) and destroyed the town, gunning down 150 civilians. The Confederate officer whose company had joined Quantrill's Raiders that day witnessed the civilian slaughter and forbade his soldiers from participating in the carnage. The commissioned officer refused to participate in Quantrill's asymmetric warfare on civilians.

=== Philippine–American War ===
The Philippine–American War (1899–1902) was an armed conflict between the United States and Filipino revolutionaries. Estimates of the Filipino forces vary between 100,000 and 1,000,000, with tens of thousands of auxiliaries. Lack of weapons and ammunition was a significant impediment to the Filipinos, so most of the forces were only armed with bolo knives, bows and arrows, spears and other primitive weapons that, in practice, proved vastly inferior to U.S. firepower.

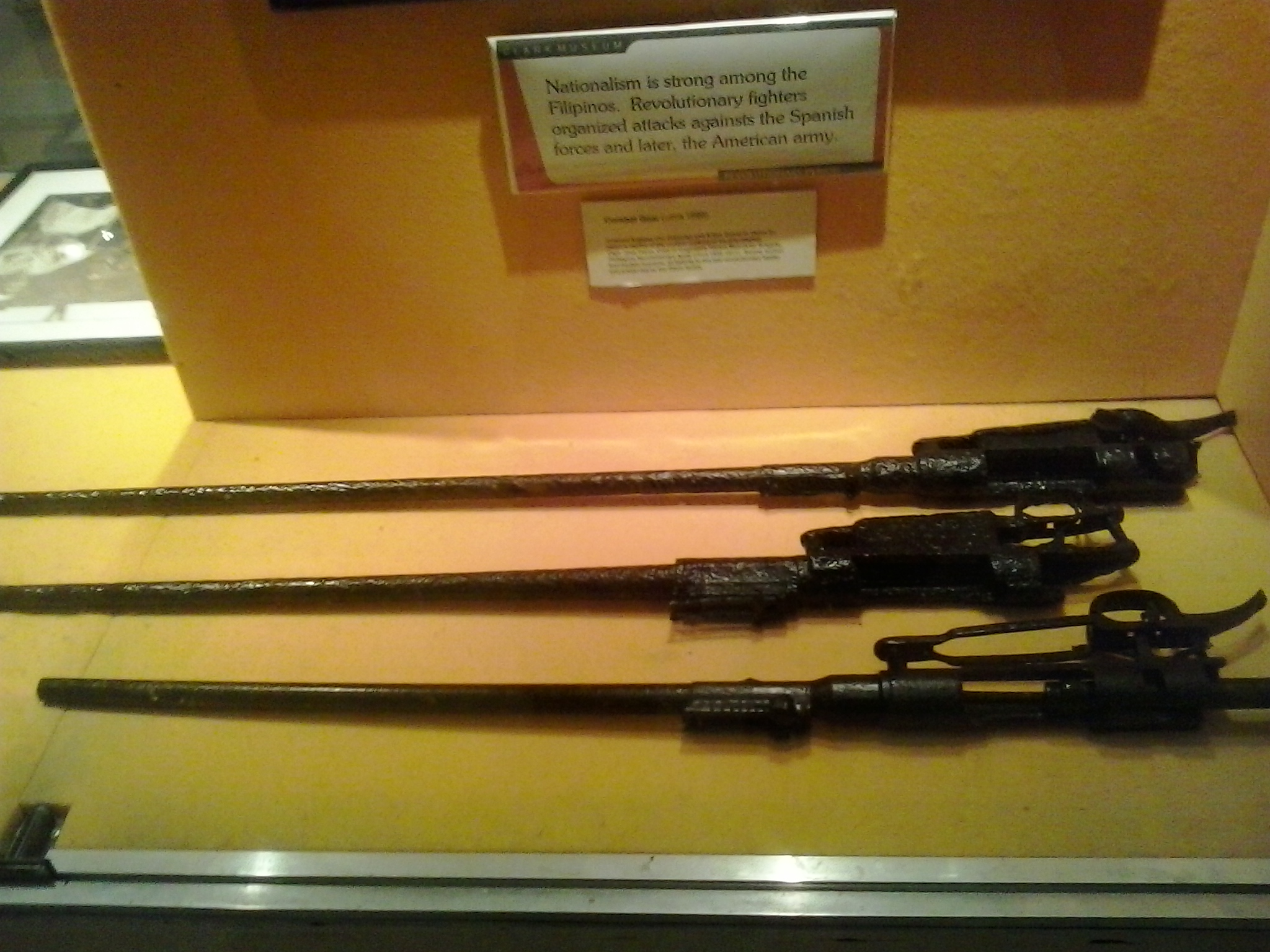
Remnants of rifles used by Filipino soldiers during the War on display at Clark Museum

The goal, or end-state, sought by the First Philippine Republic was a sovereign, independent, socially stable Philippines led by the ilustrado (intellectual) oligarchy. Local chieftains, landowners, and businessmen were the principales who controlled local politics. The war was strongest when illustrados, principales, and peasants were unified in opposition to annexation. The peasants, who provided the bulk of guerrilla forces, had interests different from their illustrado leaders and the principales of their villages. Coupled with the ethnic and geographic fragmentation, unity was a daunting task. The challenge for Aguinaldo and his generals was to sustain unified Filipino public opposition; this was the revolutionaries' strategic centre of gravity. The Filipino operational center of gravity was the ability to sustain its force of 100,000 irregulars in the field. The Filipino General Francisco Macabulos described the Filipinos' war aim as "not to vanquish the U.S. Army but to inflict on them constant losses." They initially sought to use conventional tactics and an increasing toll of U.S. casualties to contribute to McKinley's defeat in the 1900 presidential election. Their hope was that as president the avowedly anti-imperialist future Secretary of state William Jennings Bryan would withdraw from the Philippines. They pursued this short-term goal with guerrilla tactics better suited to a protracted struggle. While targeting McKinley motivated the revolutionaries in the short term, his victory demoralized them and convinced many undecided Filipinos that the United States would not depart precipitously. For most of 1899, the revolutionary leadership had viewed guerrilla warfare strategically only as a tactical option of final recourse, not as a means of operation which better suited their disadvantaged situation. On 13 November 1899, Emilio Aguinaldo decreed that guerrilla war would henceforth be the strategy. This made the American occupation of the Philippine archipelago more difficult over the next few years. In fact, during just the first four months of the guerrilla war, the Americans had nearly 500 casualties. The Philippine Revolutionary Army began staging bloody ambushes and raids, such as the guerrilla victories at Paye, Catubig, Makahambus, Pulang Lupa, Balangiga and Mabitac. At first, it seemed like the Filipinos would fight the Americans to a stalemate and force them to withdraw. President McKinley even considered this at the beginning of the phase. The shift to guerrilla warfare drove the U.S. Army to adopt counterinsurgency tactics.

=== 20th century ===
==== Second Boer War ====
Asymmetric warfare featured prominently during the Second Boer War. After an initial phase, which was fought by both sides as a conventional war, the British captured Johannesburg, the Boers' largest city, and captured the capitals of the two Boer Republics. The British then expected the Boers to accept peace as dictated in the traditional European manner. However, the Boers fought a protracted guerrilla war instead of capitulating. 20,000-30,000 Boer guerrillas were only defeated after the British brought to bear 450,000 imperial troops, about ten times as many as were used in the conventional phase of the war. The British began constructing blockhouses built within machine gun range of one another and flanked by barbed wire to slow the Boers' movement across the countryside and block paths to valuable targets. Such tactics eventually evolved into today's counterinsurgency tactics.

The Boer commando raids deep into the Cape Colony, which were organized and commanded by Jan Smuts, resonated throughout the century as the British adopted and adapted the tactics first used against them by the Boers.

==== World War I ====
- T. E. Lawrence and British support for the Arab uprising against the Ottoman Empire. The Ottomans were the stronger power, and the Arab coalition were the weaker.
- Austria-Hungary's invasion of Serbia, August 1914. Austria-Hungary was the stronger power, and Serbia was the weaker.
- Germany's invasion of Belgium, August 1914. Germany was the stronger power, Belgium the weaker.

==== Between the World Wars ====
- Kuva-yi Milliye were local, irregular Turkish militias that resisted occupation at the start of the Turkish War of Independence. They mainly fought against occupying forces, especially Greece, using guerrilla tactics like ambushes and hit-and-run attacks. Later, they were replaced by a centralized regular army under Mustafa Kemal Atatürk. The Turkish War of Independence ended with a Turkish victory, leading to the establishment of the modern Republic of Turkey under Mustafa Kemal Atatürk
- Abd el-Krim led resistance in Morocco from 1920 to 1924 against French and Spanish colonial armies ten times as strong as the guerrilla force, led by General Philippe Pétain.
- TIGR, the first anti-fascist national-defensive organization in Europe, fought against Benito Mussolini's regime in Northeast Italy.
- Anglo-Irish War (Irish War of Independence) fought between the Irish Republican Army and the Black and Tans/Auxiliaries. Though Lloyd George (Prime Minister at the time) attempted to persuade other nations that it was not a war by refusing to use the army and using the Black and Tans instead, the conflict was conducted as an asymmetric guerrilla war and was registered as a war with the League of Nations by the Irish Free State.

==== World War II ====
- Philippine resistance against Japan – During the Japanese occupation in World War II, there was an extensive Philippine resistance movement, which opposed the Japanese with an active underground and guerrilla activity that increased over the years.

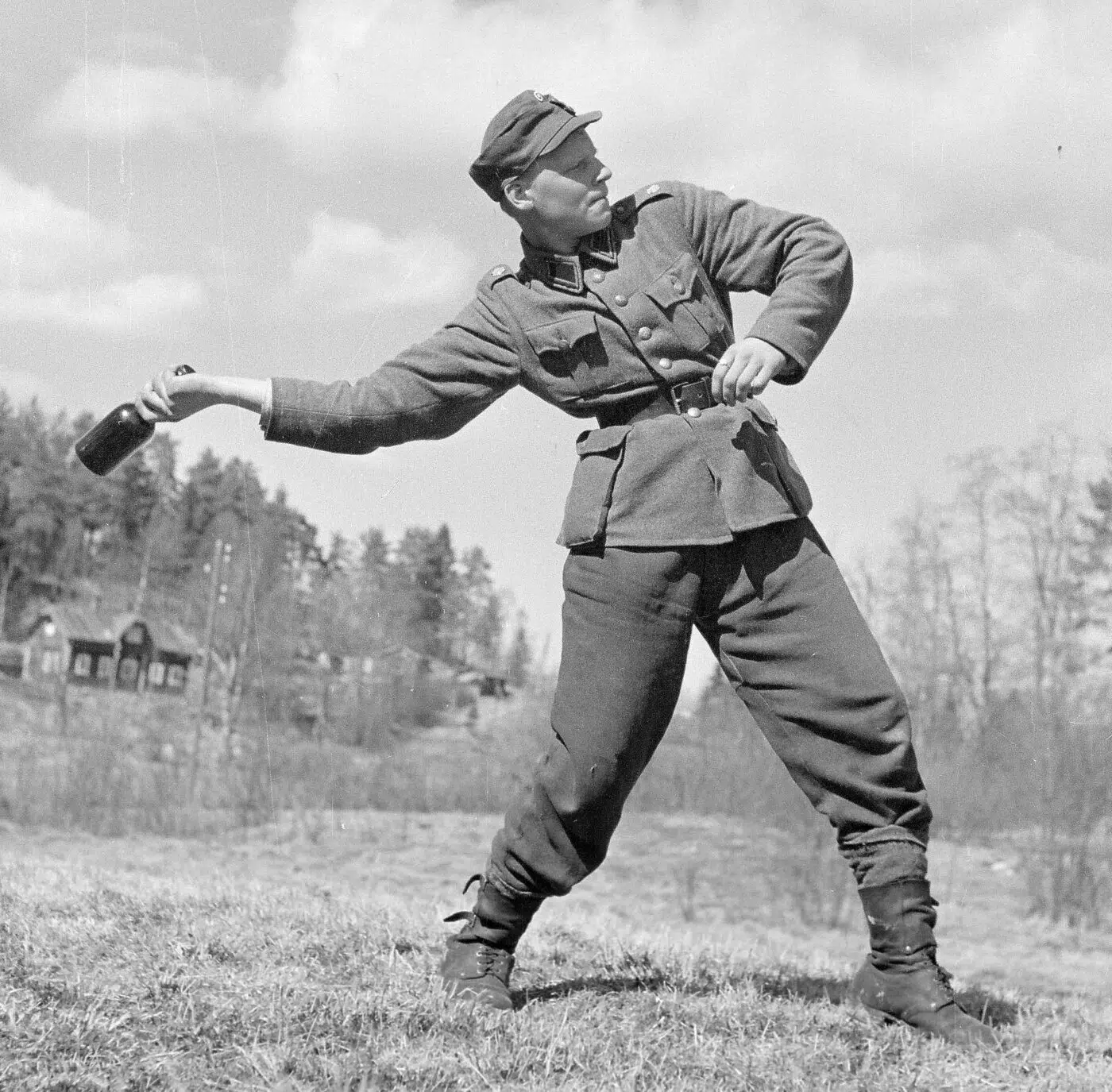
A Finnish soldier demonstrating a Molotov cocktail

- Winter War – Finland was invaded by the much larger mechanized military units of the Soviet Union. Although the Soviets captured 8% of Finland, they suffered enormous casualties versus much lower losses for the Finns. Soviet vehicles were confined to narrow forest roads by terrain and snow, while the Finns used ski tactics around them unseen through the trees. They cut the advancing Soviet column into what they called motti (a cubic metre of firewood) and then destroyed the cut-off sections one by one. Many Soviets were shot, had their throats cut from behind, or froze to death due to inadequate clothing and lack of camouflage and shelter. The Finns also devised a petrol bomb they called the Molotov cocktail to destroy Soviet tanks.
- Soviet partisans – resistance movement which fought in the German occupied parts of the Soviet Union.
- Warsaw Uprising – Poland (Home Army, Armia Krajowa) rose up against the German occupation.
- Germany's occupation of Yugoslavia, 1941–45 (Germany vs. Tito's Partisans and Mihailović's Chetniks).

===== Britain =====
- British Commandos and European coastal raids. German countermeasures and the notorious Commando Order.
- Long Range Desert Group and the Special Air Service in Africa and later in Europe.
- South East Asian Theater: Wingate, Chindits, Force 136, V Force
- Special Operations Executive (SOE)
- Provisional Irish Republican Army against British security forces in the Northern Campaign.

===== United States =====
- Office of Strategic Services (OSS)
- China Burma India Theater: Merrill's Marauders and OSS Detachment 101.

=== After World War II ===
- First Indochina War (1946–1954) and Algerian War of Independence (1954–1962); both against France.
- The Cuban Revolution of 1953–1958 became a template of asymmetric warfare.
- The Hungarian Revolution of 1956 (or "Russo-Hungarian" war) saw makeshift forces improvising lopsided tactics against Soviet tanks.
- Libyan support to the Provisional Irish Republican Army during the Troubles (1960s to 1998) and collusion between British security forces and Ulster loyalist paramilitaries.
- United States Military Assistance Command Studies and Observations Group (US MAC-V SOG) (1964–1972) and Viet Cong in Vietnam.
- The South African Border War, otherwise known as the Namibian War of Independence (1966–1990) between the South African Defense Force and People's Liberation Army of Namibia.
- United States support of the Nicaraguan Contras (1979–1990).

==== Cold War (1945–1992) ====
The end of World War II established the two strongest victors, the United States of America (the United States, or just the U.S.) and the Union of Soviet Socialist Republics (USSR, or just the Soviet Union) as the two dominant global superpowers.

===== Cold War examples of proxy wars =====
In Southeast Asia, specifically Vietnam, the Viet Minh, NLF and other insurgencies engaged in asymmetrical guerrilla warfare with France. The war between the Mujahideen and the Soviet Armed Forces during the Soviet–Afghan War of 1979 to 1989, though claimed as a source of the term "asymmetric warfare," occurred years after Mack wrote of "asymmetric conflict." (Note that the term "asymmetric warfare" became well-known in the West only in the 1990s.) The aid given by the U.S. to the Mujahideen during the war was only covert at the tactical level; the Reagan Administration told the world that it was helping the "freedom-loving people of Afghanistan." Many countries, including the U.S., participated in this proxy war against the USSR during the Cold War.

=== Post–Cold War ===
The Kosovo War, which pitted Yugoslav security forces (Serbian police and Yugoslav army) against Albanian separatists of the guerrilla Kosovo Liberation Army, is an example of asymmetric warfare, due to Yugoslav forces' superior firepower and manpower, and due to the nature of insurgency/counter-insurgency operations. The NATO bombing of Yugoslavia (1999), which pitted NATO air power against the Yugoslav armed forces during the Kosovo war, can also be classified as asymmetric, exemplifying international conflict with asymmetry in weapons and strategy/tactics.

=== 21st century ===
==== Israel/Palestine ====
The ongoing conflict between Israel and some Palestinian organizations (such as Hamas and PIJ) is a classic case of asymmetric warfare. Israel has a powerful army, air force and navy, while the Palestinian organizations have no access to large-scale military equipment with which to conduct operations; instead, they utilize asymmetric tactics, such as taking hostages, paragliding, small gunfights, cross-border sniping, indiscriminate mortar/rocket attacks, and others.

==== Sri Lanka ====
The Sri Lankan Civil War, which raged on and off from 1983 to 2009, between the Sri Lankan government and the Liberation Tigers of Tamil Eelam (LTTE) saw large-scale asymmetric warfare. The war started as an insurgency and progressed to a large-scale conflict with the mixture of guerrilla and conventional warfare, seeing the LTTE use suicide bombing (male/female suicide bombers) both on and off the battlefield use of explosive-filled boats for suicide attacks on military shipping; and use of light aircraft targeting military and economic infrastructure.

==== Iraq ====
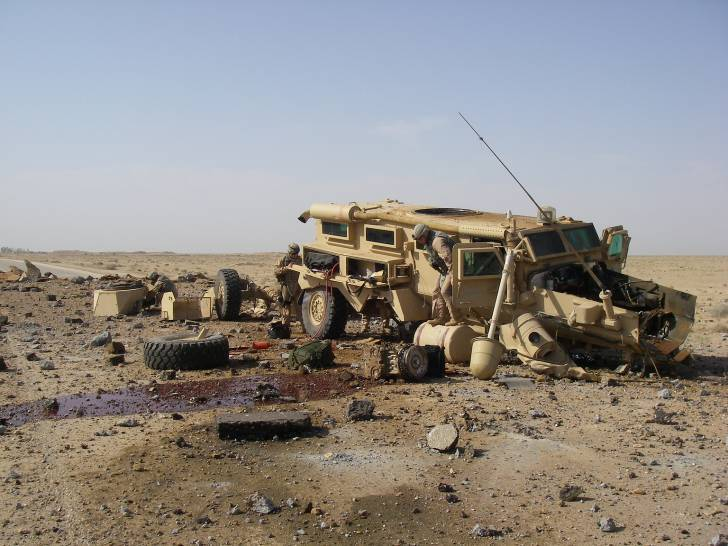
This Cougar in Al Anbar, Iraq, was hit by a directed charge IED approximately 300–500 lb (140–230 kg) in size.

The victory by the US-led coalition forces in the 1991 Persian Gulf War and the 2003 invasion of Iraq demonstrated that training, tactics and technology could provide overwhelming victories in the field of battle during modern conventional warfare. After Saddam Hussein's regime was removed from power, the Iraq campaign moved into a different type of asymmetric warfare where the coalition's use of superior conventional warfare training, tactics and technology was of much less use against continued opposition from the various partisan groups operating inside Iraq.

==== Syria ====
Much of the 2012–2024 Syrian Civil War has been asymmetrical. The Syrian National Coalition, Mujahideen, and Kurdish Democratic Union Party have been engaging with the forces of the Syrian government through asymmetric means. The conflict has seen large-scale asymmetric warfare across the country, with the forces opposed to the government unable to engage symmetrically with the Syrian government and resorting instead to other asymmetric tactics such as suicide bombings and targeted assassinations.

==== Ukraine ====
The 2022 Russian invasion of Ukraine has resulted in what could be described in some respects as an asymmetrical warfare scenario. Russia has a much larger economy, population, and has superior military might to Ukraine. The use of MAGURA V5 unmanned surface vehicles (USVs) to attack Russian Black Sea Fleet ships such as the Tsezar Kunikov has been cited as example of asymmetrical warfare by analysts.

The use of first-person view (FPV) drones, AI-assisted targeting tools, open-source geospatial intelligence (GEOINT), and decentralized crowdfunding in the Russo-Ukrainian war have been cited as examples of this trend. These techniques have demonstrated how comparatively inexpensive technologies can generate disproportionate battlefield effects.

== Semi-symmetric warfare ==
A new understanding of warfare has emerged amidst the 2022 Russian invasion of Ukraine. Although this type of warfare does not oppose an insurgency to a counter-insurgency force, it does involve two actors with substantially asymmetrical means of waging war. Notably, as technology has improved war-fighting capabilities, it has also made them more complex, thus requiring greater expertise, training, flexibility and decentralization. The nominally weaker military can exploit those complexities and seek to eliminate the asymmetry. This has been observed in Ukraine, as defending forces used a rich arsenal of anti-tank and anti-air missiles to negate the invading forces' apparent mechanized and aerial superiority, thus denying their ability to conduct combined arms operations. The success of this strategy is compounded by access to real-time intelligence and the adversary's inability to utilize its forces to the maximum of their potential due to factors such as the inability to plan, brief and execute complex, full-spectrum operations.

== See also ==
- Civilian casualty ratio
- Counter-insurgency
- Counter-terrorism
- Foco theory
- Fourth-generation warfare
- Free War
- Grey-zone (international relations)
- Guerrilla warfare
- Irregular military
- List of guerrillas
- Lawfare
- Low intensity conflict
- Military use of children
- Millennium Challenge 2002
- New generation warfare
- People's war
- Partisan (military)
- Political warfare
- Protracted social conflict
- Reagan Doctrine
- Resistance movement
- Scorched earth
- Unconventional warfare
- Unconventional warfare (United States)
- Unrestricted Warfare
- War amongst the people
- War on terror
- Yank Levy

U.S. organizations:

- Center for Asymmetric Warfare (CAW)
- Asymmetric Warfare Group

Wars

- 2006 Lebanon War
- People's War in Nepal
- Second Gaza war

Documents:

- Management of Savagery
