= Structural inequality =

Form of social inequality

Structural inequality occurs when the fabric of organizations, institutions, governments or social networks contains an embedded cultural, linguistic, economic, religious/belief, physical or identity based bias which provides advantages for some members and marginalizes or produces disadvantages for other members. This can involve, personal agency, freedom of expression, property rights, freedom of association, religious freedom, social status, or unequal access to health care, housing, education, physical, cultural, social, religious or political belief, financial resources or other social opportunities. Structural inequality is believed to be an embedded part of all known cultural groups. The global history of slavery, serfdom, indentured servitude and other forms of coerced cultural or government mandated labour or economic exploitation that marginalizes individuals and the subsequent suppression of human rights (see UDHR) are key factors defining structural inequality.

Structural inequality can be encouraged and maintained in society through structured institutions such as state governments, and other cultural institutions like government run school systems with the goal of maintaining the existing governance/tax structure regardless of wealth, employment opportunities, and social standing of different identity groups by keeping minority students from high academic achievement in high school and college as well as in the workforce of the country. In the attempt to equalize allocation of state funding, policymakers evaluate the elements of disparity to determine an equalization of funding throughout school districts.

Formal equality of opportunity disregards collective dimensions of inequality, which are addressed by substantive equality with equality of outcomes for each group. Combating structural inequality therefore often requires the broad, policy based structural change on behalf of government organizations, and is often a critical component of poverty reduction. In many ways, a well-organized democratic government that can effectively combine moderate growth with redistributive policies stands the best chance of combating structural inequality.

== Education ==
Education is the base for equality. Specifically in the structuring of schools, the concept of tracking is believed by some scholars to create a social disparity in providing students an equal education. Schools have been found to have a unique acculturative process that helps to pattern self-perceptions and world views. Schools not only provide education but also a setting for students to develop into adults, form future social status and roles, and maintain social and organizational structures of society. Tracking is an educational term that indicates where students will be placed during their secondary school years.^{[3]} "Depending on how early students are separated into these tracks, determines the difficulty in changing from one track to another" (Grob, 2003, p. 202).

Tracking or sorting categorizes students into different groups based on standardized test scores. These groups or tracks are vocational, general, and academic. Students are sorted into groups that will determine educational and vocational outcomes for the future. The sorting that occurs in the educational system parallels the hierarchical social and economic structures in society. Thus, students are viewed and treated differently according to their individual track. Each track has a designed curriculum that is meant to fit the unique educational and social needs of each sorted group. Consequently, the information taught as well as the expectations of the teachers differ based on the track resulting in the creation of dissimilar classroom cultures.

== Spatial/regional ==
Globally, the issue of spatial inequality is largely a result of disparities between urban and rural areas. A study commissioned by the United Nations University WIDER project has shown that for the twenty-six countries included in the study, spatial inequalities have been high and on the increase, especially for developing nations. Many of these inequalities were traced back to “second nature” geographic forces that describe the infrastructure a society has in place for facilitating the trade of goods and employment between economic agents. Another dominant and related factor is the ease of access to bodies of water and forms of long-distance trade like ports. The discrepancies between the growth of communities close to these bodies of water and those further away have been noted in cases between and within countries. In the United States and many other developed countries, spatial inequality has developed into more specific forms described by residential segregation and housing discrimination. This has especially come into focus as education and employment are often tied into where a household is located relative to urban centers, and a variety of metrics, from education levels to welfare benefits have been correlated to spatial data.

=== Consequences ===
Specifically, studies have identified a number of economic consequences of housing segregation. Perhaps the most obvious is the isolation of minorities, which creates a deficit in the potential for developing human capital. Second, many of the public schools that areas of low socioeconomic status have access to are underperforming, in part due to the limited budgeting the district receives from the limited tax base in the same area. Finally, another large factor is simply the wealth and security homeownership represents. Property values rarely increase in areas where poverty is high in the first place.

=== Causes ===
The causes of spatial inequality, however, are more complex. The mid-20th century phenomenon of the large-scale migration of white middle-class families from urban centers has coined the term white flight. While the current state of housing discrimination can be partly attributed to this phenomenon, a larger set of institutionalized discrimination, like bias in loan and real estate industries and government policies, have helped to perpetuate the division created since then. These include bias found in the banking and real estate industries as well as discriminatory public policies that promote racial segregation. In addition, rising income inequality between blacks and whites since the 1970s have created affluent neighborhoods that tend to be composed of a homogeneous racial background of families within the same income bracket. A similar situation within the racial lines have helped to explain how more than 32% of blacks now live in suburbs. However, these new suburbs are often divided along racial lines, and a 1992 survey showed that 82% of blacks preferred to live a suburb where their race is in the majority. This is further aggravated by practices like racial steering, in which realtors guide home buyers towards neighborhood based on race.

=== Transportation ===
Government policies that have tended to promote spatial inequalities include actions by the Federal Housing Administration (FHA) in the United States in promoting redlining, a practice where mortgages could be selectively administered while excluding certain urban neighborhood deemed risky, oftentimes because of race. Practices like this continued to prevent home buyers from getting mortgages in redlined areas until the 1960s, when the FHA discontinued the determination of restrictions based on racial composition.

The advent of freeways also added a complex layer of incentives and barriers which helped to increase spatial inequalities. First, these new networks allowed for middle-class families to move out to the suburbs while retaining connections like employment to the urban center. Second, and perhaps more importantly, freeways were routed through minority neighborhoods, oftentimes creating barriers between these neighborhoods and central business districts and middle class areas. Highway plans often avoided a more direct route through upper or middle class neighbors because minorities did not have sufficient power to prevent such actions from happening.

=== Solutions ===
Douglas Steven Massey identifies three goals specifically for the United States to end residential segregation: reorganize the structure of metropolitan government, make greater investment in education, and finally open housing market so full participation More specifically, he advocates broader, metropolitan-wide units of taxation and governance where the tax base and decisions are made equally by both the urban and suburban population. Education is the key to closing employment inequalities in a post-manufacturing era. And finally, the federal government must take large strides towards enforcing the anti-segregation measures related to housing it has already put into place, like the Fair Housing Act, the Home Mortgage Disclosure Act, and the Community Reinvestment Act. Another set of divisions that may be useful in framing policy solutions include three categories: place-based policies, people-based policies, and indirect approaches. Place-based policies include improving community facilities and services like schools and public safety in inner-city areas in an effort to appeal to middle-class families. These programs must be balanced with concerns of gentrification. People-based policies help increase access to credit for low-income families looking to move, and this sort of policy has been typified by the Community Reinvestment Act and its many revisions throughout its legislative history. Finally, indirect approaches often involve providing better transportation options to low-income areas, like public transit routes or subsidized car ownership. These approaches target the consequences rather than the causes of segregation, and rely on the assumption that one of the most harmful effects of spatial inequality is the lack of access to employment opportunities. In conclusion, a common feature in all of these is the investment in the capital and infrastructure of inner-city or neighborhood.

== Healthcare ==
The quality of healthcare that a patient receives strongly depends upon its accessibility. Kelley et al. define access to healthcare as “the timely use of personal health services to achieve the best health outcomes”. Health disparities, which are largely caused by unequal access to healthcare, can be defined as “a difference in which disadvantaged social groups such as the poor, racial/ethnic minorities, women and other groups who have persistently experienced social disadvantage or discrimination systematically experience worse health or greater health risks than most advantaged social groups.” Manifestations of inequality in healthcare appear throughout the world and are a topic of urgency in the United States. In fact, studies have shown that income-related inequality in healthcare expenditures favors the wealthy to a greater degree in the United States than most other Western nations. The enormous costs of healthcare, coupled with the vast number of Americans lacking health insurance, indicate the severe inequality and serious problems that exist. The healthcare system in the United States perpetuates inequality by “rationing health care according to a person’s ability to pay, by providing inadequate and inferior health care to poor people and persons of color, and by failing to establish structures that can meet the health needs of Americans”.

=== Racial ===
Racial disparity in access and quality of healthcare is a serious problem in the United States and is reflected by evidence such as the fact that African American life expectancies lag behind that of whites by over 5 years, and African Americans tend to experience more chronic conditions. African Americans have a 30% higher death rate from cardiovascular disease and experience 50% more diabetic complications than their white counterparts. The Agency for Healthcare Research and Quality (AHRQ), directed by Congress, led an effort for the development of two annual reports by the Department of Health and Human Services (DHHS), the National Healthcare Quality Report and the National Healthcare Disparities Report, which tracked disparities in healthcare in relation to racial and socioeconomic factors. These reports developed about 140 measures of quality of care and about 100 measures of access to care, which were used to measure the healthcare disparities. The first reports, released in December 2003, found that blacks and Hispanics experienced poorer healthcare quality for about half of the quality measures reported in the NHQR and NDHR. Also, Hispanics and Asians experienced poorer access to care for about two thirds of the healthcare access measures. Recent studies on Medicare patients show that black patients receive poorer medical care than their white counterparts. Compared with white patients, blacks receive far fewer operations, tests, medications and other treatments, suffering greater illnesses and more deaths as a result. Measures done by the Agency for Healthcare Research and Quality (AHRQ) show that “fewer than 20% of disparities faced by Blacks, AI/ANs and Hispanics showed evidence of narrowing.”

One specific study showed that African Americans are less likely than whites to be referred for cardiac catheterization and bypass grafting, prescription of analgesia for pain control, and surgical treatment of lung cancer. Both African Americans and Latinos also receive less pain medication than whites for long bone fractures and cancer. Other studies showed that African Americans are reported to receive fewer pediatric prescriptions, poorer quality of hospital care, fewer hospital admissions for chest pain, lower quality of prenatal care, and less appropriate management of congestive heart failure and pneumonia.

Language-barriers became a large factor in the process of seeking healthcare due to the rise in minorities across the United States. In 2007, an estimate done by the Census Bureau stated that 33.6% of the United States belonged to racial ethnicities other than non-Hispanic whites. Of people within the United States during this time, 20% spoke a language different from English at home. Having a language-barrier can cause many hurdles when pertaining to healthcare: difficulty communicating with health professionals, sourcing/the funding of language assistance, having little to no access to translators, etc. A 2050 projection showed that over 50% of the United States would belong to a racial category other than non-Hispanic white. Thus, demonstrating the rapid increase of minorities over time within the United States and the importance of it.

=== Gender ===
In addition to race, healthcare inequality also manifests across gender lines. Though women tend to live longer than men, they tend to report poorer health status, more disabilities as they age, and tend to be higher utilizers of the healthcare system. Healthcare disparities often put women at a disadvantage. Such time must be scheduled around work (whether formal or informal), child care needs, and the geography—which increases the travel time necessary for those who do not live near healthcare facilities. Furthermore, “poor women and their children tend to have inadequate housing, poor nutrition, poor sanitation, and high rates of physical, emotional, and sexual abuse.” Since women and children constitute 80% of the poor in the United States, they are particularly susceptible to experiencing the negative impact of healthcare inequality.

=== Spatial ===
Spatial inequalities in distribution and geographic location also affect access and quality of healthcare. A study done by Rowland, Lyons, and Edwards (1988) found that rural patients were more likely to be poor and uninsured. Because of the fewer healthcare resources available in rural areas, these patients received fewer medical services than urban patients. Other studies showed that African Americans and Hispanics are more likely than whites to live in areas that are underserved by healthcare providers, forcing them to wait longer for care in crowded and/or understaffed facilities or traveling longer distances to receive care in other areas. This travel time often poses an obstacle to receiving medical care and often leads patients to delay care until later. In fact, African Americans and Hispanics are more likely than whites to delay seeking medical care until their condition becomes serious, rather than seeking regular medical care, because travel and wait times are both costly and an interference in other daily activities.

An individual's environment greatly impacts his or her health status. For example, three of the five largest landfills in the United States are situated in communities which are predominantly African American and Latino, contributing to some of the highest pediatric asthma rates in those groups. Impoverished individuals who find themselves unable to leave their neighborhoods consequently are continuously exposed to the same harmful environment, which negatively impacts health.

=== Economic ===
Socioeconomic background is another source of inequality in healthcare. Poverty significantly influences the production of disease since poverty increases the likelihood of having poor health in addition to decreasing the ability to afford preventive and routine healthcare. Lack of access to healthcare has a significant negative impact on patients, especially those who are uninsured, since they are less likely to have a regular source of care, such as a primary care physician, and are more likely to delay seeking care until their condition becomes life-threatening. Studies show that people with health insurance receive significantly more care than those who are uninsured, the most vulnerable groups being minorities, young adults, and low-income individuals. The same trend for uninsured versus insured patients holds true for children as well.

Hadley, Steinberg, and Feder (1991) found that hospitalized patients who are not covered under health insurance are less likely to receive high-cost, specialized procedures and as a result, are more likely to die while hospitalized. Feder, Hadley, and Mullner (1984) noticed that hospitals often ration free care by denying care to those who are unable to pay and cutting services commonly used by the uninsured poor. Minorities are less likely to have health insurance because are less likely to occupy middle to upper income brackets, and therefore are incapable of purchasing health insurance, and also because they tend to hold low-paying jobs that do not provide health insurance as part of their job-related benefits. Census data show that 78.7% of whites are covered by private insurance compared with 54% of blacks and 51% of Hispanics. About 29% of Hispanics in the United States have neither private nor government health insurance of any kind.

A study done on Medicare recipients also showed that despite the uniform benefits offered, high-income elderly patients received 60% more physician services and 45% more days of hospital care than lower-income elderly patients not covered by Medicaid. After adjustment for health status, people with higher incomes are shown to have higher expenditures, indicating that the wealthy are strongly favored in income-related inequality in medical care. However, this inequality differs across age groups. Inequality was shown to be greatest for senior citizens, then adults, and least for children. This pattern showed that financial resources and other associated attributes, such as educational attainment, were very influential in access and utilization of medical care.

=== Solutions ===
The acknowledgement that access to health services differed depending on race, geographic location, and socioeconomic background was an impetus in establishing health policies to benefit these vulnerable groups. In 1965, specific programs, such as Medicare and Medicaid, were implemented in the United States in an attempt to extend health insurance to a greater portion of the population. Medicare is a federally funded program that provides health insurance for people aged 65 or older, people younger than 65 with certain disabilities, and people of any age who have End-Stage Renal Disease (ERSD). Medicaid, on the other hand, provides health coverage to certain low income people and families and is largely state-governed. However, studies have shown that for-profit hospitals tend to make healthcare less accessible to uninsured patients in addition to those under Medicaid in an effort to contain costs. Another program, the State Children's Health Insurance Program (SCHIP) provides low cost health insurance to children in families who do not qualify for Medicaid but cannot afford private health insurance on their own. The necessity of achieving equity in quality of and access to healthcare is glaring and urgent. According to Fein (1972), this goal could include equal health outcomes for all by income group, equal expenditures per capita across income groups, or eliminating income as a healthcare rationing device. Some have proposed that a national health insurance plan with comprehensive benefits and no deductibles or other costs from the patients would provide the most equity. Fein also stressed that healthcare reform was needed, specifically in eliminating financial assistance to treat patients that depended on patient income or the quantity of services given. He proposed instead paying physicians on a salaried basis. Another study, by Reynolds (1976), found that community health centers improved access to health care for many vulnerable groups, including youth, blacks, and people with serious diseases. The study indicated that community health centers provided more preventive care and greater continuity of care, though there were problems in obtaining adequate funding as well as adequate staffing. Engaging the community to understand the link between social issues such as employment, education, and poverty can help motivate community members to advocate for policies that improve health status.

Increasing the racial and ethnic diversity of healthcare providers can also serve as a potential solution. Racial and ethnic minority healthcare providers are much more likely than their white counterparts to serve minority communities, which can have many positive effects. Advocating for an increase in minority healthcare providers can help improve the quality of patient-physician communication as well as reduce the crowding in understaffed facilities in areas in which minorities reside. This can help decrease wait times as well as increase the likelihood that such patients will seek out nearby healthcare facilities rather than traveling farther distances as a last resort.

Implementing efforts to increase translation services can also improve quality of healthcare. This means increased availability of bilingual and bicultural healthcare providers for non-English speakers. Studies show that non-English speaking patients self-reported better physical functioning, psychological well-being, health perceptions, and lower pain when receiving treatment from a physician who spoke their language. Hispanic patients specifically reported increased compliance to treatment plans when their physician spoke Spanish and also shared a similar background. Training programs to improve and broaden physicians’ communication skills can increase patient satisfaction, patient compliance, patient participation in treatment decisions, and utilization of preventative care services

The idea of universal health care, which is implemented in many other countries, has been a subject of heated debate in the United States.

== Employment ==
Employment is a key source of income for a majority of the world's population, and therefore is the most direct method through which people can escape poverty. However, unequal access to decent work and persistent labor market inequalities frustrate efforts to reduce poverty. Studies have further divided employment segregation into two categories: first generation and second generation discrimination. First generation discrimination occurs as an overt bias displayed by employers, and since the end of the civil rights era has been on the decline. Second generation discrimination; on the other hand, is less direct and therefore much harder to legislate against. This helps explain the disparity between female hiring rates and male/female ratios, which have gone up recently, and the relative scarcity of women in upper-level management positions. Therefore, while there is extensive legislation passed regarding employment discrimination, informal barriers still exist in the workplace. For instance, gender discrimination often takes the form of working hours and childcare-related benefits. In many cases, female professionals who must take maternity leave or single mothers who must care for their children often are at a disadvantage when it comes to promotions and advancement.

=== Education level ===
Employment discrimination is also closely linked to education and skills. One of the most important factors that can help describe employment disparities was that for much of the post-WWII-era, many Western countries began shedding the manufacturing jobs that provided relatively high-wage jobs to people with moderate to low job skills. Starting from the 1960s, the United States began a shift away from low-wage jobs, especially in the manufacturing sector, towards technology-based or service-based employment. This had an unbalanced effect of decreasing employment opportunities for the least educated in the labor force while at the same time increasing the productivity and therefore wages of the skilled labor force, increasing the level of inequality. In addition, globalization has tended to compound this decrease in demand of domestic unskilled labor.

Finally, weak labor market policies since the 70's and 80's have failed to address the income inequalities that those who are employed at lower income levels have to face. Namely, the union movement began to shrink, decreasing the power for employees to negotiate employment terms, and the minimum wage was prevented from increasing alongside inflation.

=== Racial ===
Other barriers include human capital occupations that require an extensive network for developing clientele, like lawyers, physicians, and salesmen. Studies have shown that for blacks and whites in the same occupation, whites can often benefit for a wealthier pool of clients and connections. In addition, studies show that only a small percentage of low-skilled employees are hired through advertisements or cold calls, highlighting the importance of social connections with middle- and upper- class employers. Furthermore, racially disparate employment consequences can arise from racial patterns in other social processes and institutions, such as criminal justice contact (often with spillover effects on local communities of color). At the county level, for example, jail incarceration has been found to significantly diminish local labor markets in areas with relatively high proportions of Black residents.

=== Gender ===
Though women have become an increasing presence in the workforce, there currently exists a gender gap in earnings. Statistics show that women who work full-time year-round earn 75% of the income as their male counterparts. Part of the gender gap in employment earnings is due to women concentrating in different occupational fields than men, which is known as occupational segregation. The 1990 Census data show that more than 50% of women would have to change jobs before women would be distributed in the same way as men within the job market, achieving complete gender integration. This can be attributed to the tendency of women to choose degrees that funnel into jobs that are less lucrative than those chosen by men.

Other studies have shown that the Hay system, which evaluates jobs, undervalues the occupations that tend to be filled by women, which continues to bias wages against women's work. Once a certain job becomes associated with women, its social value decreases. Almost all studies show that the percentage of women is correlated with lower earnings for both males and females even in fields that required significant job skills, which suggests a strong effect of gender composition on earnings. Additionally, women tend to be hired into less desirable jobs than men and are denied access to more skilled jobs or jobs that place them in an authoritative role. In general, women tend to hold fewer positions of power when compared to men. A study done by Reskin and Ross (1982) showed that when tenure and productivity-related measurements were controlled, women had less authority and earned less than men of equal standing in their occupation. Exclusionary practices provide the most valuable job openings and career opportunities for members of groups of higher status which, in the United States, mostly means Caucasian males. Therefore, males are afforded more advantages than females and perpetuate this cycle while they still hold more social power, allocating lower-skilled and lower-paying jobs to females and minorities.

=== Inequality in investment of skills ===
Another factor of the gender earnings gap is reflected in the difference in job skills between women and men. Studies suggest that women invest less in their own occupational training because they stay in the workforce for a shorter period of time than men (because of marriage or rearing children) and therefore have a shorter time span to benefit from their extra efforts. However, there is also discrimination by the employer. Studies have shown that the earnings gap is also due to employers investing less money in training female employees, which leads to a gender disparity in accessing career development opportunities.

=== Prescribed gender roles ===
Women tend to stay in the workforce for less time than men due to marriage or the time devoted to raising children. Consequently, men are typically viewed as the “breadwinners” of the family, which is reflected in the employee benefits provided in careers that are traditionally occupied by males. A study done by Heidi M. Berggren, assessing the employee benefits provided to nurses (a traditional female career) and automobile mechanics and repairmen (a traditional male career), found that the latter provided more significant benefits such as health insurance and other medical emergency benefits whereas the former provided more access to sick leave with full pay. This outlines the roles allotted to women as the caregivers and the men as the providers of the family which subsequently encourages men to seek gainful employment while encouraging women to have a larger role at home than in the workplace. Many parental leave policies in the US are poorly developed and reinforce the roles of men as the breadwinner and women as the caregiver.

=== Glass ceiling ===
Women have often described subtle gender barriers in career advancement, known as the glass ceiling. This refers to the limited mobility of women in the workforce due to social restrictions that limit their opportunities and affect their career decisions.

=== Solutions ===
A study done by Doorne-Huiskes, den Dulk, and Schippers (1999) showed that in countries with government policy addressing the balance between work and family life, women have high participation in the work force and there is a smaller gender wage gap, indicating that such policy could encourage mothers to stay in their occupations while also encouraging men to take on a greater child-rearing role. Such measure include mandating employers to provide paid parental leave for employees so that both parents can care for children without risk to their careers. Another suggested measure is government-provided day care for children aged 0–6 or financial support for employees to pay for their own child-care.

In 1978, the Pregnancy Discrimination Act was passed and amended Title VII of the Civil Rights Act of 1964. This act designated discrimination based on pregnancy, childbirth, or associated medical issues as illegal gender discrimination. The Family and Medical Leave Act, passed in 1993, required employers to give up to twelve weeks of unpaid leave for the birth or adoption of a child and providing care for immediate family members who are ill. These two acts helped publicize the important role women play in caring for family members and gave women more opportunities to retain jobs that they would have previously lost. However, the Family and Medical Leave Act of 1993 is limited in that only 60% of all employees in the U.S. are eligible for this leave since many small business are exempt from such coverage.

The fact that parental leave measures continue to enforce traditional division of labor between the genders indicates a need to reduce the stigma of male parenting as well as the stigma of parenthood on female employment opportunities. Some possible developments to improve parental leave include: offering job protection, full benefits, and substantial pay as a part of parental leave to heighten the social value of both parents caring for children, making parental leave more flexible so that both parents can take time off, reducing the negative impact of parental leave on job standing, and encouraging fathers to care for children by providing educational programs regarding pre-natal and post-natal care.

== See also ==
- Protracted social conflict
- The purpose of a system is what it does
