= Protracted social conflict =

Term for ongoing, complex conflicts

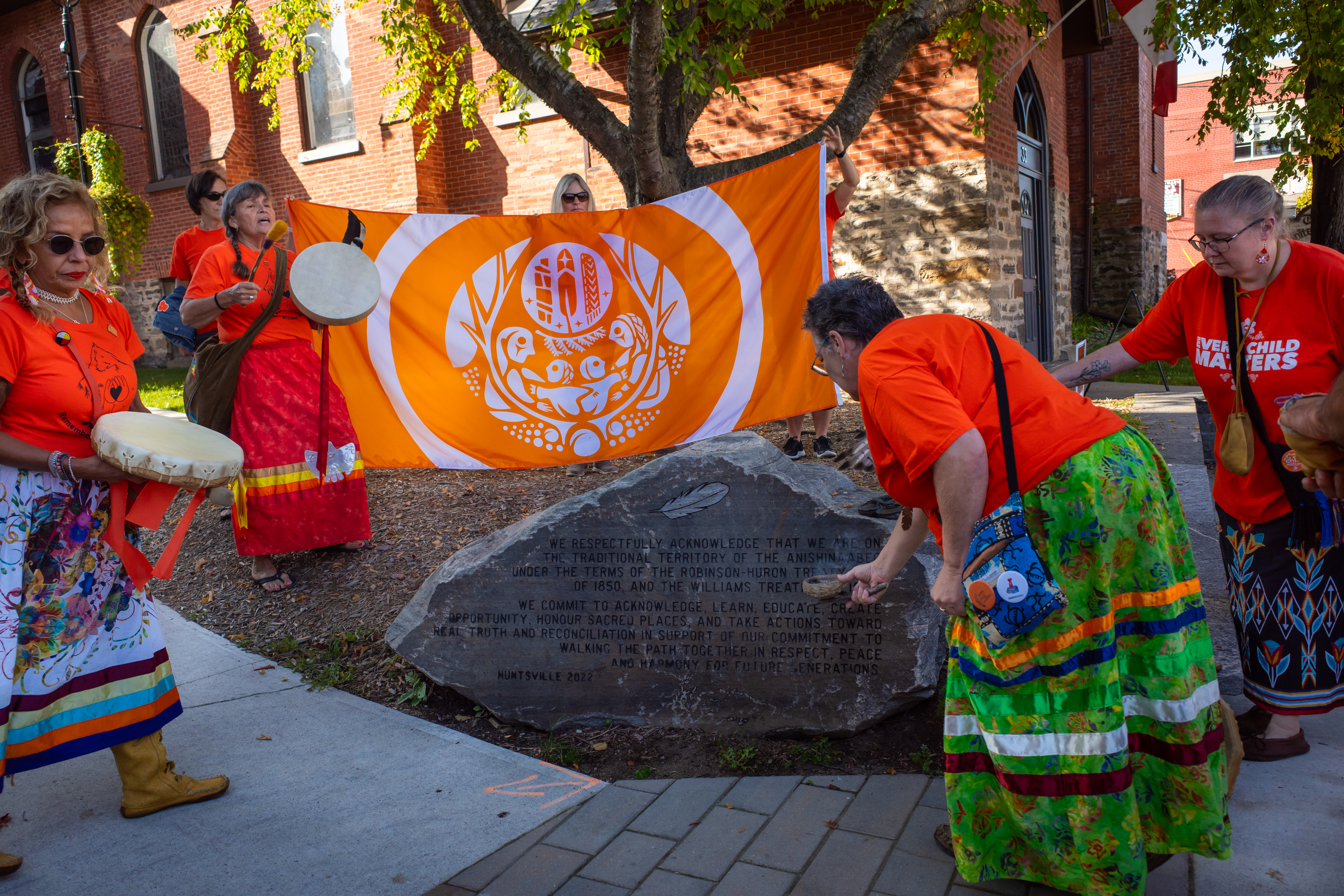
Indigenous women gather to commemorate the National Day for Truth and Reconciliation in Huntsville, Ontario.

Protracted social conflict is a technical term that generally refers to conflicts which are complex, severe, enduring, and often violent. The term was first presented in a theory developed by Edward Azar and contemporary researchers and conflict scholars continue to use it.

There are a number of sources and preconditions that lead to protracted social conflict. One understanding focuses on hostile interactions between groups that are based in deep-seated racial, ethnic, religious and cultural hatred. These conflicts often also have other causes, such as entrenched economic inequality and differentials in political power. They usually persist over long periods of time with sporadic outbreaks of violence. When a group's identity is threatened or frustrated, protracted social conflict is more likely to occur.

There are a number of different methods utilized for resolving protracted social conflict. Some of these include the ARIA model, the STAR model, truth and reconciliation commissions, contact models, identity affirmation frameworks, and amnesty models.

Protracted social conflicts have proliferated throughout the world. Examples include the Israeli–Palestinian conflict, the Kashmir conflict, the Sri Lankan civil war, the Cyprus problem, the first, second, and current Sudanese civil wars, apartheid in South Africa, the Rohingya genocide, the Troubles in Northern Ireland, and the Western Sahara conflict.

== Definition ==
Protracted social conflict describes a theory originally developed by Edward Azar. The term refers to conflict situations characterized by prolonged and often violent struggle between communal groups for such basic needs as security, recognition, acceptance, fair access to political institutions, and economic participation.

The communal groups may experience deep-seated cleavages based upon racial, religious, cultural or ethnic lines. These cleavages are characterized by continuing hostility with sporadic outbreaks of violence. They are caused by the frustration of human needs for security, recognition, and distributive justice. Cross-cuttiness is also very common along cleavage structures where divisions within society overlap and “cross-cut" on another group that may have similarities in ethnicity, religion, or social background. Greater association with ethnicity and religious affiliation leads to solidified loyalty groups, motivating harmony on social issues and reducing the chances of civil war onset which hinders protracted social conflict.

Such identity-driven rifts are the result of an underlying fear of extinction that often grows within vulnerable ethnic groups who live with the memories or fear of persecution and massacre. Ethnic divisions and perceived threats often result in the domination of the state machinery by a single group or coalition of elites who deny access to basic human needs for the majority of the population.

== Causes and preconditions ==
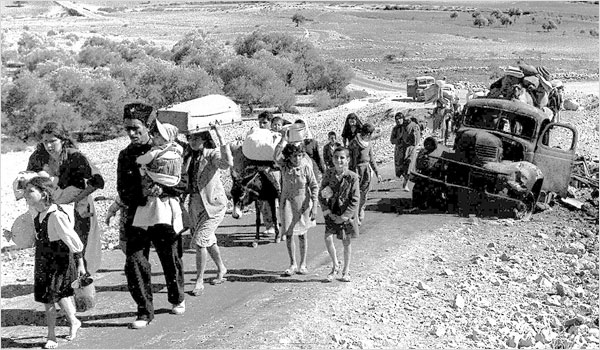
Palestinian refugees fleeing Galilee in 1948 during the first Nakba

The causes of protracted social conflicts are diverse and numerous. However, there are often common themes: disputes over land, entrenched racial or ethnic tension, political marginalization of certain groups, and prolonged structural inequality are all examples. Since Azar's original work on protracted social conflict, other scholars have developed and continue to contribute to our understanding of its causes and preconditions.

Conflicts tend to be intractable if the adversaries have incompatible goals. This may involve fights over items that cannot be divided, shared, compromised, or substituted. A conflict may be protracted even if, for example, a contested piece of land could theoretically be divided. The dynamics of a conflict may involve a repeated action–reaction sequence leading to escalation of violence as well as increased military mobilization and enlargement of the conflict by involving neighbor territories and external support (proxy war). Leaders of the conflicting adversaries may become entrapped by their own rhetoric and propaganda so that they are continuing the conflict in order to save face and to stay in office.

Asymmetric conflicts are often protracted because of unequal negotiating power. A negotiated peace agreement is unlikely to be satisfactory to a weak party with weak negotiating power. The conflict is likely to flare up again as long as the grievances of the weak party are not addressed in a satisfactory way.

=== Azar's preconditions ===
Azar argued that the denial of basic human needs to a large portion of the population initiated instances of protracted social violence. Four preconditions are isolated by Azar as the predominant sources of protracted social conflict: communal content, deprivation of human needs, governance and the state's role, and international linkages.

==== Communal content ====
This element, which contributes to the initial creation of protracted social conflict, consists of the fact that people involved in protracted social conflicts create their own identity groups. Azar notes, "that it is the relationship between identity groups and the states, which is at the core of the problem." He also cited the "disarticulation between the state and society as a whole" as a source of violence within a society.

This precondition also involves the reliance that many people have on their social groups; because governments in areas that experience protracted social conflict are often unable, incapable or unwilling to provide basic human necessities to the population, individuals turn to their social groups for stability. The resultant disconnection of society and the state can be linked to the colonial legacy, which, "artificially imposed European ideas of territorial statehood onto a multitude of communal groups."

This results in the domination of certain identity groups over others. The dominant group isolates itself from the needs of other groups, leading to an even bigger separation between groups even within an ethnicity. To overcome this division of society, national identity must be stressed over individual group identity.

==== Deprivation of human needs ====
To alleviate the "underdevelopments" Azar holds responsible for protracted social violence, and in turn overcome the conflict resulting from underdevelopment, Azar points to the needs of security, development, political access and identity in terms of cultural and religious expression. Azar refers to these needs as non-negotiable; therefore, if these needs are not met, people will inevitably want a structural change to take place. Such a need for structural change is likely to result in a violent conflict.

This in turn emphasizes Azar's theory that the "deprivation of human needs is the underlying source of protracted social conflict" where conflict is emphasized by the collective grievances of a group of people. To overcome this deprivation of human needs to entire groups of people, the government must offer security on a multiplicity of levels to all of the constituent population.

==== Governance and the state's role ====
With government being "endowed with the authority to govern and use force where necessary to regulate society, to protect citizens, and to provide collective goods," the government plays a leading role in the satisfaction or lack of satisfaction of minority and identity groups.

Azar states that protracted social conflicts can be characterized by "incompetent, parochial, fragile, and authoritarian governments that fail to satisfy basic human needs." It is said that governments, expected to be unbiased and impartial, tend to be dominated by the leading identity groups or those groups that have been able to monopolize power within a country or territorial entity. This creates a "crisis of legitimacy" in the governance of these countries. The structure of the government needs to be changed so that all citizens are equally cared for and equally represented without bias or corruption.

==== International linkages ====
This involves the "political-economic relations of economic dependency within the international economic system, and the network of political-military linkages constituting regional and global patterns of clientage and cross-border interest."

Weaker states, like those often involved in protracted social conflict, tend to be more influenced by outside connections both economically and politically. For example, many states are dependent on an external supply of armament. To overcome the dominance of the international economy, the country in question must work to build institutions that can ease global dependency and stimulate domestic economic growth.

=== Historical trauma ===
One increasingly discussed cause of protracted social conflict is historical trauma, which is the collection of adverse responses and experiences groups have after being subjected to violence such as colonization, ethnocide, and structural inequalities. In this view, historical trauma is a very common underlying causes of protracted social conflict and is often under-addressed in conflict resolution processes.

== Resolving protracted social conflict ==
As Edward Azar stated:

Reducing overt conflict requires reduction in levels of underdevelopment. Groups that seek to satisfy their identity and security needs through conflict are in effect seeking change in the structure of their society. Conflict resolution can truly occur and last if satisfactory amelioration of underdevelopment occurs as well. Studying protracted conflict leads one to conclude that peace is development in the broadest sense of the term.

Conflict resolution approaches that focus on resources, or the interests of parties, may be appropriate means of conflict resolution in conflicts where the only issues are those of resource and interests; however, in protracted social conflicts the main issue is identity-based. Therefore, to be effective, a conflict resolution framework must specifically emphasize the needs and identities of the conflicting parties.

One conflict resolution model, known as STAR or Strategies for Trauma Awareness and Resilience, may also show promise as a strategy for resolving protracted conflicts: this model specifically emphasizes historical trauma as a root cause of violence.

=== ARIA model ===
Rothman developed a unique approach of conflict resolution that is specifically designed to mitigate protracted social conflict. He terms this approach the ARIA model. In contrast to the model of interactive conflict resolution (ICR) that Fisher proposed in 1996, which includes identity as one of many human needs, the ARIA model "keeps its focus more narrowly attuned to identity issues in particular." Rothman and Olson suggest that conflict can only be truly resolved when identity issues have been sufficiently addressed.

The ARIA model is a comprehensive, yet specific approach to resolving protracted social conflict. It attempts to break down "the barrier of identity through a four-phased process." The various stages of the ARIA model are outlined below:

==== Antagonism (adversarial framing) ====
This first step focuses on the tangible "what of the conflict." It is defined in "us" versus "them" terms and calls on the various entities to elaborate and make clear their underlying values and needs. By bringing animosities to the forefront, it is hoped that the mutual benefits of ending the conflict can be realized.

==== Resonance (reflexive–reframing) ====
After parties have articulated their animosities, the next stage is termed the reflexive–reframing stage where the "why" and "who" of the issue is examined. The identity needs of all sides are brought to the forefront with the goal of getting "the disputants to move from positional bargaining to interest-based approaches." Rothman and Olson suggest that the parties should now engage in a "deep dialogue" to give a voice and structure to the underlying needs of the various parties. The needs of the various parties are, in turn, the underlying causes of the conflict. The effect of this stage is termed resonance, as each side has articulated their core concerns and heard the concerns of the other actors. At this point, actors begin to see where their identities converge, and where they diverge.

==== Invention ====
The third stage is termed "inventing" and focuses on the "how" of "cooperatively resolving the conflict and its core through integrative solutions." This stage suggests a mutual attempt by all actors involved to create a mean of ending the conflict. It is suggested by Rothman and Olson that since both parties have now come to recognize the other's identity through the two previous stages, "they can concretely explore collaboratively how the tangible issues ... of the conflict can be resolved without threatening the identity of the other." The invention of possible means of solutions leads directly to the fourth stage.

==== Action ====
The fourth and final stage of the ARIA model addresses the "why" and "who" of the conflict, as well as the "how" of cooperation through the tangible "what" of solutions. Here, the conflict resolution process based on identity is completed by the concrete outlining of future actions. This stage leads to the tangible resolution of the conflict.

=== STAR model ===
One conflict resolution model, known as STAR or Strategies for Trauma Awareness and Resilience, may also show promise as a strategy for resolving protracted conflicts: this model specifically emphasizes historical trauma as a root cause of violence. The model involves a number of stages which are framed as a spiral, which moves from the initial experience of trauma toward the possibility of reconciliation and includes stages that involve the cultivation of tolerance, engaging offenders, mourning, reflecting on root causes of conflicts, and creating a new group identity through the integration of trauma.

Pumla Madikizela, a South African Truth and Reconciliation Commissioner, is pictured on the left

=== Truth and reconciliation commissions ===
Truth commissions are official groups which are intended to investigate the causes and impacts of human rights abuses and war crimes. They typically give reports that present their findings and that include recommendations about how to repair past harms and prevent future ones.

=== Contact ===
Contact methods involve, quite simply, putting groups who are engaged in protracted conflicts in contact with each other toward reducing hostility and increasing inter-group understanding and tolerance. This strategy of conflict resolution can also involve the use of other models within the broader strategy. There are ongoing questions within the field about the efficacy of this model in situations that involve asymmetrical conflict.

=== Amnesty ===
Amnesty is a tool that is sometimes used in protracted social conflict resolution processes. This is a process where people who have committed crimes are pardoned from the typical legal proceedings and consequences associated with those crimes. This tool is considered controversial, but it can be particularly useful in the course of signing peace agreements.

=== Identity Affirmation ===
The identity affirmation model centers around an intent to disrupt negative views dominant in-groups hold regarding less powerful and more marginalized groups. It uses the same strategies that dominant groups employ to enforce dehumanized and objectified depictions of marginalized groups, and it then turns those strategies around to socially reconstruct the dominant group's view of the humanity of the marginalized group.

== Examples ==
Percentage of Sri Lankan Tamils per district based on 2001 or 1981 (italic) census

=== Sri Lankan Civil War ===
The Sri Lankan conflict exists primarily between the two majority ethnic groups, the Sinhalese, who are mostly Buddhist and represent around 74% of the population, and the Tamil, who are mostly Hindu, representing around 18%. The majority of Tamils live in northern and eastern provinces and claim them as their traditional homeland.

Since its independence in 1948 there has been a conflict between Sinhalese, which gained control over the Sri Lankan government, and different Tamil separatist movements. Among the Sinhalese, the anti-Tamil chauvinism started to spread and the Tamils were more and more disadvantaged and excluded. The incidents escalated into a civil war in July 1983, after the island-wide pogrom against Tamils.

Tamil secessionists saw the establishment of their own separate state as the only way for securing their people. The war, that has continued since then, has almost completely disrupted civil administration in the northern province and caused economic devastation of the whole country. As a consequence of this ethno-political violence around 65,000 people have been killed, hundreds of thousands injured, and millions displaced.

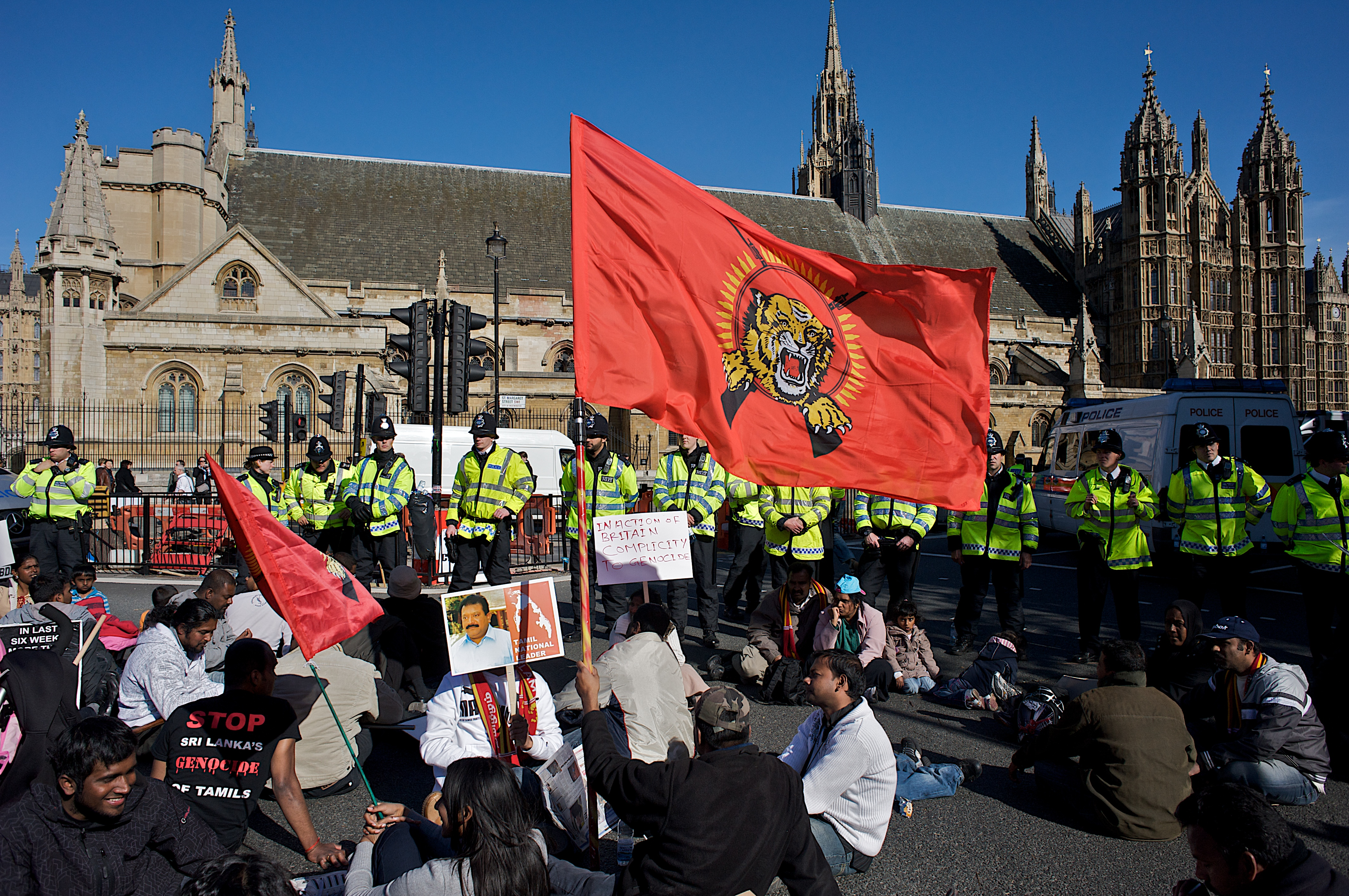
Tamil protesters in Parliament Square (UK) in May 2009 flying the flag of the LTTE, Tamil Tigers.

Among various Tamil separatist groups that have emerged, the Liberation Tigers of Tamil Eelam (LTTE) have risen as the dominant fighting force in Sri Lanka. Their tactics, proscribed as terrorist by many countries, are ruthless, brutal and highly efficient in eliminating their opposition. They run a parallel government in many areas of the north and east of Sri Lanka.

Since the start of war there were some attempts to reach a ceasefire. In 2002 the Ceasefire agreement was signed, and the government agreed to disarm all paramilitary groups in the north and east. But hostilities continued and even intensified.

Government security forces conquered the LTTE on May 19, 2009, ending the conflict.

=== Cyprus Problem ===
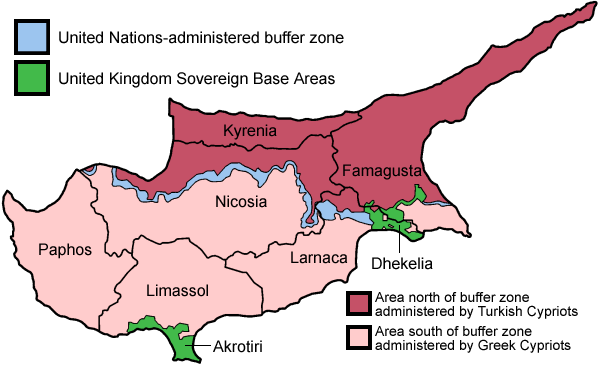
The division of Cyprus

Before the independence of Cyprus, the island's Greek and Turkish communities coexisted relatively peacefully. The major conflict began with the independence in 1960, when members of the Greek community wanted a union (enosis) with Greece, to which the Turkish community opposed. The 1960 constitution brought a complex system of power-sharing, but both groups wanted to gain more advantages.

When Greek Cypriots wanted to reduce autonomy and representation of Turkish Cypriots, the latter opposed it and intercommunal violence broke out. That led the two communities to embark on a hostile and protracted process of separation and segregation.

With the military coup in 1974 the situation erupted into a major crisis. Turkish military intervention followed and Turkish forces occupied around 38% of the northern part of the island. This invasion caused an exodus of about 160,000 Greek Cypriots to the south. Later voluntary regrouping of population resulted in another 10,000 Greek Cypriots leaving the northern part, and 40,000 Turkish Cypriots moving to the north, which created two homogeneous ethnic zones on the island.

In 1975 the northern part declared Turkish Federated State of Cyprus, which declared independence in 1983 as the Turkish Republic of Northern Cyprus, recognized only by Turkey. In 1990s the southern Republic of Cyprus applied for a membership in the European Union, and the Turkish Cypriots on the other side turned to Turkey.

Although the Cyprus conflict has lasted for a long time, its resolution still seems distant. Numerous peace proposals and plans have been made, but they have been more or less unsuccessful. The pre-1974 proposals of different federal or centralist arrangements failed as either one or the other side or the other rejected them.

== See also ==
- Balkanization
- Criticism of multiculturalism
- Homophily
- Sectarian violence
- Social polarization
