= Stephen Ellis (historian) =

British historian and Africanist

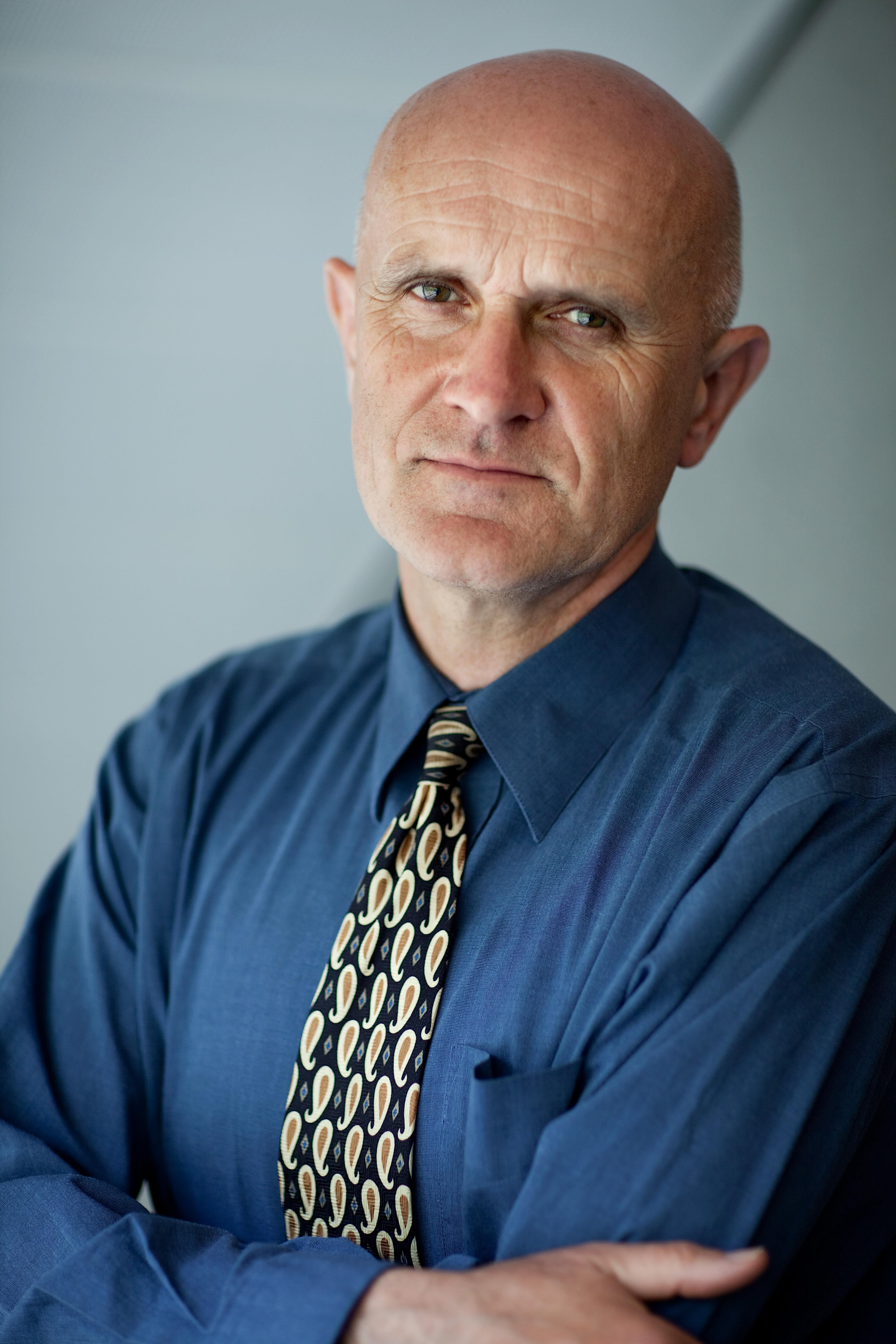
- Stephen Ellis as he took up the Desmond Tutu Chair at the Vrije Universiteit in 2010
- Born: Stephen Ellis; 13 June 1953; Nottingham, England
- Died: 29 July 2015 (aged 62); Amsterdam, Netherlands
- Education: Ph.D., University of Oxford (1981)
- Occupation: Historian

Stephen Ellis (13 June 1953 – 29 July 2015) was a British historian and Africanist whose research focused on post-colonial West Africa and South Africa. He was a former editor of Africa Confidential and African Affairs, a senior researcher at the African Studies Centre Leiden, and a professor at the Vrije Universiteit Amsterdam.

== Life and career ==
Ellis was born in Nottingham, England on 13 June 1953. At the age of 18, he volunteered as a secondary school teacher in Douala, Cameroon. Upon his return to England, he studied modern history at St. Catherine's College, University of Oxford and obtained his doctorate there in 1981. In 1979 and 1980, he was a lecturer at the University of Madagascar, while conducting research for his doctoral thesis on the history of Madagascar. Parts of his thesis became the basis for his first book, published as Rising of the Red Shawls (1985), about the Menalamba rebellion in colonial Madagascar. While writing the book, between 1982 and 1986, he was head of the Africa sub-region at the International Secretariat of Amnesty International in London. Ellis then served as editor of the Africa Confidential newsletter for five years, from 1986 to 1991.

Between 1991 and 1994, Ellis was General Secretary and then Director of the African Studies Centre at Leiden University in the Netherlands. He remained a senior researcher at Leiden until his death, but after 1994 left his administrative role, first to take up an assignment for the Dutch Ministry of Foreign Affairs at the Global Coalition for Africa, which resulted in his next book, Africa Now (1996). From 1997 to 1998, he was a researcher for the South African Truth and Reconciliation Commission. He was appointed editor of journal of the British Royal African Society, African Affairs, in 1998, and retained that position until 2006. In 1999, he published, with Jean-François Bayart and Béatrice Hibou, The Criminalization of the State in Africa, a study of the interaction between privatisation and post-colonial patronage institutions in Africa.

From 2003 to 2004, Ellis was Director of the Africa program of the International Crisis Group, where he expanded the group's reporting on Nigeria and South Africa. In 2008, he was invited to act as an expert witness at the opening of Liberian President Charles Taylor's trial at the Special Court for Sierra Leone in the Hague, and then to give expert testimony at the Sierra Leonean Truth and Reconciliation Commission. The same year, he was appointed Desmond Tutu Professor of Youth, Sport and Reconciliation at the Vrije Universiteit in Amsterdam, where he worked until his death. In 2013, Ellis won the Recht Malan Prize for External Mission: The ANC in Exile (2012), his second book about the South Africa's African National Congress (ANC). He was an advisor to the West Africa Commission on Drugs, chaired by former Nigerian President Olusegun Obasanjo, in 2013 and 2014.

Ellis was married to fellow Africanist Gerrie ter Haar. He died on 29 July 2015 in his home in Amsterdam, having been diagnosed with leukaemia three years earlier. His last book, This Present Darkness (2016), was published posthumously and studies the nature and origins of organised crime in Nigeria. In 2019, Ellis's professional archive was donated to the African Studies Centre in Leiden.

== Controversies ==
=== South Africa ===
While at Africa Confidential, Ellis reported the first accounts of mutinies in the Angolan camps of Umkhonto we Sizwe, the armed wing of the South African ANC, as well as a detailed account of the detention of Pallo Jordan by the ANC's internal security wing, Mbokodo. These reports were elaborated in Ellis's Comrades against Apartheid: The ANC and the South African Communist Party in Exile (1992), which was co-authored by Oyama Mabandla (under the pseudonym Tsepo Sechaba), a former member of Mbokodo and of the South African Communist Party (SACP) in exile. The book was unpopular with the ANC for its account of abuses in the exile camps, but many of Ellis's allegations were later confirmed in the final report of the Truth and Reconciliation Commission. Ellis's External Mission (2012) was also about the ANC in exile and revisited earlier themes, particularly concerning the ANC's intimacy with the SACP. The book also claimed to provide evidence for the long-controversial claim that former South African President Nelson Mandela had been a member of the Central Committee of the SACP. This ignited heated debate, but Ellis's claim about Mandela was ultimately confirmed true by the SACP itself, following Mandela's death in 2013.

=== Liberia ===
Ellis's The Mask of Anarchy (2001), about the Liberian civil war, was shortlisted for the African Studies Association's Herskovits Award, but caused a minor scandal in West Africa when newspapers reported on the book's claim that Liberian warlord Charles Taylor engaged in ritual cannibalism. Some commentators labelled the book racist; and Taylor, then Liberian President, sued Ellis in a London court, but later withdrew the charges. Equally controversial, Ellis's later published an article in Foreign Affairs, entitled "How to Rebuild Africa", which construed Liberia as a prime example of a "failed state" in Africa and argued that such states should be brought under a new form of international trusteeship.

== Selected publications ==
His publications include:

- Ellis, Stephen (1985). The Rising of the Red Shawls: A Revolt in Madagascar, 1895–1899. Cambridge: Cambridge University Press. ISBN 0-521-26287-9. OCLC 240094712.
  - Ellis, Stephen (1998). L'insurrection des Menalamba une révolte à Madagascar, 1895-1899. Hommes et sociétés (in French). Translated by Randriambeloma-Rakotoanosy, Ginette. Paris: Karthala. ISBN 9782865377961. OCLC 708351677. Thesis 282 pages. Preface by Faranirina V. Rajaonah.
- Ellis, Stephen (1990). Un complot colonial à Madagascar: l'affaire Rainandriamampandry (in French). Paris: Karthala Editions. ISBN 978-2-86537-160-0. OCLC 901606584.
- Ellis, Stephen; Sechaba, Tsepo (1992). Comrades Against Apartheid: The ANC and the South African Communist Party in Exile. London and Bloomington: James Currey and Indiana University Press. ISBN 9780253318381. OCLC 23768989.
- Ellis, Stephen, ed. (1996). Africa Now: People, Policies and Institutions. The Hague, London, and Portsmouth, N.H.: Netherlands Ministry of Foreign Affairs, James Currey, Heinemann. ISBN 0-435-08987-0. OCLC 898931540.
- Ellis, Stephen; Bayart, Jean-François; Hibou, Béatrice (1998). La criminalisation de l'État en Afrique. Espace international, 23 (in French). Bruxelles: Éditions Complexe. ISBN 9782870276747. OCLC 264968105. 167 pages. Copyright 1997.
  - Ellis, Stephen; Bayart, Jean-François; Hibou, Béatrice (1999). The Criminalization of the State in Africa. African issues. London and Bloomington: International African Institute in association with James Currey, Indiana University Press. ISBN 978-0-253-21286-3. OCLC 39695948.
- Ellis, Stephen (2007). The Mask of Anarchy: The Destruction of Liberia and the Religious Dimension of an African Civil War (2nd ed.). New York: New York University Press. ISBN 9780814722381. OCLC 83259970. Second edition, revised and updated with a new preface. First edition was at London: Hurst, 2001.
- Ellis, Stephen; ter Haar, Gerrie (2004). Worlds of Power: Religious Thought and Political Practice in Africa. New York: Oxford University Press. ISBN 9780195220179. OCLC 635822491.
- Ellis, Stephen (April 2009). "West Africa's International Drug Trade". African Affairs. 108 (431): 171–196. doi:10.1093/afraf/adp017. hdl:1887/13818. ISSN 0001-9909. JSTOR 27667118.
- Ellis, Stephen; Tutu, Desmond (2012). Season of Rains: Africa in the World. Chicago: University of Chicago Press. ISBN 9780226205595. OCLC 741937796.
- Ellis, Stephen (2012). External Mission: The ANC in Exile, 1960–1990. London: Hurst & Company. ISBN 9781849042628. OCLC 796280138..
  - Ellis, Stephen (2022). External Mission: The ANC in Exile, 1960–1990 (2nd ed.). Johannesburg: Jonathan Ball. ISBN 9781776192199. OCLC 1335465107. Foreword by Max du Preez.
- Ellis, Stephen (2016). This Present Darkness: A History of Nigerian Organised Crime. London: Hurst & Company. ISBN 9781787380271. OCLC 1030592296.
- Ellis, Stephen (2020). Kelsall, Tim; Randrianja, Solofo; Bayart, Jean-François (eds.). Charlatans, Spirits and Rebels in Africa: The Stephen Ellis Reader. New York, NY: Oxford University Press. ISBN 9780197661611. OCLC 1311157379.

== See also ==
- History of the African National Congress
