= Rufus Akinyele =

Nigerian professor of history and university administrator

Rufus Taiwo Akinyele
- Born: 2 February 1959 (age 67); Ido Ekiti, Nigeria
- Other name: R. T. Akinyele
- Spouse: Olayide Ibironke Akinyele
- Children: 3

Academic background
- Education: University of Lagos, Nigeria
- Thesis: "States Creation and Boundary Adjustments in Nigeria, 1900-1987: A Study in the Approach to the Problems of Ethnic Minority Groups in Nigeria" (1990)
- Doctoral advisor: Akinjide Osuntokun
- Influences: Akinjide Osuntokun, A. I. Asiwaju

Academic work
- Discipline: African history, inter-group relations and border studies
- Institutions: University of Lagos, Nigeria
- Doctoral students: Irene Osemeka, Lanre Davies

Rufus Taiwo Akinyele (born 2 February 1959) is a Nigerian professor of African History at the University of Lagos, and the Vice Chancellor of Maranatha University, Lagos. His research interests cut across the fields of African history, inter-group relations and border studies, and he has published numerous articles in several peer-reviewed journals in these areas. With his studies on the Oodua Peoples' Congress among others, he has earned recognition as one of the leading authorities on ethnic militia across the world. Akinyele is the convener of the International Multidisciplinary Conference on ‘Land and Development’ at the University of Lagos.

== Background ==
Born on 2 February 1959, Akinyele obtained his secondary (WASC) and higher secondary certificates (HSC) from the Nigerian Military School, Zaria and the Igbobi College, Lagos in 1977 and 1979 respectively. He then proceeded to the University of Lagos, where he earned his B.A., M.A. and Ph.D. degrees in history in 1982, 1985 and 1990 respectively. Immediately afterwards, in January 1990, his alma mater engaged him as a Lecturer II in the Department of History, where he continues to serve having risen through the ranks to the point of his appointment as a full Professor on October 1, 2005.

== Career ==
Rufus Akinyele has been a two-time Head of the Department of History and Strategic Studies, University of Lagos, first from September 2010 through August 2013, and from March 2017 through July 2020. He has authored several book chapters and a number of books/monographs, as well as edited several volumes. Scores of his influential articles have appeared in high-impact disciplinary or regional academic journals such as African Affairs, Asian and African Studies, African Studies Review and Africa Development. His current research explores different issues relating to land and development in Lagos. Rufus Akinyele has participated in and delivered scholarly papers in numerous academic conferences and workshops as well as at other non-academic fora within Nigeria and in several other countries including the United States, Germany, France, United Kingdom, South Africa, Tanzania, Kenya and Ghana. He was a participant at the workshop on the Review of UNESCO General History of Africa in Cape Coast, Ghana in 2013.

Akinyele teaches undergraduate and graduate courses in African and European Historiography, African and European Political Thought, Colonialism, Ethnic Conflicts and Border Studies at the University of Lagos' Department of History and Strategic Studies. He has successfully supervised over 25 graduate students including seven doctoral students. In 2015, he was a visiting professor at the Obafemi Awolowo University, Ile Ife.

In 2004, Akinyele held office as the Director of Centre for African Regional Integration and Border Studies (CARIBS) at the University of Lagos. He was a member of the Editorial Advisory Board of African Affairs (Oxford) from 2008 through 2017; and has been a member of the editorial board of the Lagos Historical Review, a history journal domiciled in the Department of History and Strategic Studies, University of Lagos since 2001. He has been a Reviewer/Advisor of the African Humanities Programme of the American Council of Learned Societies since 2012. And since 2013, Akinyele has been the Chief Editor of UNILAG Journal of Humanities.

In October 2022, Akinyele was appointed the Vice Chancellor of Maranatha University, Lagos with effect from October 10, 2022.

Rufus Akinyele is a member of the following academic professional organisations: American Studies Association of Nigeria, International Research Group (GDRI), France; National Association for Ethnic Studies, United States; African Borderlands Research Network (ABORNE); and the Congress of African Historians.

== Selected publications ==
- Akinyele, R. T., Nigeria: Contesting for Space, Identity and Security, (Ibadan: Rex Charles, 2014).
- Akinyele, R. T., History and Diplomacy: Essays in Honour of Ade Adefuye (Glasboro, NJ: Goldline and Jacobs Pub., 2017).
- Akinyele, Rufus; Dietz, Ton, eds. (2019-05-15). Crime, Law and Society in Nigeria: Essays in Honour of Stephen Ellis. Brill. doi:10.1163/9789004396289. ISBN 978-90-04-39628-9.
- Akinyele, Rufus T. (2009-01-01), "Contesting for space in an urban centre: The Omo Onile Syndrome in Lagos", African Cities, Brill, pp. 109–133, doi:10.1163/ej.9789004162648.i-308.34, ISBN 978-90-474-4248-6
- Akinyele, R. T., Julie Berg, et al., "Contested Social Orders: Negotiating Urban Security in Nigeria and South Africa," in Simon Bekker and Laurent Fourchard (eds.), Governing Cities in Africa: Politics and Policies (Cape Town: HSRC Press, 2013), 169–188.
- Akinyele, R. T., "A Western Niger Province or Constitutional Safeguards: The Search for an Effective Remedy to the Fears of the Igbo West of the Niger 1941-54," Immigrants and Minorities 2 (1992): 156–170.
- Akinyele, R. T. (1996). "States Creation in Nigeria: The Willink Report in Retrospect". African Studies Review. 39 (2): 71–94. doi:10.2307/525436. ISSN 0002-0206. JSTOR 525436.
- Akinyele, R.T. (2000-07-01). "7 - Power-sharing and Conflict Management in Africa: Nigeria, Sudan and Rwanda". Africa Development. 25 (3–4). doi:10.4314/ad.v25i3.22107. ISSN 0850-3907.
- Akinyele, R. T. (2001). "Ethnic Militancy and National Stability in Nigeria: A Case Study of the Oodua People's Congress". African Affairs. 100 (401): 623–640. doi:10.1093/afraf/100.401.623. ISSN 0001-9909. JSTOR 3518704.
