= Gatekeeper state =

The concept of a gatekeeper state was popularized by Historian Frederick Cooper in his book Africa Since 1940: The Past of the Present. It is used to describe African nations whose main function is balancing the instability of internal political control against the influence of external factors.

== Concept ==
Cooper stated that his argument "intended more to provoke discussion than to be learned," and that, "like all two-word descriptions, ‘gatekeeper state’ is more useful for questions it suggests than for supplying an explanation in itself."

According to Cooper, African governments suffer from a peculiar politico-economic dysfunction that derives from a particular historical sequence. Specifically, he contends "Africa was systematically conquered but not so systematically ruled" (2002: 196–197) and hence "colonial states had been gate-keeper states" (ibid.: 5) which had "trouble extending their power and their command of people’s respect... inward" (ibid.: 156) but could control "the interface of national and world economies" (ibid.: 141).

Colonial powers mainly sought to extract resources from Africa (e.g. natural resources, labor) which resulted in limited political foundation in territories. Ultimately, the authority of colonial regimes depended on the superior military forces of the metropole, which could easily defeat organized resistance but could neither routinize authority nor gain legitimacy (ibid.: 157).

Over the course of African history, replacement of colonial leaders with native African leaders did little to gain support or stability among constituents. The survival of each colony therefore still depended on external resources and support, not on internal factors as in established states. Due to weak internal control, this external dependence produced an outward orientation focused on ‘guarding the gate’: gatekeepers collected most of their revenues from taxes on imports and exports, controlled entry and exit visas, distributed foreign aid, decided who could move currency in or out, and issued licenses that determined who could engage in business activities (2002.: 5, 97, 157).

The post-colonial "successor states," Cooper goes on to argue, inherited the mantle of gate-keeper from their former rulers. Independence, however, greatly exacerbated the negative consequences of gate-keeping because whereas before it was taken for granted who would control the gate (along with the power and wealth derived therefrom), in the post-colonial period there was no external military force to impose order.

Furthermore, unlike the colonial powers (at least before the "development era" after about 1940) African rulers wanted to impose their authority internally in order to affect a far-reaching transformation of the economy and society. And given, moreover, that control of the gate was an "either/or phenomenon" (ibid.: 159) or a zero-sum game, the stakes of control were extremely high because the winners gained control of resources they could use to entrench their rule. Consequently, fierce competition for control of the gate arose soon after independence, and this resulted in the collectively irrational political instability that occurred in Africa after independence as evidenced by, among other things, cycles of coups and counter coups.

== History ==
The longer history of the concept is documented by Aharon deGrassi. Cooper first used the term in May 1992. Cooper draws on other mentions of the term "gate-keeper," especially the influential book The State in Africa, published in French in 1989 and in English in 1993, which stated "In Nigeria in the 1970s, General Obasanjo popularised the term 'gatekeeper' to describe the senior civil servants' intermediary role between the international environment and the national market." Bayart in turn took the term from an earlier 1978 chapter on Nigeria by Gavin Williams and Teresa Turner.

== Critiques ==
The concept has been subject to various critiques. The concept relies on a spatial metaphor rather than actual geographic analysis. It relies on four problematic assumptions : "taxation as fiscal and indirect, rural areas as residual, infrastructure as narrow and static, and infrastructural protest as most significant." Cooper does not provide specific thorough statistical evidence for his main claim about "centrality of tariffs, as opposed to other kinds of taxes, to state revenue." Statistics from other studies contradict this statement for some countries in parts of the colonial period.

== See also ==
- State (polity)
- Politics of the belly
- Neopatrimonialism

== Sources ==
- Cooper, Frederick (2002). Africa since 1940: The past of the present. Cambridge: Cambridge University Press.
- Cooper, Frederick (2008). L'Afrique depuis 1940. Paris: Payot.
