= The Man =

Slang phrase

"The Man" is a slang phrase, mainly used in the United States, to refer to figures of authority, including members of the government. Though typically used as a derogatory connotation, the phrase may also be used as a term of respect or praise. The phrase "the Man is keeping me down" is commonly used to describe oppression, while the phrase "stick it to the Man" encourages civil resistance to authority figures.

== History ==
In the Hebrew Bible, the Hebrew phrase "Ha Ish" (meaning 'the Man') is used by Joseph's brothers to refer to his position as the viceroy of Egypt. As an English language phrase meaning "the boss", the phrase dates back to 1918. In the Southern United States, the phrase came to be applied to any person or group in a position of authority, or to the concept of authority in abstract terms. From the 1950s onwards, the phrase was also a code word used among the American underworld for law enforcement in the United States. The term is used several times by Paul Newman's eponymous character in the 1967 prison drama Cool Hand Luke and by Peter Fonda's character in the Wild Angels in "We wanna be free to ride our machines without being hassled by The Man."

The use of this term was expanded to counterculture groups and their resistance to authority, such as the Yippies, which, according to a May 19, 1969 article in the U.S. News & World Report, had the "avowed aim ... to destroy 'The Man', their term for the present system of government". The term eventually found its way into humorous usage, such as in a December 1979 motorcycle ad from the magazine Easyriders which featured the tagline: "California residents: Add 6% sales tax for The Man." In the 1969 song "Proud Mary" by Creedence Clearwater Revival, the singer finds protection from "the man" and salvation from his working-class pains in the nurturing spirit and generosity of simple people who "are happy to give" even "if you have no money."

In present day, the phrase has been popularized in commercials and cinema. It was featured particularly prominently as a recurring motif in the 2003 film School of Rock. The film Undercover Brother had as a plot element a fictional organization headed by "The Man", an actual man in charge of oppressing African Americans. In January 2021, the GameStop short squeeze was primarily triggered to "fight the man" by users of the subreddit r/wallstreetbets, an Internet forum on the social news website Reddit, some of whom held anger towards Wall Street hedge funds for their role in the 2008 financial crisis, and the general democratization of the stock market coupled with the ability of retail traders to communicate instantaneously through social media.

=== Use as praise ===
The term has also been used as an approbation or form of praise. This may refer to the recipient's status as the leader or authority within a particular context, who is afraid of other people in society, or it might be assumed to be a shortened form of a phrase like "He is the man (who is in charge)." In more modern usage, it can be a superlative compliment ("you da man!") indicating that the subject is currently standing out amongst their peers even though they have no special designation or rank, such as a basketball player who is performing better than the other players on the court. It can also be used as a genuine compliment with an implied, slightly exaggerated or sarcastic tone, usually indicating that the person has indeed impressed the speaker but by doing something relatively trivial. The phrase has also been used in professional wrestling to refer to the top stars in the business. Some notable examples include Ric Flair, Stan Hansen, and Becky Lynch.

== See also ==
- Big Brother (Nineteen Eighty-Four)
- Big man (political science)
- Ruling class
- The Establishment
- Power elite

== Sources ==
- Lighter, J.E. (Ed.). (1997). Random House Dictionary of American Slang. New York: Random House.
