= Laurent Fourchard =

French historian and political scientist

- Occupations: Professor, historian, political scientist
- Awards: LSA Distinguished Scholar Award

Academic background
- Education: MPhil./PhD., African History, University of Paris 7
- Thesis: "Espaces, pouvoirs et sociétés à Ouagadougou et à Bobo-Dioulasso, Haute-Volta, fin 19ème siècle-1960" (Spaces, Powers and Societies in Ouagadougou and Bobo-Dioulasso, Upper Volta, Late 19th century – 1960) (2000)
- Doctoral advisor: Catherine Coquery-Vidrovitch

Academic work
- Discipline: History, Political Science
- Institutions: French National Foundation for Political Science (FNSP), Centre for International Relations (CERI), Urban School of Sciences Po Paris
- Main interests: Socio-political history of urbanism in Africa
- Notable works: Classify, Exclude, Police: Urban Lives in South Africa and Nigeria; Trier, exclure et policer: Vies urbaines en Afrique du Sud et au Nigeria

Laurent Fourchard (born 1966) is a French historian and political scientist at the National Foundation for Political Science (FNSP)'s Centre for International Relations (CERI) and at the Urban School of Sciences Po Paris, where he is a research professor. His research and publications explore the themes of crime and violence, security and vigilantism, urbanism and governance of metropolises, urban transport and transport unionism, political sociology of Nigeria and South Africa, and the history and historiography of contemporary Africa. In June 2023, Fourchard won the Distinguished Scholar Award of the Lagos Studies Association.

== Education ==
Fourchard obtained a Master of Philosophy in history at University of Paris 7 (now Paris Diderot University) in 1995. He earned his doctorate degree in African history at the same university in 2000 under the supervision of Catherine Coquery-Vidrovitch. He then received a Habilitation (HDR) in political science from Sciences Po Paris in 2014, under the guaranteeship of Jean François Bayart and Frederick Cooper.

== Career ==
Upon completing his PhD., Fourchard was appointed as Director of the French Institute for Research in Africa in Nigeria (IFRA-Nigeria), in the University of Ibadan, from 2000 to 2003. Before joining CERI in 2016, he was a research fellow at the Les Afriques dans le monde research institute at Sciences Po Bordeaux. In 2008 and 2009 he was visiting scholar at the University of Cape Town, Nuffield College, University of Oxford (2010, 2023), University of Turin (2020), and Columbia University (2022).

Fourchard has authored 3 monographs, and well over 50 journals articles and book chapters in English and French languages. His most recent book is Classify, Exclude, Police: Urban Lives in South Africa and Nigeria, which was released in 2021 as the English version of his French monograph, Trier, exclure et policer: Vies urbaines en Afrique du Sud et au Nigeria which was released in 2018.

Fourchard combines the methodologies of history and ethnography to deliver compelling comparative analyses of the urban politics of social categorization and policing in Nigerian and South African cities.

At different points in his career, Fourchard has edited or been on the editorial boards of the following high-impact journals: Africa, Journal of African History, International Journal of Urban and Regional Research and Politique africaine.

== Selected publications ==
- Fourchard, Laurent; Sikiru, Azeez Kayode (2023). "The 2023 Cashless Election in Nigeria: The Politics of Withdrawing Money". African Affairs. 122 (488): 429–445. doi:10.1093/afraf/adad019. ISSN 0001-9909.
- Fourchard, Laurent (2023-01-02). "Expanding profit and power. The National Union of Road Transport Workers in Nigeria". Canadian Journal of Development Studies / Revue canadienne d'études du développement. 44 (1): 97–112. doi:10.1080/02255189.2022.2132924. ISSN 0225-5189. S2CID 253616459.
- Fourchard, Laurent (2021-04-19). Classify, Exclude, Police: Urban Lives in South Africa and Nigeria. John Wiley & Sons. ISBN 978-1-119-58262-5.
- Fourchard, Laurent (2021). "Undocumented citizens and the making of ID documents in Nigeria: an ethnography of the politics of suspicion in Jos". African Affairs. 120 (481): 511–541. doi:10.1093/afraf/adab022.
- Fourchard, Laurent (2018). Trier, exclure et policer: Vies urbaines en Afrique du Sud et au Nigeria (in French). Paris: Les Presses de Sciences Po. ISBN 978-2-7246-2320-8.
- Fourchard, Laurent (2015). "Bureaucrats and Indigenes: Producing and Bypassing Certificates of Origin in Nigeria". Africa. 85 (1): 37–58. doi:10.1017/S0001972014000734. ISSN 0001-9720. S2CID 144770285.
- Fourchard, Laurent (2012-03-01). "Security and party politics in Cape Town". Geoforum. SI - Party Politics, the Poor and the City: reflections from South Africa. 43 (2): 199–206. doi:10.1016/j.geoforum.2011.12.002. ISSN 0016-7185.
- Fourchard, Laurent (2008). "A New Name for an Old Practice: Vigilantes in South-Western Nigeria". Africa. 78 (1): 16–40. doi:10.3366/E000197200800003X. ISSN 1750-0184. S2CID 17939390.
- Fourchard, Laurent (2007). "Violences et ordre politique au Nigeria". Politique Africaine (in French). 106 (2): 4–27. doi:10.3917/polaf.106.0004. ISSN 0244-7827.
- Fourchard, Laurent (2006). "Lagos and the Invention of Juvenile Delinquency in Nigeria, 1920-60". The Journal of African History. 47 (1): 115–137. doi:10.1017/S0021853705001660. ISSN 1469-5138. S2CID 37102680.
- Fourchard, Laurent (2004). "L'histoire urbaine en Afrique : une perspective ouest-africaine". Histoire urbaine (in French). 9 (1): 129–144. doi:10.3917/rhu.009.0129. ISSN 1628-0482.
