= Political decay =

Political theory

Political decay is a political theory, originally described in 1965 by Samuel P. Huntington, which describes how chaos and disorder can arise from social modernization increasing more rapidly than political and institutional modernization. Huntington provides different definitions for political development and describes the forms of political decay according to the various definitions. Huntington focuses primarily on political development as modernization and institutionalization. However, he points to the different definitions of political development as being arbitrary ways to understanding the rise of political systems and the relationship between the political systems of different nations.

Political decay is a widespread ailment that affects every society.

== Political development ==
Huntington identifies two characteristics of political development. The first is that development is synonymous with modernization; thus, political development can be defined as political modernization. The second is that there are many criteria to measure political development because modernization and development are such broad topics, covering many areas. There are four generally agreed-upon criteria to determine political development. The first is rationalization, which involves the movement from particularism to universalism, or, from a political standpoint, a focus on functional differentiation and achievement criteria. The second criterion is nationalism, and national integration. This emphasizes nation-states and nation-building as a key aspect of political development. The third criterion is a focus on democratization, which is in essence a focus on competition and equalization of power. The final criterion is mobilization, which is a focus on political participation. The greater the development, the greater the modernization, the greater the mobilization, and therefore the greater the political participation. Ultimately, political development can be defined as an increase in national political unity and an increase in political participation.

=== Modernization ===
According to Huntington's definition of political development as modernization, political decay is the opposite of the linear idea of social progress—although, within the model of modernization, social regression is not possible. Instead, political decay takes place because "modern and modernizing states can change by losing capabilities as well as by gaining them. In addition, a gain in any one capability usually involves costs in others." The model of modernization was used to compare the political systems of different countries with social development reflecting the linear progression of political institutions. However, research into the relationship between development of political institutions and modernization has pointed to inconsistent development. In some political systems, such as certain Latin American regions, governments have been influenced by military intervention as a result of the government's inability to cope with the strains of modernization.

=== Institutional ===
Under the framework of political development as institutional development, political decay occurs when institutions fail to change or adapt when they become unnecessary due to social or economic changes. Dan Halvorson challenges the idea of political decay as an institutional failure by claiming that the idea of political decay is tied to a Western ideal of political institution without taking into account widely-varying cultural institutions and the inability of post-colonial states to adapt to Western ideals. Francis Fukuyama refers to political decay as the social and economic forces that upset the equilibrium of established political order. Institutions of the Roman Empire government failed to meet the moral and economic needs of the citizens, resulting in the conditions that would facilitate political decay and the fall of the Roman state. Under the institutional model, political decay can be observed as a decrease in competence, credibility and establishment of institutional corruption over a period of time.

== Instability ==
Different social and economic factors contribute to both the political development as well as the political decay of nations. Outside forces such as foreign governments affect the stability of established governments due to contrasting social institutions or economic interests. In order to be considered stable, government procedures and institutions must maintain autonomy and be resistant to outside agents. The social and economic forces that established political stability could change or disappear, leading to internal instability. Economic development, such as shifts from agriculture-based economy to manufacturing-based economy, as well as economic collapse, can also lead to political instability. Social developments, such as the proliferation of literacy, lead to the rise and spread of new ideas.

=== Political instability ===
Political instability occurs when one faction in a state's government is in opposition with another faction or with another institution in the government. Political instability occurred during the late 18th century in France and other parts of Europe during the 19th century. Political development in France, such as the development of the bureaucracy and other institutions, led to a greater demand for meritocracy and greater political conflict among the ruling class. Sri Lanka saw a period of political instability following elections in 1994 caused by the ambitions of political leaders. The elected president Chandrika Kumaratunga attempted to change the constitution and dissolve the parliament in order to remain in power, leading to sudden changes in the structure of the law-making body.

In some cases, a political breakdown can occur within the framework of a state's constitution. India has provisions in its constitution which grant leaders the power to breach or oppose the constitution in cases of emergency. These breaches of the state law from within the political system can lead to political decay.

=== Social developments ===
Huntington's model of political development and decay describes elements such as industrialization, urbanization, education and literacy as social developments that create instability. The presence of violent conflict is not always indicative of social decay. Due to the complex character of state-building and shifts in political systems, violence is not a reliable indicator of political decay or development. The socialization of law is a process by which legislation is changed in order to adapt to economic and social changes. Socialization of law is one of the forces that opposes political decay within Huntington's structure of modernization, by ensuring that the political institutions in place are resistant to social instability.

== Updated by Fukuyama ==
Huntington's former student, Francis Fukuyama, has developed the theory of political decay by analysing the sclerosis of democratic institutions in the United States and elsewhere. He argues that political institutions have been too slow to keep up with the country's changing circumstances due to their institutional inertia behind a status quo. For example, in the United States, the emerging financial oligarchy is entrenching income and wealth inequality and reducing social mobility which is leading to a breakdown in society, the social contract and confidence in the government. The second of Fukuyama's two volumes on political order, Political Order and Political Decay (2014), echoes the title of Huntington's seminal 1965 essay. Fukuyama focuses on the concept of political decay in the framework of a history of the rise and fall of Chinese dynasties and the causes of political and social stability during each dynasty as well as in Russian and Islamic governments.
