= Corruption in the Democratic Republic of the Congo =

Corruption in the Democratic Republic of the Congo is widespread at all levels of government, ranging from petty bribery involving local bureaucrats to grand-scale embezzlement of public funds by political elites. Transparency International's Corruption Perceptions Index, which measures how effectively countries are perceived to control public-sector corruption, consistently ranks the DRC near the bottom. The BBC's DRC country profile calls its recent history "one of civil war and corruption." A 2024 report by Transparency International described the DRC as the eighth most corrupt country in Africa. President Joseph Kabila established the Commission of Repression of Economic Crimes upon his ascension to power in 2001.

== History ==
=== The Mobutu era (1965–1997) ===
Mobutu Sese Seko ruled Zaire from 1965 to 1997, looting his country's wealth for personal use to such a degree that critics coined the term "kleptocracy". After Congo became independent from Belgium in 1960, Seko was appointed Secretary of State by Patrice Lumumba, who was elected as the country’s first prime minister. Political infighting prompted Seko to launch two coups, the second of which installed him as Congo’s leader in 1965. Mobutu himself would maintain that he claimed five years of absolute power to quell opposition to his rule and “revert the damage done by politicians”.

Significant cases of corruption in Congo began to emerge during his regime, which lasted until 1997. In order to establish and maintain his grip on power, he instituted a system of bribery and patronage. State funds and resources were used to secure the loyalty of his military officials, politicians, and Congo’s elite.

This can be demonstrated in the “Zaireanization” policy he implemented during the 1970s, which involved the nationalization of foreign-owned businesses. Seko handed these enterprises to his cronies who did not have the expertise to effectively operate said organizations. He also siphoned billions of dollars of state funds for personal use. A relative once explained how the government illicitly collected revenue: "Mobutu would ask one of us to go to the bank and take out a million. We'd go to an intermediary and tell him to get five million. He would go to the bank with Mobutu's authority, and take out ten. Mobutu got one, and we took the other nine." The Congolese explained the lack of support from the government by the humorous article 15: Débrouillez-vous ("Figure it yourself").

Seko, widely considered one of Africa's most corrupt leaders, embezzled an estimated $5 billion from his country's revenues, contributing to its persistent poverty. Mobutu institutionalized corruption to prevent political rivals from challenging his control, leading to an economic collapse in 1996. Mobutu allegedly amassed between US$50 million and $125 million during his rule.

His regime also notoriously diverted foreign aid intended for development projects into his personal accounts. International support, fueled by his staunch anti-communist stance during the Cold War, enabled his long tenure.

=== The Kabila Era (1997–2019) ===
Laurent Kabila led an insurgent group against Mobutu and quickly assumed power after Mobutu was overthrown. During this time period, Kabila issued a statement making himself president with near absolute power in the government. With people supporting him for overthrowing Mobutu, he was not initially met with much public opposition. However, Kabila's and his government's goals for the regime were said to be unclear and vague.

He refused immediate elections in fear of the country returning to Mobutuism, and continued to postpone promised elections. The constitution was not changed, and he and his peers exploited resources for their personal benefit. Laurent Kabila led a regime that upheld corruption through clientelism by appointing his clients as cabinet members. Under the Kabila regime, the DRC has failed to pull itself out of its "collapsed state" status from when Mobutu was in power.

The government has not implemented security and human rights reforms, free media, and the decentralization of power. The economy plummeted, forcing workers to be underpaid and living conditions to deteriorate. Laurent Kabila was killed in 2001 by one of his body guards in an attempted coup d'état.

During that time period, The Democratic Republic of Congo received a score of 1.9 out of 10 in the Corruption Perception Index, which reveals high levels of corruption.

His son, Joseph Kabila was elected president after Laurent Kabila's death. Joseph Kabila is working with the World Bank to curtail corruption and improve economy. In addition, the Commission of Economic Crimes was implemented in 2001 by President Joseph Kabila. Nonetheless, there are still reports of high-ranking officials exploiting resources for their personal benefit and other forms of corruption. In 2006, the constitution changed the president's minimum age from 35 to 30 years old to include Joseph Kabila, who was 33 at the time.

Joseph Kabila was also implicated in a corruption scandal known as the so-called "Congo Hold-Up" expose. In a series of leaked documents obtained and published by the media and the Platform to Protect Whistleblowers in Africa, it was revealed that Kabila and his family may have engaged in a kleptocratic system that diverted funds from the country’s Central Bank, state-owned companies, the national treasure, and the national electoral commission. It is alleged that they pocketed at least $138 million from 2013 to 2018. Authorities have confirmed an ongoing investigation of the corruption.

In 2017, Reuters exposed a scheme involving overpriced biometric passports.

=== Tshisekedi presidency (2019–) ===
Transparency International wrote in 2024 that the General Inspectorate of Finance (IGF) in President Felix Tshisekedi's administration had been spearheading the president's increased anti-corruption efforts over the previous five years. In June 2020, a court found President Tshisekedi's own chief of staff Vital Kamerhe guilty of corruption. He was sentenced to 20 years' hard labor, after facing charges of embezzling almost $50m (£39m) of public funds. He was the most high-profile figure to be convicted of corruption in the DRC. However, Kamerhe was released already in December 2021.

In November 2021, a judicial investigation targeting former president Joseph Kabila and his associates was opened in Kinshasa after revelations of alleged embezzlement of $138 million.

=== Systemic corruption ===
Graft and corrupt practices were not limited to Seko and his inner circle. His military officers also engage in these practices. For instance, military officers often illegally appropriate for their own use the resources allocated to their troops. Members of the judiciary also decide on cases based on wealth, social, and political status. They also use the courts for revenge and to settle personal scores.

Other practices perpetuated by government officials include the practice of "ghost employees" or non-existent workers in the payrolls of state-owned enterprises. This is the same in the case of government institutions as officials that have supervisory authority engage in the same practice. Corruption was also rampant in the customs and excise departments, which were known for abating and colluding with those engaged in large-scale smuggling operations.

== Impact ==
Corruption still remains as high as it was during the Mobutu regime. It is practiced in all levels of society and these include petty bribery, grand corruption, and illicit financial flows. There are existing anti-corruption frameworks but these are hampered by weak implementation, lack of political will and transparency as well as entrenched interests and a culture of impunity. For these reasons, Congo remain underdeveloped, primarily affecting its people, who suffer very high rates of poverty and deprivation.

Data obtained by the United Nations' Food and Agriculture Organization (FAO), for instance, showed that about a quarter of the population in Congo or 25.6 million people experience acute hunger. This is expected to continue until 2025 if not addressed. The government is also unable to provide its citizens with basic public goods and services such as health care, clean water, electricity, and law and order.

=== Corruption Perceptions Index ===
Year	Score	Worldwide Average Score	Rank
2017	21	43	161
2018	20	43	161
2019	18	43	168
2020	18	43	170
2021	19	43	169
2022	20	43	166
2023	20	43	162
2024	20	43	163
2025	20	42	163

The table above shows how the Democratic Republic of the Congo fared in nine successive years of Transparency International's ranking of 180 countries (from 2017-2024) or 182 countries (2025) in the Corruption Perceptions Index. Countries are scored on a scale from 0 ("highly corrupt") to 100 ("very clean") and then ranked by score; the country ranked first is perceived to have the most honest public sector.

== See also ==
- Resource Extraction in the Democratic Republic of the Congo
- Democratic Republic of the Congo passport
- Corruption in Angola

General:

- Crime in the Democratic Republic of the Congo
- Kleptocracy
- International Anti-Corruption Academy
- Group of States against Corruption
- International Anti-Corruption Day
- ISO 37001 Anti-bribery management systems
- United Nations Convention Against Corruption
- OECD Anti-Bribery Convention
- Transparency International
