= Politics of the belly =

Concept in African political science

Politics of the belly, a translation of the French term politique du ventre, is a Cameroonian expression popularised by Jean-François Bayart in his 1989 book L'État en Afrique: La Politique du Ventre to describe African political power in the post-colonial era. It refers, in particular, to the relationship between patrimonialism, clientelism, corruption, and power. According to Lynn M. Thomas of the University of Washington:

The politics of the belly points to the propensity of politicians to hoard and greedily consume resources in things and people. In addition to highlighting the significance of idioms of eating and the belly to African conceptions of power, Bayart's analysis insists on the importance of vertical relationships – those between social unequals such as [...] patrons or clients – to understand African political history.

== Introduction ==
Similar in concept to neopatrimonialism, in which private sector support is bought by the state, the Politics of the Belly is a metaphor for a form of governance that arose across Africa after decolonisation. Characterised by a controlling government and the interdependence of the elite in control of the private and public spheres, actors on both sides use their status to strengthen their economic and political power.

A number of spin-off ideas, such as the "politics of the womb", have been proposed by academics on the back of the Bayart thesis.

== Key points ==
=== Longue durée ===
Bayart seeks to ground the African political experience in its history, rather than treating it as an experience stemming purely from colonialism. He argues that 'politics of the belly' as a political system is an autochthonous and active method of governance, as well as an effective way of governing.

=== Politics of the belly ===
Politics of the belly covers a range of political 'sins' which Bayart argues comprise the most effective and appropriate method of living in African likely to succeed. It refers to the merging of the legal and illegal markets, the proliferation of bribery, taking advantage of one's position to enrich oneself, and the merging of private and public business. Bayart gives the example of the Zairean Air Force, whose members took advantage of their position to run a private airline for passengers and goods. Those with access to planes transported people while those with less access took advantage in more petty ways, such as by stealing and selling kerosene intended for the defence of the state.

=== Reciprocal elite assimilation ===
Bayart calls the modern African state an 'incubator' of a ruling elite. He argues that the elite ruling group of any African state works to exclude outsiders, enabling internal competition without threatening access to resources and enabling everyone in the group to thrive. The reciprocal elite assimilation also involves aspects of kinship and nepotism. Bayart argues that kin, ethnic and family connections have always been an aspect of African politics, and what a westerner might call nepotism or favouritism is merely part of the African political experience.

=== Gatekeeper roles ===
Bayart argues that historically African leaders have benefited by straddling the interface between external sources of revenues and their people, for example the kings of Dahomey trading with Portuguese and British merchants. Contemporarily, aid is the main source of external resource which can best be managed by leaders for their own enrichment as well as for converting into followers, which in turn allow access to more prestigious gatekeeper roles.

=== Use of resources for political control and vice versa ===
Following on from the gatekeeper role, Bayart argues that wealthy patrons use their resources to acquire patrons who can be used to achieve greater power and therefore access to wealth. Historically Africa has been underpopulated and control of people was considered a better mark of status than control of land. Bayart, in his effort to historicise African rule, argues that material resources are used to acquire politically loyal followers. For example, Bayart writes that to achieve a seat in the Ivorian legislature an aspiring MP would have to expend to equivalent value of 40,000 tonnes of cocoa in largesse to followers in exchange for their votes.

== Examples ==
=== Nigeria ===
Nigeria's postcolonial experience is perhaps the most apt example of the politics of the belly. Coup has followed coup and countless regimes have been in power. Ethnic tension is always present and periodically clashes of intensity ranging from localised rioting as witnessed recently in the central city of Jos between the countries Muslim and Christian populations, to violent clashes between government soldiers and the Ogoni in the state's oil rich delta region, to the full-scale civil war against the Biafran separatists. Throughout much of the strife there has been, behind the scenes, a cabal of high-ranking military personnel that demonstrate the networked nepotism characteristic of Bayart's metaphor.

Ibrahim Babangida and Sani Abacha in particular have gained notoriety. The latter in his four years managed to embezzle over $4 billion before allegedly suffering a heart attack during a session with four prostitutes, in what was dubbed by Nigerians at the time "a coup from heaven". Babangida in his eight-year rule institutionalised corruption and amassed a fortune sufficient to make him one of Nigeria's richest men, creating a system in which many petrol stations in the World's sixth greatest oil producing nation were dry and petrol had to be imported. Babangida reserved many government jobs for his ethnic kinsmen, the Hausa–Fulani.

=== Zaire ===
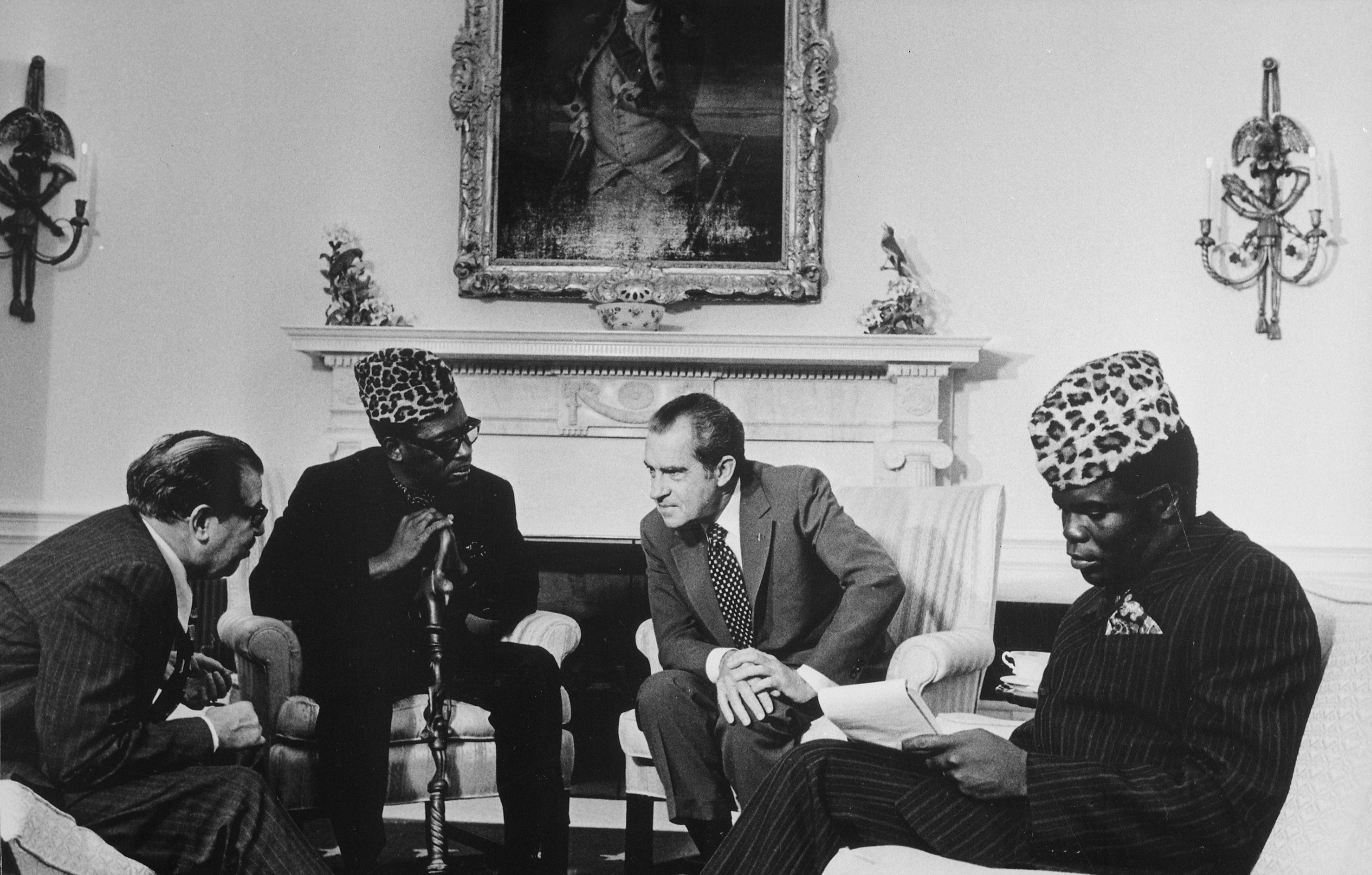
Mobutu Sese Seko pictured with US President Richard Nixon

Zaire under Mobutu Sese Seko follows Bayart's model closely. After a period of instability following the end of Belgian rule in the Congo, Mobutu, an army officer, took power. Thanks to his anti-Communist stance he was able to acquire large amounts of foreign aid which he used to enrich himself, friends, family and tribe. Kleptocracy, patrimonialism and corruption tore the state apart and reduced it to a level of state failure, in which Mobutu's government lost its monopoly on violence and stopped providing any sort of basic state service. Zaire became a 'hollow' state. 17-22% of Zaire's annual budget was spent on Mobutu personally.

Politics of the belly was manifest throughout Zairean society. For example, Mobutu ensured members of his ethnic group and family received prominent civilian and military positions. His "Praetorian guard", the DSP, was the best equipped and trained unit in the Zairean armed forces (FAZ). Units perceived as disloyal were neglected. From Mobutu down, members of the armed forces would sell military equipment for private gain. Soldiers on the front line during the First Congo War would sell their weapons to their erstwhile enemies. Meanwhile, a general took weapons destined for the front line and sold them to the UNITA rebel group, pocketing the money. This action contributed to the Angolan invasion of Zaire some months later.

Politics of the belly also ran through civil society. "Système D" was the blackly humorous name for the informal Zairean economy, as it came from the French for 'help yourself'. The state did not control its borders, facilitating smuggling and preventing the collection of taxes. Bayart writes about the importance of gatekeepers, including border guards, who are in the position to extract wealth from a population, and there were many gatekeepers making a profit in Congo without any accountability to the people.

== Criticisms ==
As a consequence of Bayart's longue durée approach to Africa, critics have accused him of homogenising the African political experience and of rendering static the history of the continent. Young writes that Bayart reduces Africa to 'soggy pluralism' by refusing to engage with the scope of African experience, while Clapham criticises Bayart for largely ignoring specific events which cause radical change, such as wars, failing states or refugee crises. He writes that Bayart uses Africa's past expertly but is weaker when it comes to its present, for example in his neglect of the language of modern African politics, anthropology and demographics (for example Bayart has nothing to say about Africa's extremely young population).

Bayart, a Frenchman, is also criticised for focusing on Francophone countries to draw conclusions about the entirety of the sub-Saharan continent (with the exception of Ethiopia). Furthermore, presumably in an effort to demonstrate African politics, Abbott criticises Bayart's relatively thin treatment of colonialism.

Young criticises Bayart's cavalier attitude towards individual institutions of African governance. Bayart's confidence in his politics of the belly model, Young writes, obviates the need to actually examine any institution, ideology or personality. Regardless of type, he argues they demonstrate politics of the belly.

== See also ==
- Nepotism
- Political corruption
- Gatekeeper state
- Article 15 (Democratic Republic of the Congo)
