= Political Order and Political Decay =

2014 book by Francis Fukuyama

- First edition
- Author: Francis Fukuyama
- Language: English
- Genre: Non-fiction
- Publisher: Farrar, Straus and Giroux
- Publication date: 2014
- Publication place: United States
- Preceded by: The Origins of Political Order

Political Order and Political Decay: From the Industrial Revolution to the Globalisation of Democracy is a 2014 book by American political scientist Francis Fukuyama. The book follows Fukuyama's 2011 book, The Origins of Political Order, written to shed light on political institutions and their development in different regions.

Twenty years after his pivotal 1989 essay “The End of History?”, Fukuyama remains committed to the liberal democratic state as an ideal form of government, compared to alternatives such as the Chinese, Russian or Islamist governments. However, he warns against internal forces leading to stagnation and political decay within liberal democracies, which threatens the future of this form of government.

== Three components of political order ==
=== The three components ===
Fukuyama stresses the importance of the three pillars of the modern state, as described in the first volume in the series, The Origins of Political Order:

1. The state (executive capability to exercise power).
2. Rule of Law (vs. Rule by Law)
3. Democratic Accountability.

In other words, in an ideal system, a powerful and efficient state is kept in check by the people, and by the law, which can bind the state itself. Importantly, Fukuyama distinguishes between an effective state and a large state. The former is simply about competence, and it can be present in states with little welfare (Singapore) or extensive welfare (Netherlands).

Different regions and countries developed these three institutions, if at all, at different times. China, for example, developed a strong state early on, but never fully developed the rule of law or political accountability. India developed institutions akin to the rule of law early in its history, but not strong states. An ideal modern state, as conceived by Fukuyama, must have all three institutions in a delicate balance. Only in certain parts of Europe, in the late 18th century, did all three institutions come together to what we now recognize as a modern liberal democratic state.

=== Development of the three components ===
The Origins of Political Order, the first book of the series, described the three important institutions and their development. Political Order and Political Decay begins where the first book left off, focusing on developments in various countries from the French Revolution to the present. The book traces the development of these institutions in China, Japan, Prussia, Latin America and the United States, before warning against the decay of institutions.

==== The United States ====
Fukuyama describes the early U.S. having a weak state, with goods and offices handed out based on corruption and patrimony, partially because democracy entrenched itself without a strong state with capacity to rule effectively. Before the Pendleton Act of 1883, for example, all political offices were allocated on the basis of patronage.

From the end of the 19th century to the mid-20th century, however, the Progressive Movement and the New Deal transformed the American state and made it much stronger and more effective. Scholars, administrators and politicians advocated for, and eventually built, agencies administered by experts selected on the basis of merit and education instead of political hacks. A workable bureaucracy, tax system and federal infrastructure were products of this transformation.

This governmental change reflects “a social revolution brought about by industrialization, which mobilized a host of new political actors with no interest in the old clientelist system.” The American example shows that democracies can build strong states, but Fukuyama argues that the process requires much effort, over time, by powerful players not tied to the older patrimonial political system.

==== Other case studies ====
The problem once faced by America is now seen in certain parts of Africa, where democracy weakens government capacity and authority by subjecting it to too many conflicts. By contrast, East Asian countries like Japan and South Korea, with a tradition of strong central government, meant that an authoritative state could survive democratic empowerment. Fukuyama also argues that war is sometimes an important shock to established systems, leading to institutional transformations. He contends that the two World Wars, while horrific, empowered the state and made it fit for more democracy after the war. Dysfunctional politics in Latin America, Fukuyama claims, is partially due to fewer wars and consequent weaker states.

Ideas in the book are exemplified throughout the first and the second volumes via different cases:

- Denmark - used as an example for an ideal state, with a competent state, the rule of law, and accountability through democratic elections.
- Nigeria - used as an example for a highly corrupted state that has been a case study of natural resources exploitation by its leaders.
- Greece and Italy - used as examples of highly corrupted states with pervasive patronage and clientelism local systems.
- China - an example of a strong state that has been able to organize in this form once and again, thousands years ago and nowadays. Although somewhat lacking in the rule of law and accountability, Fukuyama argues that China's sequence of acquiring the institutions is developmentally right, because the strong state came before democratization.

Fukuyama is skeptical of transplanting institutions, stating that “We should . . . be wary of foreigners bearing gifts of institutions”. While Western institutions and models of development have been successful within their own societies, “each society must adapt them to its own conditions and build on indigenous traditions.”

=== Clientelism and Patronage ===
Fukuyama makes the argument that patronage behavior is rooted in the following biological roots:

1. Reciprocal Altruism.
2. Kinship Selection.

Fukuyama argues that humans, by biological disposition, are likely to favor friends and family over others, leading to patrimonialism. Successful political order requires institutions that can check and channel these impulses, thereby allowing productivity and the public good. Fukuyama argues that in the modern world, the institutions best accomplish this feat is a strong state coupled with the rule of law and democratic accountability.

== Political decay in the United States ==
In his 1968 book Political Order in Changing Societies, Samuel P. Huntington used the term "political decay" to describe the instability experienced by many newly independent countries after World War II. Political institutions are rules that ensure stability and predictability in human societies, and they also facilitate collection action. However, Huntington explains, sometimes old political institutions do not adapt to new circumstances because of self-interest of insiders, cognitive inertia, or conformism. Chaotic and sometimes violent transitions may then take place. Fukuyama argues that while democracies can theoretically reform through electoral politics, they are also potentially subject to decay when institutions do not adapt.

After tracing how a modern and effective government was developed in the U.S., Fukuyama asserts that it is experiencing political decay. When institutional structures developed from a previous time fail to evolve with societal changes, institutional decline results. It is possible for an effective democratic state to decline, and the dynamics of the U.S. decline are explored in the final section of the book.

=== State capture, vetocracy and judicialization ===
Fukuyama perceives this decay as manifesting in a declining quality of bureaucracy, resulting in a weaker and less efficient state. Fukuyama described American politics as a system of “courts and parties,” where legal and legislative mechanisms are valued more than a competent administrative government.

This favoritism towards excessive checks and balances lead to a "vetocracy," where a small interest group can veto a measure beneficial to the public good. Dysfunctional political divides results in small networks capturing political outcomes, through a process of “repatrimonialization.” Special interest groups capture Congress, excessively influence the legislative process, distort taxes and spending, introduce self-conflicting mandates to bureaucracies, and use the judicial process to challenge and delay actions in costly proceedings.

Unlike France, Germany or Japan, Fukuyama argued, state capacity in America came after the rule of law and democratic politics, and it has always been weaker and viewed with distrust. As a result, many administrative agencies do not have the rule-making power and authority enjoyed by more competent bureaucracies. Instead, Congress allows private parties to liberally sue in court, resulting in unthinkable transformations of the law and drastic growths in legal proceedings. The judicialization of processes then results in "uncertainty, procedural complexity, redundancy, lack of finality, [and] high transaction costs."

=== Consequences ===
The result of the process, Fukuyama argues, is a vicious cycle. When the American state performs poorly, it reinforces distrust and lessens investments in the state, which then leads to even poorer performances. Yet, in the United States, a veneration of the Constitution and the founding fathers have impeded necessary government reforms.

Fukuyama fears that America’s problems may increasingly come to characterize other liberal democracies, such as European countries, where “the growth of the European Union and the shift of policy making away from national capitals to Brussels” has made “the European system as a whole . . . resemble that of the United States to an increasing degree.”

== See also ==
- Political history of the world
