= Prebendalism =

Political system whose officials use public funds to assist their in-group

Prebendalism refers to political systems in which elected officials and government workers feel they have a right to a share of government revenues, and they use them to benefit supporters, co-religionists and members of their ethnic group.

== Origins of the term ==
The Catholic Encyclopedia defines a prebend as the "right of member of chapter to his share in the revenues of a cathedral".

Max Weber used the term to describe India and China in the early Middle Ages in his 1915 book, The Religion of China and his 1916 book, The Religion of India.

The occidental seigneurie, like the oriental Indian, developed through the disintegration of the central authority of the patrimonial state power—the disintegration of the Carolingian Empire in the Occident, the disintegration of the Caliphs and the Maharadja or Great Moguls in India. In the Carolingian Empire, however, the new stratum developed on the basis of a rural subsistence economy. Through oath-bound vassalage, patterned after the war following, the stratum of lords was joined to the king and interposed itself between the freemen and the king. Feudal relations were also to be found in India, but they were not decisive for the formation either of a nobility or landlordism. In India, as in the Orient generally, a characteristic seigniory developed rather out of tax farming and the military and tax prebends of a far more bureaucratic state. The oriental seigniory therefore remained in essence, a "prebend" and did not become a "fief"; not feudalization, but prebendalization of the patrimonial state occurred. The comparable, though undeveloped, occidental parallel is not the medieval fief but the purchase of offices and prebends during the papal seicento or during the days of the French Noblesse de Robe.

Alavi describes how state-derived rights over capital held by state officials in parts of India in the early 18th Century were held to be of a patron-client nature and thus volatile. They were thus converted where possible into hereditary entitlements.

== In Nigeria ==
Richard A. Joseph, director of The Program of African Studies at Northwestern University, is usually credited with first using the term to describe patron-clientelism or neopatrimonialism in Nigeria. Since then the term has commonly been used in scholarly literature and textbooks.

Joseph wrote in 1996, "According to the theory of prebendalism, state offices are regarded as prebends that can be appropriated by officeholders, who use them to generate material benefits for themselves and their constituents and kin groups".

As a result of that kind of patron–client or identity politics, Nigeria has regularly been one of the lowest ranked nations for political transparency by Transparency International in its Corruption Perceptions Index.

Other uses include the corruption investigations into the activities of 31 out of 36 Nigerian governors, the frequent comments in the Nigerian press about the problems of corruption (for example, Victor E. Dike's article in the Daily Champion of Lagos, "Nigeria: Governance and Nigeria's Ailing Economy") and the common defenses of prebendalism as necessary for justice and equality in government funding (for example Oliver O. Mbamara's editorial, "In Defense of Nigeria: Amidst the Feasting of Critics" at Africa Events).

== See also ==
- Clientelism
- Neopatrimonialism
- Patronage in ancient Rome
