= System D =

French calque denoting resourcefulness when solving problems

System D is a manner of responding to challenges that require one to have the ability to think quickly, to adapt, and to improvise when getting a job done. The term is a direct translation of French Système D; the letter D refers to any one of the French nouns débrouille, débrouillardise or démerde (French slang). The verbs se débrouiller and se démerder mean to make do, to manage, especially in an adverse situation. Basically, it refers to one's ability and need to be resourceful.

In Down and Out in Paris and London, George Orwell described the term débrouillard as something the lowest-level kitchen workers, the plongeur, aspired to be known as, indicating that they were people who would get the job done, no matter what.

The term System D gained wider popularity in the United States after appearing in the 2006 publication of Anthony Bourdain's The Nasty Bits. Bourdain references finding the term in Nicolas Freeling's memoir, The Kitchen, about Freeling's years as a Grand Hotel cook in France.

In recent literature on the informal economy, System D is the growing share of the world's economy which makes up the underground economy, which as of 2011 has a projected GDP of $10 trillion. The informal economy is usually considered as one part of a dual economy.

The concept of dual economy is where the economy is divided into two parts: the formal and the informal. The formal economy consists of all economic activities that operate within the official legal framework and are regulated by the government. In common parlance, it is understood as enterprises and citizens who pay taxes on all generated incomes. The reason the informal economy is described as a DIY economy or System D is because of the self-reliance of the members within this sector. This is not to be confused with autarky or self-reliant economies. Rather, due to lack of documentation, such as proof of citizenship, tax ID number, proof of identity or proof of address, people working in this sector are usually left with no way to seek support from their governments. This means that they are unable to access formal institutions which require documentation and forces them to be self-reliant.

Economists define self-sufficiency or self-reliance at the individual or household level as the ability to accumulate and hold resources beyond those required to meet basic needs. In the context of an informal, or a System D economy, this would not only include a person's financial resources but their ability to mobilize skills, talents, social relationships and networks as buffers against economic shock.

== In other languages ==
There are a range of terms in other languages describing similar circumstances. Examples for those are Trick 17 in German, Trick 77 in Swiss German, kikka kolmonen (Trick 3) in Finnish, 'n boer maak 'n plan in Afrikaans, to hack it in English, desenrascanço in European Portuguese, se virar in Brazilian Portuguese, Jugaad in Urdu, Hindi, and Punjabi, jua kali in Swahili, diskarte in Tagalog and article 15 in Congolese French.

== See also ==
- Agorism
- Bricolage
- WIEGO
- systemd
