= Jean-François Bayart =

French political scientist

Jean-François Bayart (born 20 March 1950 in Boulogne-Billancourt) is a French political scientist and former director of research at the French National Centre for Scientific Research (CNRS). His specialty is the comparative historical sociology of the state.

He is notably the author of several books on sub-Saharan Africa and the historicity of politics. Since 2015, he has been a professor at the Graduate Institute of International and Development Studies (IHEID) in Geneva.

Bayart founded the journal Politique africaine (in 1980–81), Critique internationale (in 1998), and the book collection “Recherches internationales” (in 1998, published by Éditions Karthala). He served as director of the Centre d'études et de recherches internationales (CERI) at the Paris Institute of Political Studies (Sciences Po) from 1994 to 2000 and is the founding president of the Fund for the Analysis of Political Societies (FASOPO), established in 2003.

He is a commentator on international politics in various media outlets, notably Mediapart. He was a permanent consultant for the Policy Planning Staff of the French Ministry of Foreign Affairs from 1990 to 2005 and a member of the commission for the 2013 French White Paper on Defence and National Security (2012–2013). He has served as the scientific director of the Focus section of the Rencontres des cinémas d'Europe at the Maison de l'image d'Aubenas since 2010. He has taught at the Paris Institute of Political Studies, the University of Paris 1 Pantheon-Sorbonne, the University of Lausanne, and the University of Turin.

== Biography ==
Jean-François Bayart graduated from the Paris Institute of Political Studies in 1970. He obtained a doctorate in political science in 1977 under the supervision of Pierre Alexandre and Serge Hurtig.

With his first academic publication, L'État au Cameroun (The State in Cameroon, 1979), Jean-François Bayart distanced himself from the schools of thought then dominating political science: modernization and political development theories (of North American origin) on one hand, and the dependency school (of Latin American origin) on the other. Instead, he argued that the systems of inequality and domination inherent in pre-colonial African societies possess their own historical dynamics. Consequently, Bayart argued, postcolonial national constructions cannot be understood solely through their relations with Western powers or their position in the world economy. African states must therefore be analyzed within their own historicity. This requires analyzing power relations within contemporary African societies—particularly the role played by the dominant class—to reveal all parameters influencing the present and future of these states, he posited. From this perspective, Jean-François Bayart developed original concepts widely used in the social sciences, such as:

- Politics of the belly (la politique du ventre);
- Rhizome state;
- Extraversion strategy;
- Reciprocal assimilation of elites.

A similar misunderstanding arose during the publication of his book The Criminalization of the State in Africa (1997, co-authored with Stephen Ellis and Béatrice Hibou). This work addressed a problem of historical sociology, and its analysis was limited to a handful of countries, yet it was sometimes misinterpreted more broadly.

This occurred despite Bayart having criticized culturalism the previous year in L'Illusion identitaire (The Illusion of Identity, 1996). In this work, he opposed Samuel P. Huntington's thesis on the “clash of civilizations” and developed a theory allowing readers to conceptualize the consubstantial relations between culture and politics “without being culturalist,” much as he had sought ten years earlier to analyze Africa's dependence “without being dependentist”. Beyond contemporary debates and polemics, this book followed the same vein as The State in Africa: The Politics of the Belly, refining the concepts of political enunciation and extraversion proposed in the 1980s. It also insisted on the central role of the imaginary in producing the political and its relation to material culture practices.

Jean-François Bayart's works in the 1980s emphasized the need to apprehend politics "from the bottom" by focusing on "popular modes of political action". This approach involves understanding political life not just through the actions of states or elites (a 'top-down' perspective), but by examining how ordinary people, communities, and social groups experience, navigate, and influence power structures ('from the bottom'). "Popular modes of political action" refers to the diverse, often informal or unconventional, methods people use to engage politically, encompassing everyday practices, social networks, cultural expressions, and economic activities, beyond formal participation like voting.

These notions, introduced in L'État au Cameroun (1979), were reiterated in articles for Politique africaine and the Revue française de science politique. Some were collected in Le Politique par le bas en Afrique noire (Politics from Below in Black Africa), published in collaboration with Achille Mbembe and Comi Toulabor in 1992 and reissued in an expanded version in 2008. This focus on "politics from the bottom" aligned with the zeitgeist, joining similar contemporary work such as Alltagsgeschichte (history of everyday life) in Germany, Indian subaltern studies, and the work of French historian Michel de Certeau, who occasionally participated in Jean-François Bayart's seminar at CERI.

After dedicating most of his time to directing CERI from 1994 to 2000 and refusing the scientific direction of the National Foundation of Political Sciences (offered by its administrator, Richard Descoings), Jean-François Bayart authored two major works building on his previous research.

- In Le gouvernement du monde. Une critique politique de la globalisation (Global Subjects: A Political Critique of Globalization, 2004), he returned to the historicity of the state, demonstrating that its universalization has been a key dimension of globalization for two centuries, contrary to claims within international relations theory. He introduced the concept of "national-liberalism," later revisited polemically in a collection of militant articles, Sortir du national-libéralisme. Croquis politiques des années 2004–2012 (Exiting National-Liberalism: Political Sketches of the Years 2004–2012, 2012). Here, he specified that national-liberalism relates to liberalism similarly to how national socialism relates to socialism. Additionally, in Global Subjects, he analyzed the processes of subjectivation that produce globalization—at the intersection of material culture and body techniques—arguing against viewing globalization solely as an experience of alienation.
- In L'Islam républicain. Ankara, Téhéran, Dakar (Republican Islam: Ankara, Tehran, Dakar, 2010), Bayart again demonstrated, through three case studies, the inadequacy of culturalist explanations for politics. He replaced these with a sociological interpretation focused on state formation, re-emphasizing its historicity, the connections between national or imperial trajectories, the intertwining durations constituting the political, and the importance of subjectivation practices. Beyond its specific scope, this book implicitly served as a manifesto for comparative historical sociology of politics, similar to the short essay Les Études postcoloniales, un carnaval académique (Postcolonial Studies: An Academic Carnival, 2010). Notably, Bayart countered the political science trend known as "transitology" by refining the concept of the "Thermidorian situation"—advanced in 1991 regarding the Islamic Republic of Iran—and substituting it for the notion of "transition" to democracy and market economy in analyzing post-revolutionary regimes.

Jean-François Bayart centers his approach on actors' actual practices rather than solely on ideologies or cultural representations. He explores historical paradoxes by emphasizing the inseparability of coercion and hegemony and highlighting actors' lived experiences. His method distinctively ranges from empirical observation to problematization and theorization. Major themes recurring in his books—besides historicity—include the incompleteness of political societies and the constitutive ambivalence of social relations.

Jean-François Bayart has long criticized French foreign policy, arguing it inadequately served third countries, particularly former French colonies in Africa. He advocates for a complete opening of borders and denounces European efforts to curb African immigration, even calling for punishing European leaders guilty, in his view, of cooperation agreements with Libya on this issue. He also opposes the application of New Public Management principles to higher education and research.

He founded two journals (the first at age thirty), a book collection, and the Fund for the Analysis of Political Societies (FASOPO). As director of CERI (1994–2000), his work enhanced its international influence. He initiated efforts to de-bureaucratize CERI's functioning. In 2010, he created the Focus section of the Rencontres des cinémas d'Europe at the Maison de l'Image in Aubenas.

According to Morgane Govoreanu, a peculiarity of Bayart's professional career is his consistent distinction between the roles imposed upon him, always highlighting their specific logics: researcher, teacher, administrator, expert consultant, and militant commentator.

== Career ==
- 1994 to 2000: Director of CERI
- 1980 to 1982: Founder and director of the journal Politique africaine
- 1998 to 2003: Founder and director of the journal Critique internationale
- Since 1981: Member of the scientific council of Politique africaine
- Since 1998: Director of the "Recherches internationales" collection at Éditions Karthala
- 1990 to 2005: Permanent consultant at the Policy Planning Staff (Centre d'analyse et de prévision) of the Ministry of Foreign Affairs of France
- 2002 to 2006: Governor of the European Cultural Foundation (Amsterdam)

== Publications ==
- L'État au Cameroun, Paris, Presses de la Fondation nationale des sciences politiques, 1979 (2e édition augmentée: 1985); notes de lecture par Jean-François Médard, Christian Coulon, Yves-André Fauré, Jean-Claude Barbier, Jean Copans, in Politique africaine, no 1, mars 1981, p. 120-139
- La Politique africaine de François Mitterrand, Paris, Karthala, 1984
- L'État en Afrique. La politique du ventre, Paris, Fayard, 1989 (2e édition augmentée, Fayard, 2006)
- Les Temps modernes, « La France au Rwanda », CERI, Paris, 1995
- L'Illusion identitaire, Paris, Fayard, 1996 (prix Jean-Jacques Rousseau, 1997), 2018
- Le Gouvernement du monde. Une Critique politique de la globalisation, Paris, Fayard, 2004
- Les Études postcoloniales. Un carnaval académique, Paris, Karthala, 2010
- L’Islam républicain. Ankara, Téhéran, Dakar, Paris, Albin Michel, 2010
- Africa en el Espejo. Colonizacion, criminalidad y estado, Mexico, Fondo de Cultura Economica, 2011
- Sortir du national-libéralisme. Croquis politiques des années 2004–2012, Paris, Karthala, 2012
- Le Plan cul. Ethnologie d'une pratique sexuelle, Paris, Fayard, 2014
- Les Fondamentalistes de l'identité. Laïcisme versus djihadisme. Paris, Karthala, 2016
- L'Impasse nationale-libérale, Paris, La découverte, coll. « Cahiers libres », 2017, 229 p. (ISBN 978-2-7071-9410-7)
