= Article 15 (idiom) =

Phrase describing corruption and informality in the Democratic Republic of the Congo

"Whether you're young or old, we all face the same reality: the difficult life
The daily nightmare.
What to do? If nothing else, refer to Article 15:
"Do what you must to live"
In Kinshasa."

— "Article 15 Beta Libanga", 1985 song, by Pépé Kallé. Translation by Gary Stewart.

Article 15 (article quinze, French pronunciation: [aʁ.ti.klə.kɛ̃z]) is a humorous French-language idiom in the Democratic Republic of the Congo encouraging reference to an imaginary legal provision permitting individuals to take any measures, whether legal or illegal, necessitated by adverse personal circumstances such as economic hardship, crime, or state oppression.

Originating during the Congo Crisis and popularised under the Zairean regime in the 1970s, Article 15 references a fictional provision of the 14-article constitution of the secessionist state of South Kasai (1960-63) which was said to read simply "débrouillez-vous!". This common French expression has been variously translated as "get on with it", "fend for yourself", "figure it out yourself", "make do to survive", "deal with it yourself", or "do what you need to do".

A popular idiom in the Democratic Republic of the Congo, Article 15 refers to an individual's inability to expect help from the state and thus justifies actions taken at their own initiative to muddle through. It is sometimes used to justify or explain unlawful conduct especially corruption and petty crime in the country.

Article 15 plays a prominent role in Congolese popular culture, such as the Congolese rumba song "Article 15, oyebi yango" (1963) or "Article 15 Beta Libanga" (1985).

== See also ==
- System D, an equivalent concept in English from European French
- Politics of the belly
