= Patrimonialism =

Form of governance

Patrimonialism is a form of governance in which the ruler governs on the basis of personal loyalties which are derived from patron-client relations, personal allegiances, kin ties, and combinations thereof. Patrimonialism is closely related to corruption, opportunism, and machine politics. It can contribute to underdevelopment and weak state capacity.

In contrast to many other systems of governance, the ruler does not derive legitimacy from personal charisma or a sense of mission, but primarily through the ability to dole out rewards and punishments. Initially coined by Max Weber, patrimonialism stands in contrast to rational-legal bureaucracies, as there is no objective of efficiency in public administration and government staff are not advanced based on merit, experience, and training.

While patrimonialism is common in authoritarian regimes, it is not a necessary component of them. Democratic governments can also be characterized by patrimonial rule, in particular in fragile and underdeveloped states. Some scholars have noted an increased prevalence of patrimonialism across the world since the turn of the 21st century and especially since the 2010s, both in authoritarian and democratic states. A related term, neopatrimonialism, has been used to describe governance systems in various African countries.

== Descriptions by scholars ==
=== Max Weber ===
Julia Adams states: "In Weber's Economy and Society, patrimonialism mainly refers to forms of government that are based on rulers' family-households. The ruler's authority is personal-familial, and the mechanics of the household are the model for political administration. The concept of patrimonialism captures a distinctive style of regulation and administration that contrasts with Weber's ideal-typical rational-legal bureaucracy". She states that Weber has used patrimonialism to describe, among other systems, "estatist and absolutist politics of early modern Europe". For Weber, patriarchy is at the centre of patrimonalism and is its model and origin.

=== Schmuel Eisenstadt ===
Schmuel Eisenstadt coined the term neopatrimonialism to distinguish historical patrimonial regimes from the "post-traditional" societies of Latin America, South Asia, and the Middle East.

=== Richard Pipes ===
Richard Pipes, a historian and Professor Emeritus of Russian history at Harvard University, defined patrimonial as "a regime where the rights of sovereignty and those of ownership blend to the point of being indistinguishable, and political power is exercised in the same manner as economic power."

=== J. I. Bakker ===
J. I. Bakker, a sociologist at the University of Guelph, states:

The key focus in the model [patrimonialism] is the extent to which legitimate authority is based primarily on personal power exercised by the ruler, either directly or indirectly. The ruler may act alone or as a member of a powerful elite group or oligarchy. The ruler is not viewed as a tyrant. The structure of the Roman Catholic Church today is still patrimonial. Direct rule involves the ruler and a few key members of the ruler's household or staff maintaining personal control over every aspect of governance. If rule is indirect, there may be an intellectual or moral elite of priests or office holders as well as a military. The priestly group may invoke deity for the leader. The king, sultan, maharaja, or other ruler can make independent decisions on an ad hoc basis, with little if any checks and balances. No individual or group is powerful enough to oppose the ruler consistently without, in turn, becoming the new patrimonial ruler. The ruler is recognized as the chief landholder and, in the extreme case, all of the land and its people are his domain. The legal authority of the ruler is largely unchallenged; there is no recognized body of case law or formal law, but there may be notions of etiquette and honor.

=== Francis Fukuyama ===
In his The Origins of Political Order, Francis Fukuyama states on the matter:

Natural human sociability is built around two principles, kin selection and reciprocal altruism. The principle of kin selection or inclusive fitness states that human beings will act altruistically toward genetic relatives (or individuals believed to be genetic relatives) in rough proportion to their shared genes. The principle of reciprocal altruism says that human beings will tend to develop relationships of mutual benefit or mutual harm as they interact with other individuals over time. Reciprocal altruism, unlike kin selection, does not depend on genetic relatedness; it does, however, depend on repeated, direct personal interaction and the trust relationships generated out of such interactions. These forms of social cooperation are the default ways human beings interact in the absence of incentives to adhere to other, more impersonal institutions. When impersonal institutions decay, these are the forms of cooperation that always reemerge because they are natural to human beings. What I have labeled patrimonialism is political recruitment based on either of these two principles. Thus, when bureaucratic offices were filled with the kinsmen of rulers at the end of the Han dynasty in China, when the Janissaries wanted their sons to enter the corps, or when offices were sold as heritable property in ancien régime France, a natural patrimonial principle was simply reasserting itself.

== Examples ==
Patrimonialism was prevalent in medieval Europe. Richard Pipes cited the Egyptian Ptolemies and the Attalids of Pergamon as early patrimonial monarchies, both successor states to Alexander the Great's empire. Pipes argued that the Russia between the 12th and 17th century, and with certain modifications until 1917, was a patrimonial system. Jean Bodin described seigneurial monarchies in the Six Books of the Commonwealth (1576–1586), where the monarch owns all the land. He claimed that Turkey and Muscovy were the only European examples. Indonesia, before and during the Suharto administration, is often cited as being patrimonial in its political-economy. Randall Collins argued, based on Max Weber's definition, that organized crime groups like gangs and mafia are patrimonial political organizations, as contrasted with the bureaucratic nature of modern states.

=== On Trumpism ===
Political sociology professor Dylan John Riley characterized Trumpism as "neo-Bonapartist patrimonialism" in 2019. Jonathan Rauch claimed that Donald Trump (particularly during his second administration), along with Narendra Modi, Viktor Orbán, and Vladimir Putin, were patrimonial due in part to what Rauch describes as Putin's use of "propaganda, subversion", and other methods to "make the world safe" for his model by spreading it abroad.

== Weakness ==
Jonathan Rauch notes that the opposite of patrimonialism is not democracy but "bureaucratic proceduralism". The weakness of patrimonialism is that as it undermines bureaucracy it "weakens and eventually cripples" the state. Skilled, or just competent people are replaced by obedient ones dependent on the ruler's support; corruption is accelerated as contractors, grant-givers, civil servants become accustomed to currying favor. Bureaucracy is necessary for an advanced, complicated society to operate well, but it seeks expertise, functions according to laws and rules, interfering with the whims of the father-ruler to dispense favors and punishments. Eventually, at some point, the public's instinctual antagonism to corruption (the giving of service to others and not to the public) and incompetence will be triggered and bring the regime down.

== See also ==
- Clientelism
- Crony capitalism
- Neopatrimonialism
- Pater familias
- Political particularism
- Pork barrel
- Spoils system
- Tsarist autocracy
- Votebank
- Vote buying
