= Éditions Karthala =

French publishing company

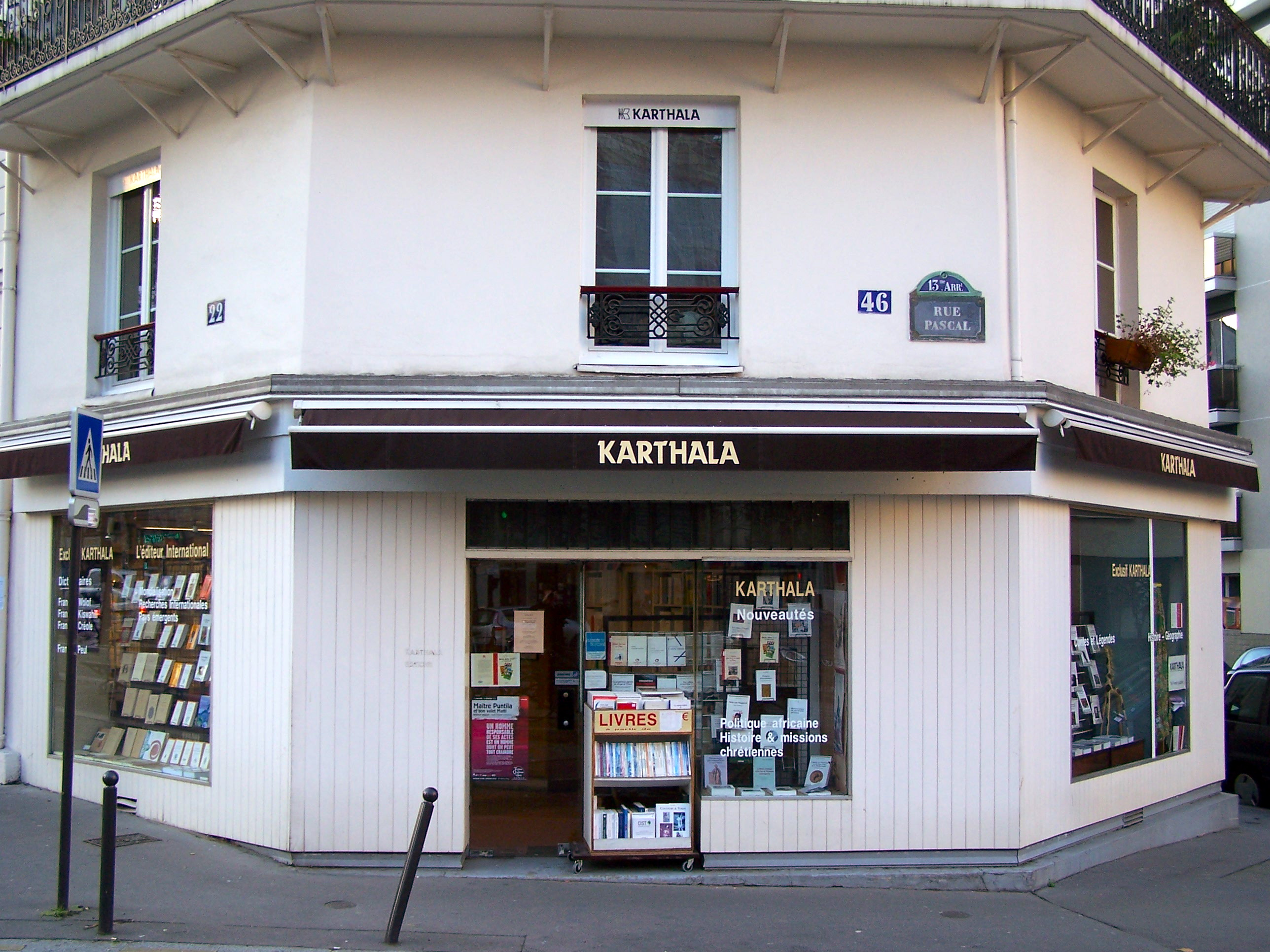
- Éditions Karthala, 22–24, boulevard Arago / Rue Pascal, Paris, 2012.
- Industry: Publishing
- Genre: History, sociology, religion, languages and geopolitics of developing countries
- Founded: 1980; 46 years ago
- Founder: Robert Ageneau
- Headquarters: 22–24 boulevard Arago, 13th arrondissement, Paris, France
- Website: www.karthala.com

Karthala is a French publishing house specializing in the history, sociology, religion, languages and geopolitics of developing countries.

Its headquarters is at 22–24 boulevard Arago in the 13th arrondissement of Paris, France.

Karthala was founded in 1980 by Robert Ageneau, who was previously editor of the journal Spiritus (1969–1974), member of the Congregation of the Holy Spirit and co-director of another publishing house, Harmattan.

Karthala was founded with the aim of publishing texts on international issues related to developing countries. Twenty years after the independence movements of the 1950s and 1960s, there was felt to be a need for new approaches to what was then known as the "Third World", and in particular Africa.

In 2011, the Karthala catalogue contained some 2200 titles. The list mainly comprises books on human, political and social sciences. Early publications focused on Africa, the Maghreb, the Arab world, Islam, Latin America, and the countries of the Indian Ocean and the Caribbean. The quarterly journal Politique africaine was also launched at this time. Literary studies, travel books, and collections of folktales have also been present from the start, as well as a series of dictionaries and other linguistic studies.

During the 1990s, Karthala expanded and diversified its catalogue to included Asia, Central Europe and Eastern Europe. Topical series have been created (including series on World Medicine, Childhood, International Research, and contemporary Christianity). Karthala currently publishes around 120 new titles a year.

In 2014, Xavier Audrain became director of Karthala.

The publishing house takes its name from Mount Karthala, an active volcano in the Comoros.

== See also ==
- L'Harmattan
- James Currey
