= Big man (political science) =

Corrupt, autocratic leader

The terms big man, big man syndrome, and bigmanism, within the context of political science, refer to a single person's rule over a country, often in a corrupt, autocratic and to some extent totalitarian manner.

Generally associated with neopatrimonial states, where there is a framework of formal law and administration but the state is informally captured by patronage networks. The distribution of the spoils of office takes precedence over the formal functions of the state, severely limiting the ability of public officials to make policies in the general interest. While neopatrimonialism may be considered the norm where a modern state is constructed in a preindustrial context, however, the African variants often result in bigmanism in the form of a strongly presidentialist political system.

According to The Economist, "Big men are unequivocally bad for political rights. They harass their opponents, imprison them, drive them into exile or have them killed. Free speech is tightly curtailed. Corruption is rampant... [they] tend to produce poor economic outcomes... [they] suffer from more conflict, less private investment and a worse provision of public goods."

== Examples ==
=== Africa ===
Bigmanism is particularly prevalent in African politics. As of 2025, seven of the ten longest-serving non-royal leaders were in Africa.

The following African leaders have been described as examples of bigmanism:

- Mobutu Sese Seko – President of the Democratic Republic of the Congo (1965–1971), renamed to Zaire (1971–1997). While in office, he formed a regime in Zaire that attempted to purge the country of all colonial cultural influence and entered wars to challenge the rise of communism in other African countries. His mismanagement of his country's economy, and personal enrichment from its financial and natural resources, makes his name synonymous with kleptocracy in Africa.
- Omar Bongo – President of Gabon (1967–2009). Although Gabon remained politically stable during his tenure, his government was accused of corruption and nepotism.
- Daniel arap Moi – President of Kenya (1978–2002). During his presidency, Moi governed through a mixture of authoritarianism and patronage politics, while also positioning his country as a key ally of the United States during the Cold War. Several schools and an airport were named after him by the time he left office.
- José Eduardo dos Santos – President of Angola (1979–2017). Dos Santos's presidency became increasingly controversial following the end of the Angolan Civil War in the early 2000s, with his administration being accused of corruption, nepotism and, according to Angolan journalist Rafael Marques de Morais, of cultivating a cult of personality.
- Teodoro Obiang Nguema Mbasogo – President of Equatorial Guinea (1982–present).
- Paul Biya – President of Cameroon (1982–present).
- Yoweri Museveni – President of Uganda (1986–present).

=== Americas ===
- François Duvalier – President of Haiti from 1957 to 1971. In 1964 he made himself president for life. He ruled until his death in 1971, in a regime marked by autocracy, corruption and state-sponsored terrorism through his private militia known as Tonton Macoutes. It has been estimated that he was responsible for 30,000 dead and the exile of thousands more.
- Daniel Ortega – Leader of Nicaragua (1979–1990) and again (2007–present). Having led the country after the Sandinista revolution, he returned to the presidency in 2007 and has since been described as consolidating control over state institutions and the economy, suppressing opposition parties and civil society, and enriching his family and associates.

=== Asia ===
- Suharto – President of Indonesia from 1967 to 1998. The legacy of Suharto's 32-year rule is debated both in Indonesia and abroad. Under his "New Order" administration, Suharto constructed a strong, centralized and military-dominated government. An ability to maintain stability over a sprawling and diverse Indonesia and an avowedly anti-Communist stance won him the economic and diplomatic support of the West during the Cold War. For most of his presidency, Indonesia experienced significant economic growth and industrialization. Against the backdrop of Cold War international relations, Suharto's "New Order" invasion of East Timor, and the subsequent 24-year occupation, resulted in an estimated minimum of 102,800 deaths. A detailed statistical report prepared for the Commission for Reception, Truth and Reconciliation in East Timor. By the 1990s, the New Order's authoritarianism and widespread corruption—estimates of government funds misappropriated by the Suharto family range from US$1.5 billion and US$35 billion was a source of much discontent, and was referred as one of the world's most corrupt leaders. Suharto tops corruption rankings. In the years since his presidency, attempts to try him on charges of corruption and genocide failed because of his poor health.
- Saddam Hussein – President of Iraq from 1979 to 2003. As president, Saddam maintained power during the Iran–Iraq War (1980–1988) and the Gulf War (1991). During these conflicts, Saddam repressed several movements, particularly Shi'a and Kurdish movements seeking to overthrow the government or gain independence, respectively. Whereas some Arabs looked upon him as a hero for his aggressive stance against foreign intervention and for his support for the Palestinians, many Arabs and western leaders vilified him for murdering scores of Kurdish people of the north and his invasion of Kuwait. Saddam was deposed by the U.S. and its allies during the 2003 invasion of Iraq.
- Saparmurat Niyazov – President of Turkmenistan from 1990 until his death in 2006. Foreign media had criticized him as one of the world's most totalitarian and repressive dictators, highlighting his reputation of imposing his personal eccentricities upon the country, which extended to renaming months after members of his family.

=== Europe ===
- Nicolae Ceauşescu – General Secretary of the Romanian Communist Party from 1965 to 1989, President of the Council of State from 1967 and President of Romania from 1974 to 1989. His rule was marked in the first decade by an open policy towards Western Europe and the United States, which deviated from that of the other Warsaw Pact states during the Cold War. He continued a trend first established by his predecessor, Gheorghe Gheorghiu-Dej, who had tactfully coaxed the Khrushchev regime to withdraw troops from Romania in 1958. Ceauşescu's second decade was characterized by an increasingly erratic personality cult, extreme nationalism and a deterioration in foreign relations with Western powers and also with the Soviet Union. Ceauşescu's government was overthrown in December 1989, and he and his wife executed following a televised two-hour session by a military court.

=== Oceania ===
- Michael Somare – Four-time Prime Minister of Papua New Guinea (1975–1980; 1982–1985; 2002–2010; 2011). Both Somare's rule and the predominant politics of Papua New Guinea have been described as examples of bigmanism.

== See also ==
- Big man (anthropology)
- Cult of personality
- Dictatorship
- Strongman (politics)
