= Clientelism =

Exchange of goods and services for political support

Clientelism index

Clientelism or client politics is the exchange of goods and services for political support, often involving an implicit or explicit quid-pro-quo. It is closely related to patronage politics and vote buying.

Clientelism involves an asymmetric relationship between groups of political actors described as patrons, brokers, and clients. In client politics, an organized interest group benefits at the expense of the public. Client politics may have a strong interaction with the dynamics of identity politics. This is particularly common in an elite pluralist or rigidly duopolistic system, such as in the United States, where lobbying can have considerable power in shaping public policy. The opposite of client politics is entrepreneurial politics, or conviction politics. Although many definitions for clientelism have been proposed, according to the political scientist Allen Hicken, it is generally thought that there are four key elements of clientelistic relationships:

- Dyadic relationships: Simply, these are two-way relationships.
- Contingency: Delivery of a service to a citizen by a politician or broker is contingent on the citizen's actions on behalf of the politician or party through which they are receiving services.
- Hierarchy: The politician or party is in a higher position of power than the citizen.
- Iteration: The relationship is not a one-off exchange, but rather, ongoing.

Contingency and iteration are the two components shared across most definitions of clientelism.

== Origins ==
The origin of the practice has been traced to ancient Rome. Here, relationships between the patron (patronus) and client (cliens) were seen as crucial to understanding the political process. While the obligations between these were mutual, the key point is that they were hierarchical. These relationships might be best viewed not as an entity but rather as a network (clientela), with the patronus himself perhaps being obligated to someone of greater power, and the cliens perhaps having more than one patron. These extensions increase the possibilities of conflicting interests arising. While the familia was the basic unit underlying Roman society, the interlocking networks (clientela) acted as restrictions on their autonomy but allowed a more complex society to develop. Historians of the late medieval period evolved the concept into bastard feudalism. There is, as is usual, ambiguity in the use of political terminology and the terms clientelism, the patron–client relationship, patronage, and the political machine are sometimes used to describe similar or related concepts.

The reigns of Julius Caesar (49–44 BCE) and Tiberius (14–16 AD) have been characterized as examples of widespread clientelism. In the 1500s, French political theorist Étienne de La Boétie did not use the term clientelism, but described the practice of emperors who used gifts to the public to gain loyalty from those who were eager to accept what amounted to bribery:

Tyrants would distribute largesse, a bushel of wheat, a gallon of wine, and a sesterce [coin], and then everybody would shamelessly cry, "Long live the King!" The fools did not realize that they were merely recovering a portion of their own property, and that their ruler could not have given them what they were receiving without having first taken it from them. A man might one day be presented with a sesterce and gorge himself at the public feast, lauding Tiberius and Nero for handsome liberality, who on the morrow, would be forced to abandon his property to their avarice, his children to their lust, his very blood to the cruelty of these magnificent emperors, without offering any more resistance than a stone or a tree stump. The mob has always behaved in this way—eagerly open to bribes.

== Mechanics ==
Susan Stokes et al. distinguish clientelism as a form of non-programmatic policy within distributive politics. It meets the criteria through failing to meet the two requirements of programmatic distribution, which are (1) 'formalized and public' and (2) 'shape actual distribution of benefits or resources'. Within non-programmatic policy, clientelism is then distinguished from "pork-barrel politics" in that voters are given a benefit or are able to avoid a cost conditional on their returning the favor with a vote. The patron/client system can be defined as a mutual arrangement between a person who has authority, social status, wealth, or some other personal resource (patron) and another who benefits from their support or influence (client). The patron provides selective access to goods and opportunities, and places themselves or their support in positions from which they can divert resources and services in their favor. Their partners-clients- are expected to buy support, and in some cases, votes. Patrons target low-income families to exchange their needed resources for their abundant resources: time, a vote, and insertion into networks of other potential supporters whom they can influence; however, patrons are unable to access the information needed to effectively form the exchange; thus they hire intermediaries, brokers, that more equipped to find out what the targeted voter needs, which voters will require less prodding, and if the voter followed through on their end of the bargain. As Stokes, Dunning, Nazareno, and Brusco emphasize, brokers in turn serve political leaders, and they may also not target resources exactly as leaders would wish; the resulting principal–agent problems can have important implications for understanding how clientelism works.

A key to understanding clientelism might come in stressing not only the mutually beneficial relationships of exchange but also asymmetries in power or standing. Implied is a certain selectivity in access to key resources and markets. Those with access, the patrons and/or sometimes sub-patrons or brokers, rely on the subordination and dependence of the clients. In return for receiving some benefits, the clients should provide political support. Standard modeling of clientelism assumes that politicians are able to monitor votes, and, in turn, reward or punish voters based on their choices. Quid pro quo would dissolve in the absence of such monitoring, rendering clientelism highly inefficient at best and completely ineffective at worst; however, evidence suggests that systematic monitoring of voter choice at the polls is surprisingly uncommon. Patronage, turnout buying, abstention buying, and vote buying are subcategories of clientelism. Patronage refers to an intra-party flow of benefits to members. Turnout buying, coined by Nichter, treats or bribes voters go to the polls, whereas abstention buying treats or bribes voters to keep them from going to the polls. Vote buying is a direct transfer of goods or services in exchange for one's support and vote. The result for the good or service is a question of "did you or will you vote for me?"

== Forms ==
Politicians can engage in clientelism on either (or both) a group or individual level. One way individual-level clientelism can manifest itself is in a vote-buying relationship: a politician gives a citizen goods or services, and, in exchange, that individual citizen promises to vote for that politician in the next election. Individual-level clientelism can also be carried out through coercion, where citizens are threatened with a lack of goods or services unless they vote for a certain politician or party. The relationship can also work in the opposite direction, where voters pressure politicians into clientelistic relationships in exchange for electoral support.

Stokes' research on clientelism in Argentina assumed that the Peronist Party was providing financial support to prospective voters to buy their votes. It was hypothesized that Peronists targeted moderately opposed voters because they were thought to be easily persuaded to change sides at the party's minimal expense. Stokes elaborated on the need of the Peronist Party to be able to track its clientele despite the secret ballot system. Stokes's argument was that the potential for vote buying depends on the accuracy with which the patron party, the Peronists in the case of Argentina, can monitor votes. She uses evidence to show that overall, smaller communities offer less anonymity, which makes it easier for the patrons to find out who is committed to supporting them. Thus, Stokes concluded that to be one of the reasons that vote buying is more frequent in relatively small communities. Another reason is that smaller communities are generally poorer. Furthermore, smaller communities, which are generally poorer and have a greater need for resources, are a more attractive target.

Research by Nichter promoted a simpler hypothesis for the Argentinian election cycle: to prove that Peronists were solely buying supporting voters' turnout, not all of their votes. He dismissed Stokes's arguments on patrons spying on smaller and poorer communities and instead said the Peronists initially targeted votes assumed to be their strong supporters. In that case, the patrons would be reasonably sure that they received a vote from a person who receives a good from them.

In many young low-income democracies, clientelism may assume the form of group-level targeting in which parties channel benefits to specific groups of voters that are conditional on past or future electoral support. For group-based targeting to work, parties must find efficient ways to distribute benefits while also holding voters accountable, ensuring that they keep their commitments. That leads parties to hire intermediaries, often referred to as 'brokers', who supply them with fine-grained information about who needs what and what sorts of voters will and will not vote for them, regardless of the benefit(s) provided. Party brokers are not the only type of intermediaries that mediate clientelist exchanges. There are also organizational brokers who represent specific interest groups but mobilize voters for multiple parties, hybrid brokers who also represent specific interest groups but demonstrate strong party loyalties, and independent brokers who neither represent specific group interests nor exhibit stable partisan attachments.

Scholarly consensus has thus far eluded the question of why parties channel clientelist benefits to certain groups more than others. Some of the earlier work on group-level targeting argues that politicians are more likely to direct party largesse to their co-ethnics because ethnicity helps parties solve the commitment problems that are so critical to making clientelism work. Some of the more contemporary work underscores the salience of partisan loyalties: politicians direct the bulk of their vote-buying efforts at persuadable swing voters, those who are either indifferent to the party's professed programmatic goals or moderately opposed to them. Some studies have challenged those claims but suggest that most instances of vote-buying in clientelist democracies might actually be instances of turnout-buying in which parties shower benefits on their most loyal supporters in the hope they will show up at the polling booth on election day. However, the lack of well-developed political machines does not preclude clientelist targeting. Recent studies have shown that in many emerging democracies, parties often lack the organizational capacity to monitor individual-level voting behavior and so they finetune their targeting strategies by updating their beliefs about what sorts of groups have been most responsive to their clientelist appeals.

== Contexts ==
Clientelism may not look the same from context to context. Several individual and country-level factors may shape if and how clientelism takes hold in a country, including the types of individual leaders, the socio-economic status of individuals, economic development, democratization, and institutional factors. In some contexts, clientelistic behavior is almost expected, as such interactions can become embedded in the formal political structures. Some types of leaders, such as hereditary traditional leaders, who remain in power for extended periods of time, are more effective in carrying out clientelistic relationships than others, such as elected officials. Research has also shown that politicians can benefit electorally from clientelistic relationships by gaining support from those who receive goods from them, but there are also potential costs since clientelistic politicians may lose support from wealthier voters, who do not engage in clientelistic relationships themselves and view the practice negatively. Not all voters view clientelistic behavior as a positive trait in politicians, especially voters of higher socioeconomic statuses. In short, there is no single factor that causes clientelism to take hold.

== Consequences ==
Clientelism has generally negative consequences on democracy and government and has more uncertain consequences on the economy. The accountability relationship in a democracy in which voters hold elected officials accountable for their actions is undermined by clientelism. That is because clientelism makes votes contingent on gifts to clients, rather than the performance of elected officials in office. Clientelism also degrades democratic institutions such as the secret ballot and administrative oversight. Such factors both weaken democratic institutions and negatively impact the efficiency of government.

Corruption and the perception of corruption have also been established as strongly correlated with clientelist systems for many reasons. One is that patrons often appear above the law in many clientelist systems. Also, some acts in clientelist systems, such as vote buying, could be inherently illegal. Finally, resources needed for patrons to maintain the clientelist system may require illicit means to obtain goods. A 2021 study found that voters in clientelist systems are less willing to punish corrupt politicians electorally.

Some scholars believe that because patrons focus on the control and procurement of private goods, they also neglect public goods such as roads and public schools, which aid economic development. Scholars also note that rent-seeking and corruption, prevalent in clientelist systems, could negatively impact the economy as well. Nevertheless, there is still great uncertainty in the economic effects of clientelism.

== Relations to corruption and underdevelopment ==
It is common to link clientelism with corruption; both involve political actors using public and private resources for personal gain, but they are not synonymous. Corruption is commonly defined as "dishonest and fraudulent conduct by those in power, typically involving bribery", while political clientelism is seen as "the distribution of benefits targeted to individuals or groups in exchange for electoral support". It is common to associate the two together because they moderately overlap. There are different forms of corruption that have nothing to do with clientelism, such as voter intimidation or ballot stuffing. As observed by Kawata:

Clientelism is considered negative because its intention is to generate 'private' revenue for patrons and clients and, as a result, obstructs 'public' revenue for members of the general community who are not a part of the patron–client arrangement.

Clientelism as a strategy of political organisation is substantially different from other strategies, which rely on appeals to wider programmatic objectives or simply emphasize higher degrees of competence. It is often assumed that clientelism is a vestige of political underdevelopment, a form of corruption, and that political modernization will reduce or end it. But alternative views stressing the persistence of clientelism – and the patronage associated with it – have been recognized.

== See also ==
- Big man (political science)
- Caciquism
- Politics of the belly
- Corruption
- Earmark (politics)
- Electoral district
- Cronyism
- Graft
- Identity politics
- Interest group liberalism
- Lobbying
- Minoritarianism
- Money loop
- Patrimonialism
  - Neopatrimonialism
- Pay to play
- Political corruption
- Political machine
- Pork barrel
- Political family
- Political dynasty
- Prebendalism
- Regulatory capture
- Rent-seeking
- Tammany Hall
- Votebank
