= The Origins of Political Order =

2011 book by Francis Fukuyama

- First edition cover
- Author: Francis Fukuyama
- Language: English
- Publisher: Farrar, Straus and Giroux
- Publication date: 2011
- Publication place: United States
- Media type: Paperback
- ISBN: 978-0-374-53322-9

The Origins of Political Order: From Prehuman Times to the French Revolution is a 2011 book by political economist Francis Fukuyama. The main thesis of the book covers three main components that give rise to a stable political order in a state: the state needs to be modern and strong, to obey the rule of law governing the state and be accountable. This theory is argued by applying comparative political history to develop a theory of the stability of a political system. The book covers several regions (China, India, Papua New Guinea as well as Western and Eastern Europe separately), and uses case studies of political developments from these regions, the scope is wide and consists of ancient history to the early modern period. Fukuyama refers to Amartya Sen's view that democracy remains the default political condition. Though not universally accepted as a form of government, even autocratic leaders have maintained semblance of democracy for legitimisation of their rule and use of media for their projection as democratic leaders. However, the situation in Iraq and Afghanistan challenges the assumption as there is no default reset to democracy once the sitting governments or leaders are removed.

== Series of books ==
The book is the first of two books on the development of political order. This book goes from its origins to the French Revolution. The next book Political Order and Political Decay: From the Industrial Revolution to the Present Day, published in September 2014, starts with the French Revolution and carries the analysis to the present day.

== Why states and institutions fail ==
The book is an attempt to understand why modern statebuilding and the building of institutions in countries like Afghanistan, Iraq, Somalia, Haiti, Timor-Leste, Sierra Leone and Liberia have failed to live up to expectations.

In the aftermath of its 2003 invasion of Iraq, the US administration seemed genuinely surprised when the Iraqi state itself collapsed in an orgy of looting and civil conflict.

The book is about "getting to Denmark," in other words creating a stable, democratic, prosperous, and uncorrupt state. Fukuyama points out that at the time of writing ninety contemporary 'primitive' societies had been engaged in war, suggesting that political order is preferable to primitive social structures if stability is to be achieved. The author describes how attempts at shaping countries outside the western world into western type democracies failed, and that this book was an attempt to find out why, by trying to find the true origins of political order, by tracing the histories of China, India, Europe and some Muslim countries from the point of view of three components.

== Aims and the analytical framework ==
Since the aim of the book is to understand how institutions and states develop in different countries, it is also a book on comparative historical research.

It is an extension of Samuel P. Huntington's Political Order in Changing Societies and similar in scope to Jared Diamond’s Guns, Germs, and Steel. Fukuyama admits that while developing foreword to a reprint edition of Samuel P. Huntington's classic he felt the need for serious updating of the content given that the world had witnessed momentous development from the collapse of Soviet Union and the communism as an ideology to the rise of East Asia. While developing the foreword to Huntington's work, Fukuyama considered it necessary to go back in history and look at the origins of political development and decay. Taking forward Samuel P. Huntington's framework for analysis of political order in societies and applying it to the problems of democracy, Fukuyama asked two questions; firstly, why certain societies had adopted democratic route and reached stable political order while some could not go beyond a certain stage in their march towards democracy and got stuck in autocracy? The second strand of the framework focused on the question as to whether democracy could respond and adapt to the new threats and challenges it is confronted with. Fukuyama also confessed that he did not have the insights of an anthropologist, economist or biologist but his broader landscape covering history of multiple countries across time and space revealed political patterns which might not be available to the experts in the fields mentioned above. The task that he had set for himself was too broad a landscape to cover in one volume particularly when civilisations like the Chinese, Indians or Muslims were involved. These societies had intricate power structures that drove strength from cultural and social values developed over centuries. The Guardian was quite critical in its review stating that

"Fukuyama borrows a phrase from contemporary social science to explain what he's really interested in: how to get to Denmark (ie a stable, prosperous, dynamic society, and one that now even has the world's best restaurant). But the history he offers here doesn't provide the answer. On its own, this book is Hamlet without the prince".

Fukuyama develops his argument with respect to the history of China, India and the Middle East before focusing on the way European countries developed in a variety of directions.

== From pre-human origins to states ==
=== From chimpanzee hunting groups to tribes ===
In his quest for the origins of political order, Fukuyama first looks at the social order among chimpanzees, notes that the war-like hunting group, rather than the family, was the primary social group, and claims the same for humans. Humans went further: to survive they formed tribes, whose armies were superior to hunting groups by their sheer size.

Fukuyama uses recent work in sociobiology and other sources to show that sociability built on kin selection and reciprocal altruism is the original default social state of man and not any isolated, presocial human (as suggested by Hobbes and Rousseau). For Fukuyuma, human beings do not enter into political life because of a conscious rational decision, instead, this communal organisation comes to them naturally. He suggests that Hobbes and Locke present a fallacy when they argue humans developed cooperative ability only as a result of the invention of the state. This is because chimps, genetically related to humans, engage in kin relations based on cooperation, and so Hobbes and Locke must be suggesting humans were once sociable, lost this instinct and then regained it due to the state.

=== Challenge of tribes on the road towards the state ===
The next step for human societies was to escape beyond tribalism and beyond the "tyranny of cousins", to join tribes into larger coalitions towards states, again due to the advantage of larger armies. This was done with the aid of religion. This was because as groups grew in size, maintaining cooperation became more difficult as face-to-face interactions with much of society became difficult. Religion offered a way of providing a combining social force to hold society together. For example, Fukuyama cites Mohammed as an example of what Weber labels a "charismatic leader" because he used the idea of an umma (community of believers) to bind together the territory that he ruled.

The challenge to transcend tribalism partly remains today in many parts of the world outside Western civilization, for example in Afghanistan and in Somalia.

==== Restrictions on marriage and inheritance as a strategy against corruption ====
Loyalty to the tribe or the family, rather than to the state, leads to corruption and weakening of the state. Various strategies were used to overcome the corruption. One such strategy was restrictions against marriage among the ruling official class to make sure that loyalties would not lie with family or tribe.

Mandarins or scholar-officials, who functioned as the ruling class of traditional China, were not allowed to pass on the lands given to them by the emperor to their own children and were restricted as to whom they could marry.

Mamluk slaves, the ruling class of medieval Egypt and a prominent element in the Ottoman Empire, were told which slaves to marry, while their children could not inherit from them. Janissaries were originally forced into celibacy and prohibited from having a family.

In Western Europe, Pope Gregory VII (in office: 1073 to 1085) cracked down on married Catholic priests, and they too were prohibited from having a family.

Spanish administrators in South America were restricted from marrying local women and from establishing family ties in the territories they were sent to.

== Three components of political order ==
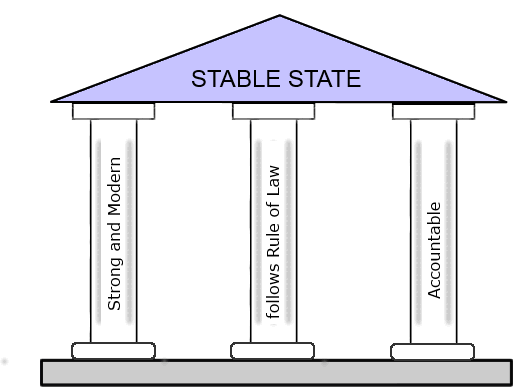
The three components/pillars of a stable state according to Fukuyama

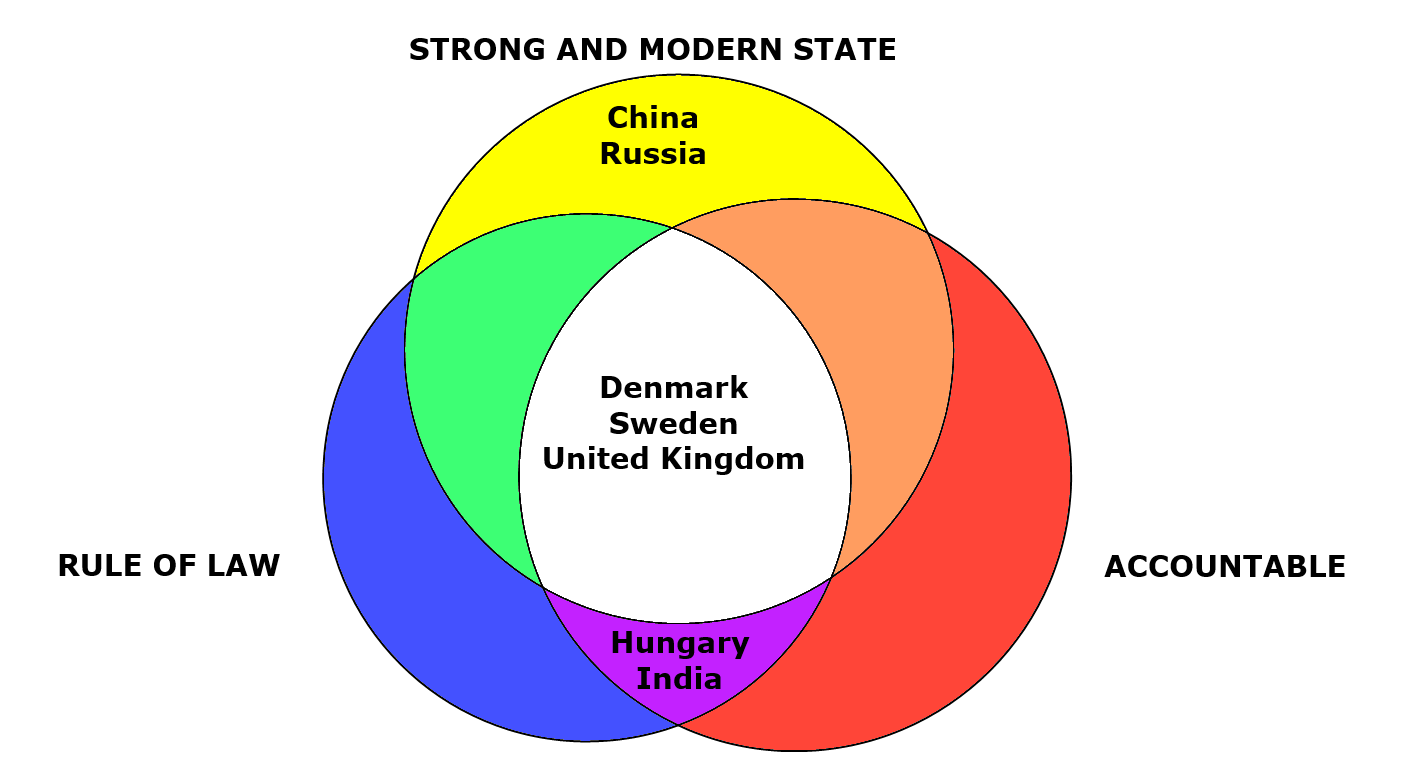
Origins of Political Order depend on three components, according to Fukuyama. States with all three components, are more stable, and are shown in the middle.

The books develops the idea of the development of the three components of a modern political order, which are:

1. State building
2. Rule of law
3. Accountable government

China, India, the Islamic world and Europe each developed these three components of political organization in different order, in different ways and to different degrees. Denmark and the United Kingdom arrived first at a modern balance of the three components in a single package, followed by others by the nineteenth century, as the Netherlands and Sweden.

=== China ===
China is described as having the first modern state under the Qin dynasty, by the definition given, since it established an educated Mandarin bureaucracy, although Hewson objects to this conclusion, arguing that the Mandarin bureaucracy was not characteristically modern. Qin China wielded extreme violence to cow its population (especially under the influence of legalism), but had a weak rule of law and the emperor had no accountability to anyone.

=== India ===
India is contrasted with China. India could not use extreme force on its population due to the traditional power of the brahmin priestly caste, who protested violence against the populace and war against neighboring states, by refusing to perform ancestral rituals for the Raja leaders. The power of the Brahmins weakening the state's power over its people, and effectively forced a strong accountability on its leaders to the population of India via its priestly class. An example Fukuyama gives of the influence religion had on early Indian rulers is Ashoka (304–232 BCE) of the Maurya Dynasty, who under the influence of Buddhism (rather than Brahmanism) came to regret his conquests in the Kalinga War. He vowed to end his empire, and eventually the entire political system collapsed.

=== Muslim states ===
Certain Muslim states developed the practice of making imported slaves as the ruling class, as with the Mamluks of Egypt and the Janissaries of the Ottoman empire, a process which started around the 8th century. Since these ruling class slaves were neither beholden to family nor to any tribe, but dependent only on the state, it ensured their loyalty towards the state. A later example would be the 16th-century Ottoman Empire practice of seeking out intelligent Christian children for high civil service or military positions, who were cut off from their family for their training.

=== Europe ===
In 11th-century Europe, instead of the state having the upper hand as in China, or the Brahmins having the upper hand as in India, there was a power conflict between state and church, the Investiture Controversy between Pope Gregory VII and Henry IV, Holy Roman Emperor.

The papal party started to search for sources of law to strengthen its case for the universal jurisdiction of the church. They rediscovered the Justinian Code, the Corpus Iuris Civilis, in a library near Bologna in northern Italy in 1072, leading later to the student body called a "universitas", first in Bologna, and soon after in Paris, Oxford, Heidelberg, Cracow, and Copenhagen studying the code and displacing particularistic Salic law. The laws gave the Gregory the authority to excommunicate Henry IV, who was forced to walk to Canossa from Germany to Italy, stand barefoot in the snow for three days outside Canossa and to ask forgiveness from the pope on his knees. The Concordat of Worms ended the struggle between popes and emperors in 1122. It created balance between royal power and religious tradition not seen anywhere else before.

Catholic leaders became accountable to the clergy and to the pope, who historically frequently objected to violence and wars, just as their counterparts in India had done, but in Europe the clergy did not weaken the states as much as Brahmins had done in India. The papal intercessions against wars between Catholic countries also led to the survival of small states in Europe, similar to India, but in contrast to what had happened in China. The existence of small states who were restricted by the church from recruiting mass armies waging wars costly in casualties, as had been the case in China, combined with the existence of independent university scholars, led to military innovations on land and sea to empower fewer soldiers to wield wars effectively and later gave these relatively small countries a military advantage large enough to conquer colonies in the rest of the world. Western Europe began getting the best of both worlds. In England, the rise of common law also strengthened the rule of law. With the reformation, the Lutheran priest N.F.S. Grundtvig in Denmark advocated general literacy since they believed that every Christian should read the bible and established schools throughout the country, leading to voting rights 1849. In Denmark this led to the state gradually being more accountable to the general population, since they could now vote and read. In England and Denmark a balance was finally struck between the three components of political order.

== Balance between the components ==
A successful modern liberal democracy balances all three components to achieve stability.

In China a strong modern state came to power first and the state subjugated any potential agents that might have demanded the other two components. In China, the priestly class did not develop into an organized independent religion, as the priests were in the service of the Emperor. Numerous times, therefore, imperial dynasties collapsed.

In India, the Brahmins became organised into a strong upper caste of India and the warrior/state caste was held to account by a rule of law as interpreted by the Brahmins. Because the state was weakened by this limitation, attempts at unifying India under one rule did not last very long.

In Europe, there was a long period when the emperors and popes were in conflict, creating a balance of power between them, and ultimately leading to a situation where some small states developed a stable balance between the three components in the United Kingdom, Denmark and Sweden.

== See also ==
- Political history of the world
- The evolutionary origins of cooperation
- Sociobiology
