= Béatrice Hibou =

French political scientist

- Education: Sciences Po; School for Advanced Studies in the Social Sciences
- Scientific career
- Fields: Political science
- Workplaces: Sciences Po; Institut d'études politiques de Bordeaux; University of Paris 1 Pantheon-Sorbonne; Ecole de Gouvernance et d'Economie de Rabat
- Doctoral advisor: Jean Coussy

Béatrice Hibou is a French political scientist, research director and teacher at Sciences Po. She studies political economy and trade policy with a particular focus on Sub-Saharan Africa and the Maghreb, the role of market forces in shaping state policies and structure and how that affects people's lives.

== Education and positions ==
Hibou attended Sciences Po, obtaining her undergraduate degree in 1987. In 1995, Hibou graduated from The School for Advanced Studies in the Social Sciences with a doctorate in economics. Her doctoral dissertation was entitled Économie politique de la protection en Afrique (The political economy of protection in Africa), and used a Weberian framework to study trade policy in Sub-Saharan Africa. Her thesis supervisor was Jean Coussy.

In 1998 Hibou joined the faculty at Sciences Po and Institut d'études politiques de Bordeaux. From 2006 to 2010 she taught a seminar at the School for Advanced Studies in the Social Sciences, in 2010 she moved to the University of Paris 1 Pantheon-Sorbonne, and then in 2013 to the Ecole de Gouvernance et d'Economie in Rabat, Morocco.

== Research ==
Hibou studies the international political economy of the Middle East and North Africa, Sub-Saharan Africa, and Southern Europe, using the work of Michel Foucault and Max Weber to reflect on the nature of state economic reforms and political power.

From the work for her doctoral thesis, Hibou developed the 1996 book L'Afrique est-elle protectionniste? Les chemins buissonniers de la libéralisation extérieure, which studied the political economy of development using cases of policy, fraud, and smuggling in former French colonies of Sub-Saharan Africa. Hibou was the editor of the 1999 book La Privatisation des États (The privatization of states). The book studied the ongoing process of privatization around the world, studying the trend across many countries to give private companies control over functions that had previously been the prerogative of the state.

In 2006 she published the book La force de l'obéissance. Économie politique de la répression en Tunisie (The Force of Obedience: The Political Economy of Repression in Tunisia), which was based on field work that she conducted in Tunisia between 1997 and 2005. The book studied subjugation in Tunisia beyond the readily apparent authoritarian repression, focusing instead on how the economy systemically subjugated Tunisians during that period under the pretense of voluntary work.

Hibou's 2011 book, Anatomie politique de la domination (Political anatomy of domination), analysed and compared types of authoritarian governments. The book was reviewed in Le Monde. Hibou's work has been cited, or she has been interviewed, in news outlets including Le Parisien, Libération, and The Diplomat.

Hibou developed an idea of bureaucratie néolibérale (neoliberal bureaucracy) which consists of the systematic use of standards, rules, procedures, and norms that are derived primarily from the market or the world of business and have an impact on daily life. This mechanism enables the liberal market to formally impose itself on fields which are not obviously connected to it, such as the field of education. Hibou has been a member of the editorial board of Politique africaine, Critique internationale, and the Karthala book series Les Afriques.

== Engagement in favour of academic freedom ==
Béatrice Hibou is an active member of the Support Committee of Fariba Adelkhah and Roland Marchal, who were both arrested and made scientific prisoners in Iran in June 2019. Although Roland Marchal was released on 20 March 2020, Fariba Adelkhah has remained a prisoner in Iran and Béatrice Hibou still appears, as a member of the support committee, in French and international media outlets, where she explains, in particular, the development of the case, the conditions of detention in Iran and more broadly, the issues of scientific freedom.

== Selected works ==
- L'Afrique est-elle protectionniste?: les chemins buissonniers de la libéralisation extérieure
- La Privatisation des États, editor (1999)
- La force de l'obéissance. Économie politique de la répression en Tunisie (2006)
- Anatomie politique de la domination, La découverte (2011)
- La bureaucratisation du monde à l'ère néolibérale, La découverte (2012)
- Tisser le temps politique au Maroc: Imaginaire de l'Etat à l'âge néolibéral [Weaving Political Time in Morocco: The Imaginary of the State in the Neoliberal Age]. co-authored with Mohamed Tozy. Karthala Editions. 2020. ISBN 978-2-8111-2767-1.
