= Neopatrimonialism =

Patron-client relationship using state resources

Neopatrimonialism is a system of social hierarchy where patrons use state resources to secure the loyalty of clients in the general population. It is an informal patron–client relationship that can reach from very high up in state structures down to individuals in small villages.

Neo-patrimonialism may underlie or supplant the bureaucratic structure of the state in that only those with connections have the real power, not those who hold higher positions. Further criticisms include that it undermines political institutions and the rule of law, and is a corrupt (but not always illegal) practice. Neopatrimonialism also has its benefits, however. Neopatrimonialism can extend the reach of the state into the geographical and social peripheries of the country, provide short term stability, and facilitate communal integration.

Neo-patrimonialism, as defined by author Christopher Clapham of The Nature of the Third World State, is a "...form of organisation in which relationships of a broadly patrimonial type pervade a political and administrative system which is formally constructed on rational-legal lines." It is a system in which an office of power is used for personal uses and gains, as opposed to a strict division of the private and public spheres.

Outside of Africa, the Politics of Russia under Vladimir Putin and the presidency of Donald Trump in the United States have been described as exhibiting characteristics of neopatrimonialism.

== Origin and definition of the term ==
"Neopatrimonialism" as a distinct term is generally held to have originated with Shmuel N. Eisenstadt, in his 1973 book Traditional Patrimonialism and Modern Neopatrimonialism, deriving it from Max Weber's term, 'patrimonialism', who used the term to describe a system of rule based on administrative and military personnel, who were responsible only to the ruler. Neopatrimonialism, which is a modern form of the traditional Patrimonial form of rule, is a mixed system. Here elements of patrimonial and rational-bureaucratic rule co-exist and are sometimes interwoven.

== Application and criticism ==
Neopatrimonialism is sometimes used as a way of explaining why African states have supposedly failed to effect neoliberal market reforms. This focus is controversial, with some complaining that the term is vague, and others that its use has failed to take into account the politics of non-African states. For example, in 1998 Thandika Mkandawire said,

Another problem is that "neo-patrimonial" states in and outside Africa have pursued a wide range of policies including some that are squarely developmental. In other words, other than indicating the style of governance, neo-patrimonialism does not tell us much about what policies a state will pursue and with what success. In the African case "neo-patrimonialism" has been used to explain import substitution, export orientation, parastatals, privatization, the informal sector development, etc. The result is that, in seeking to explain everything, it explains nothing except perhaps that capitalist relations in their idealized form are not pervasive in Africa.

Others have argued that the concept is valid and needs refinement. For example, a paper in 2004 identified political difficulties in Bangladesh as having their origins in the neopatrimonial system that had evolved there.

== Africa ==
Being the vertical distribution of resources that give rise to patron-client networks based around a powerful individual or party, neopatrimonialism was once argued as necessary for unification and development after decolonization. Though neopatrimonialism seems like a form of corruption through coercion, it is not regarded as corrupt behavior by most countries where neopatrimonialism is present. Neopatrimonialism is not seen as a synonym for corruption, but a distinct form of acquiring legitimacy and of dealing with difficulties in statecraft specific to Africa deeply rooted from pre-colonial times. For the weak state institutions left behind from colonial rule to gain legitimacy from the population being ruled, state leaders are left to either gain legitimacy through force or by paying off people and giving government positions in exchange for support of the ruling leader. Neopatrimonialism is the latter and was seen by governments attempting to gain legitimacy as a less violent and brutal way to rule, though often unstable.

Nicolas van de Walle argues that neopatrimonialism is very prevalent in Africa since the departure of colonialism. African regimes are presidential, which facilitates clientelism since power is concentrated in a single individual with ultimate control of networks. As Joel S. Migdal puts it, the state in African countries seems omnipresent in all aspects of people's lives, from the very local to the central government levels. Van de Walle introduces the notion that in Africa, states are hybrid regimes where patrimonial practices and bureaucracies coexist to a higher or lesser degree. African states have laws and constitutional order and in parallel are ruled by patrimonial logic in which political authority is based on clientelism and office holders constantly appropriate public resources for their own benefit. The dual nature of African regimes means that clientelism is not incidental and cannot be easily corrected with capacity building policies and at the same time formal structures play an important role, even in the least-institutionalized states.

During the African Debt Crisis, neopatrimonialism showed various signs of weakness. As African countries accumulated massive amounts of debt caused by global recession and inflation from the OPEC oil embargo, the neopatrimonialist links that helped solidify legitimacy for regimes began to weaken. African countries had relied so heavily on foreign aid and loans as source of government income that when these resources dried up, regimes could no longer pay off the people they been paying or provide government jobs for those they had because regimes did not have the money to do so. This led to a lack of legitimacy in many countries resulting in rebellion.

In a 1994 study, Michael Bratton and Nicolas Van de Walle argue that the prevalence of neopatrimonial regimes in Africa explains why many African states have not successfully democratized. To be democratized, one of the key components needed is a change in political culture. Defined as the shared political ideas, attitudes, and beliefs that underlie a society, political culture in neopatrimonial regime is one where people see the government as their provider for goods and without the government providing, the government is of little use to the people. There is no shared political ideology in most of these countries let alone stable enough economies. Thus, democratic political systems never can get a foot hold in a lot of African countries where the system is so embedded in neopatrimonialism. Often, the only way to break free of this system is through a rebellion or military coup.

According to Van de Walle, one of the main issues with neopatrionialism is that it undermines economic reform in contemporary Africa on multiple levels. Christian von Soest follows that, in African states, this informal political system of the rulers infringes on the collection of taxes and causes a reduction in state revenues. Joel Migdal points out that state leaders will fragment power and use different techniques to prevent reform and policy from being implemented in local branches and institutions, as a way to avoid important local agencies to mobilize against the central power. The main goal of central leaders is to avoid losing power and control, even if that means stalling policy implementation.

== See also ==
- Authoritarianism
- Democracy
- Democratization
- Patronage in ancient Rome
- Political machine
- Politics of the Belly
- Prebendalism
