= Politique africaine =

- Discipline: Political sciences
- Language: French
- Edited by: Vincent Bonnecase, Julien Brachet

Publication details
- History: 1981–present
- Publisher: Éditions Karthala (France)
- Frequency: Quarterly

Standard abbreviations
- ISO 4: Polit. Afr.

Indexing
- ISSN: 0244-7827
- LCCN: 90650201
- OCLC no.: 192057512

Links
- Journal homepage

Politique africaine is a quarterly peer-reviewed francophone academic journal that publishes articles and book reviews on current issues in African politics. It was established in 1981 by Jean-François Bayart and Christian Coulon in response to classical approaches on Africa, and is published by Éditions Karthala.
