= Pacification =

Pacification may refer to:

The restoration of peace through a declaration or peace treaty:

- Pacification of Ghent, an alliance of several provinces of the Netherlands signed on November 8, 1576
- Treaty of Berwick (1639), or Pacification of Berwick, signed on June 18, 1639 between England and Scotland
- Pacification sejm, one of several sessions of the Sejm, especially the one in 1736 concluding the civil war in the Polish–Lithuanian Commonwealth
- Pacification of 1917, between religious and secular sects in the Netherlands

A military or police action:

- Pacification of Algeria (1835–1903), French military operations which aimed to put an end to various tribal rebellions
- Occupation of Araucanía (1861–1883), also Pacification of the Araucanía, the actions which led to the incorporation of Araucanía into Chile
- Pacification of Ukrainians in Eastern Galicia (1930), a punitive action of Polish police against the Ukrainian minority in Poland
- Pacification of Manchukuo, a campaign during the Second Sino-Japanese War (March 1932-1941)
- Pacification operations in German-occupied Poland, the use of German military force to suppress Polish resistance during World War II
- Pacification of Tonkin, a military and political campaign undertaken by the French in northern Vietnam
- Pacification of Wujek, a strike-breaking action against miners in Katowice, Poland, 1981
- Dutch intervention in Lombok and Karangasem or Pacification of Lombok in 1894
- Pacification of Libya, a military against by the Royal Italian Army against the Libyan resistance
- Campaigns of Pacification and Occupation (late-19th century–early-20th century), Portuguese military campaigns in their African colonies

An analytic approach to understanding the security-industrial complex:

A military, political, economic, and social process of establishing or reestablishing control by a government over a population impacted and divided by insurgency.

- Hearts and Minds (Vietnam)
- Winning hearts and minds

A policing, military, political, economic, and social process of establishing or reestablishing control by a government over a population impacted by violent crime.

- Pacifying Police Unit (Rio State, Brazil)

Other meanings:

- Violent Pacification an album by Dirty Rotten Imbeciles
- Army of Cuban Pacification Medal, medal issued to members of the US occupation force in Cuba following the Spanish–American War (1906–1909)

== See also ==
- Colonialism
- Counterinsurgency
- Gunboat diplomacy
- Imperialism
- Interventionism (politics)
- Pax imperia
- Peace (law)
- Peace enforcement
- Peacemaking
- Police action
