= Intervention (international law) =

Use of force by one state to interfere in the affairs of another

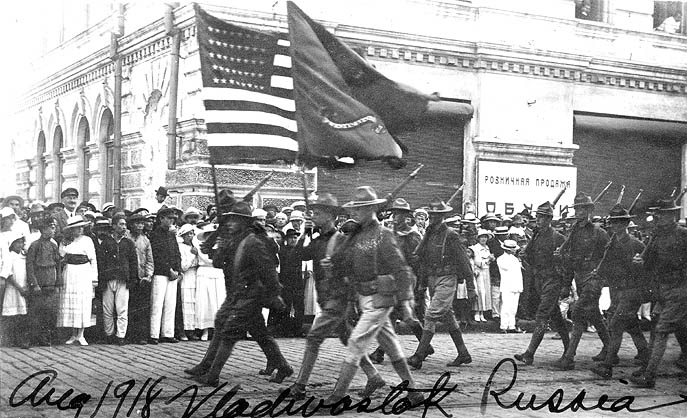
Intervention, American Wolfhounds on parade in Vladivostok, August 1918

Intervention, in terms of international law, is the term for the use of force by one country or sovereign state in the internal or external affairs of another. With regard to the use of force, Article 2(4) of the United Nations (UN) Charter provides: "All Members shall refrain in their international relations from the threat or use of force against the territorial integrity or political independence of any state, or in any other manner inconsistent with the Purposes of the United Nations." Nevertheless, international law recognises three exceptions to this general prohibition: (1) intervention upon the request of a legitimate government; (2) intervention authorised by the United Nations Security Council (UNSC), as stipulated in Article 42 of the UN Charter; and (3) the inherent right of individual or collective self-defence, as outlined in Article 51 of the Charter. Consequently, any other use of force or form of intervention is, under international law, considered unlawful.

== Definitions ==
L. F. L. Oppenheim defines intervention as a forcible or dictorial interference by a state in the affairs of another state calculated to impose certain conduct or consequences on that other state.

== History ==
According to Hans J. Morgenthau, legal prohibitions on interventionism in the 19th century were intended to protect new nation-states from interference by long-standing, powerful monarchies.

== Intervention by invitation or on request ==
When a state interferes in the political affairs of another state by invitation, or on request, it can not be considered as an unlawful act. Interference of a state can never be unlawful if it is for the sake of humanity. It is necessary that the two states agree on the matter of intervention through a treaty. A request for assistance is not an unlawful act. As for the invitation part, this needs to come from the state itself. It must come from the highest available governmental authority, it must be provided free from pressure, and it must be issued prior to the use of force. The ensuing use of force must remain within the limits of the invitation.

Intervention by invitation (IbI) may or may not involve combat; an example of the latter might involve only power projection. The International Court of Justice declared in a 1986 judgment on Nicaragua that IbI from a lawful government is lawful while IbI from rebels groups is unlawful. Some cases of intervention by invitation documented since the millennium are:

- France in Mali,
- the US-led coalition in Iraq,
- Saudi Arabia in Yemen,
- Russia in Syria,
- ECOWAS in The Gambia

== Intervention with authorisation of the UN Security Council ==
The use of force on foreign territory may also be justified when authorised by the UN Security Council. This exception is set out in Article 42 of the UN Charter, which states: "[The Security Council] may take such action by air, sea, or land forces as may be necessary to maintain or restore international peace and security. Such action may include . . . operations by air, sea, or land forces of Members of the United Nations."

== Individual or collective self-defence ==
The third exception to the prohibition on the use of force is the right to self-defence, exercised in response to an armed attack by a foreign state. This is articulated in Article 51 of the UN Charter, which provides: "Nothing in the present Charter shall impair the inherent right of individual or collective self-defence if an armed attack occurs against a Member of the United Nations."

== See also ==
- Gunboat diplomacy
- Humanitarian intervention
- Interventionism (politics)
- Pacification
- Police action
