= HMS Resolution (1892) =

Royal Sovereign-class battleship

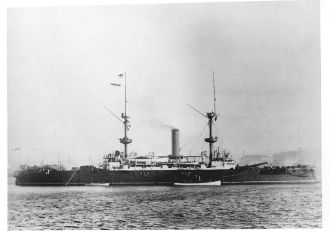
- HMS Resolution

History

United Kingdom
- Name: Resolution
- Builder: Palmers Shipbuilding and Iron Company, Jarrow
- Cost: £875,522, plus £78,295 for guns
- Laid down: 14 June 1890
- Launched: 28 May 1892
- Completed: November 1893
- Commissioned: 5 December 1893
- Decommissioned: 8 August 1911
- Fate: Sold for scrapping, 2 April 1914

General characteristics
- Class & type: Royal Sovereign-class pre-dreadnought battleship
- Displacement: 14,190 long tons (14,420 t), 15,580 long tons (15,830 t) full load
- Length: 410 ft 5 in (125.10 m) overall
- Beam: 75 ft (23 m)
- Draught: 27 ft 6 in (8.38 m)
- Installed power: 9000 ihp
- Propulsion: Twin coal-fired Humphreys & Tennant 3-cylinder triple-expansion engines, two screws;
- Speed: 15.7 knots max
- Range: 2,780 nautical miles (5,149 km) at 14 knots (26 km/h); 4,720 nautical miles (8,741 km) at 10 knots (18.5 km/h)
- Armament: 2 × twin 13.5 in (343 mm) guns; 10 × single 6 in (152 mm) guns; 10 × single 6-pdr (57 mm (2.2 in)) guns; 12 × single 3-pdr (47 mm (1.9 in)) guns; 6 × 18-inch (450-mm) torpedo tubes (2 submerged)
- Armour: Main belt: 14–18 in (356–457 mm); Upper belt: 3–4 in (76–102 mm); Forward Bulkheads: 16 in (406 mm); After bulkhead: 14 in (356 mm); Barbettes: 11–17 in (279–432 mm); Casemates: 6 in (152 mm); Conning Tower: 14 in (356 mm); Deck: 2.5–3 in (64–76 mm)

HMS Resolution was a Royal Sovereign-class pre-dreadnought battleship of the Royal Navy. The ship was built by Palmers Shipbuilding and Iron Company, starting with her keel laying in June 1890. She was launched in May 1892 and, after completing trials, was commissioned into the Channel Squadron the following December. She was armed with a main battery of four 13.5-inch guns and a secondary battery of ten 6-inch guns. The ship had a top speed of 16.5 knots.

Resolution served with the Channel Squadron up to 1901; she took part in the Diamond Jubilee Fleet Review and a number of manoeuvres in the Atlantic and the Southwest Approaches. She was recommissioned as a coast guard ship later in 1901 and underwent a refit in 1903, after which she served at Sheerness as a port guard ship, before entering the Fleet Reserve at Chatham in June 1904. She suffered damage while participating in combined manoeuvres in 1906, and was recommissioned into the Special Service Division of the Home Fleet the following year. She was decommissioned in August 1911 and laid up at Motherbank for disposal, before being sold for scrap in April 1914 and towed to the Netherlands to be broken up the following month.

== Design ==
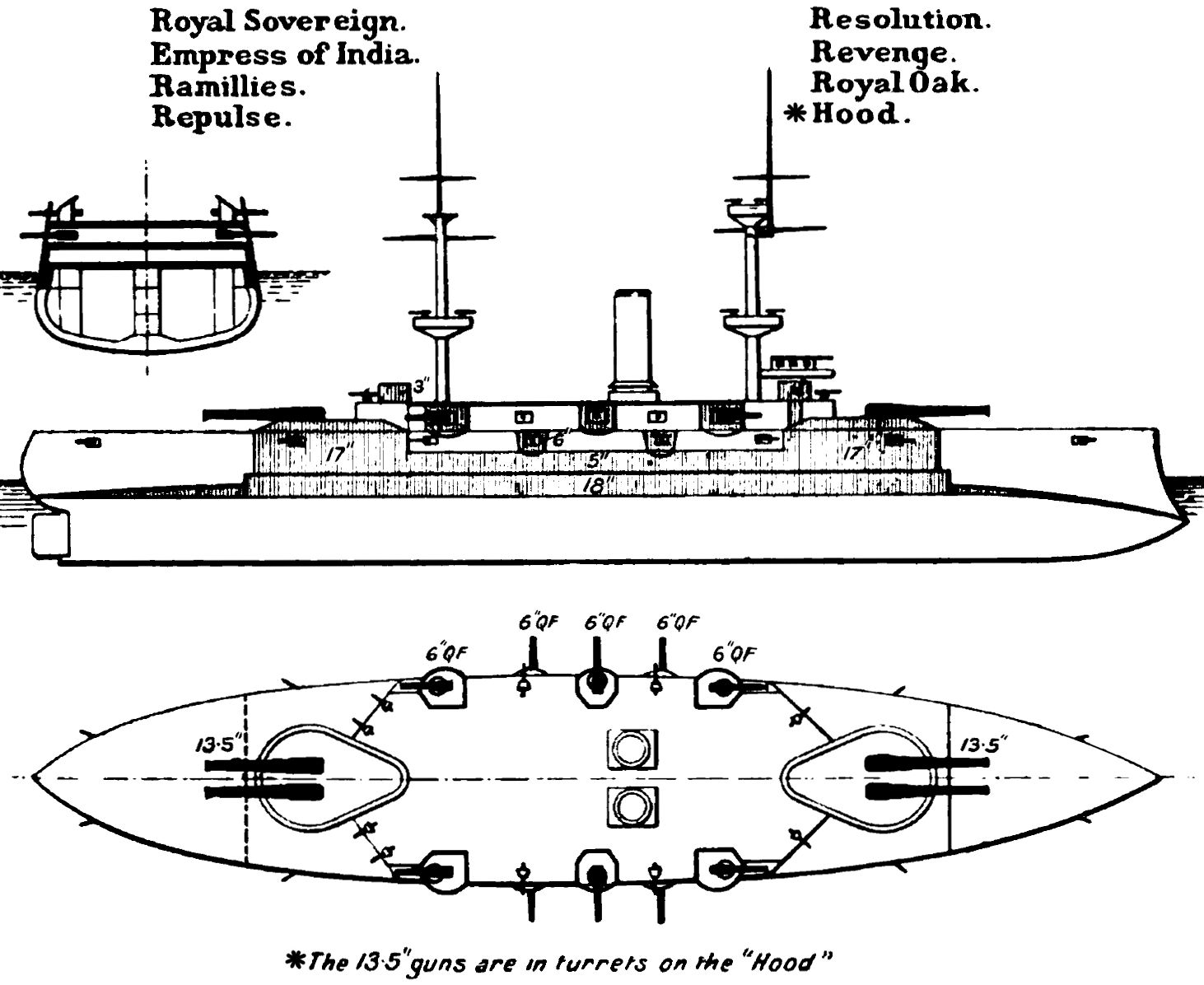
Right elevation and deck plan as depicted in Brassey's Naval Annual 1905.

The Royal Sovereign-class battleships were based on Admiral-class barbette ships, but contained several alterations. The freeboard was raised, the barbettes' armour was extended and an upper belt and secondary armour were added. They could also obtain a higher speed, but were 4,000 tons larger. Resolution was 410 feet (120 m) long overall and had a beam of 75 ft and a draft of 27 ft 6in. She displaced up to 15,580 tons at her full combat load. Her propulsion system consisted of two 3-cylinder triple expansion engines powered by eight coal-fired cylindrical boilers. With natural draught, her engines provided a top speed of 15.5 knots at 9,000 indicated horsepower; 16.5 knots at 11,000 indicated horsepower could be obtained with forced draught. She had a maximum complement of 712 officers and ratings, although her crew in 1903 amounted to 672 people. When built, ships of the Royal Sovereign class rolled too heavily under certain conditions. Bilge keels were added to compensate for the problem, and the ships "proved to be excellent seaboats quite capable ... of maintaining high speeds in a seaway". The ships were well-constructed and probably the most substantial built for the Royal Navy, even if they "suffered ... from excessive weight and fittings." In the view of the maritime historian R. A. Burt, they were "highly successful; at that time, they were probably unequalled in all-round fighting efficiency."

Resolution was armed with four breech-loading 13.5-inch guns on two barbettes with armour ranging from 11 to 17 inches in thickness. Resolution also carried ten quick-fire (QF) 6-inch guns, four of which were mounted in casemates on the main deck, plus sixteen QF 6-pounder (2.2 in (57 mm)) guns of an unknown type and a dozen QF 3-pounder (1.9 in (47 mm)) Hotchkiss guns. She was also equipped with seven 18-inch torpedo tubes, two of which were submerged. Between 1899 and 1902, the 3-pounder guns were removed from the upper tops; the above-water torpedo tubes were removed in 1902–1905. The remaining 6-inch guns on the upper deck were mounted on 5-inch armoured casemates between 1902 and 1904. All of the armour was supplied by the builders, Palmers Shipbuilding and Iron Company. The waterline belt was 252 ft long by 8 ft 8in deep, and its armour varied in thickness between 14 and 18 inches; the bulkheads were protected by 14 to 16 inches of armour. The middle deck covering the belt was 3 inches thick and the lower deck forward and aft of the belt was 2.5 inches thick, while the upper belt between the middle and main decks was coated in 3 to 4 inches of armour. The casemates for the 6-inch guns were protected by an equal thickness of armour and the conning tower was protected with 14 inch armour on the forward side, and 3 inches of armour on the aft. The ship's armoured deck was 2.5 to 3 inches thick.

== Operational history ==
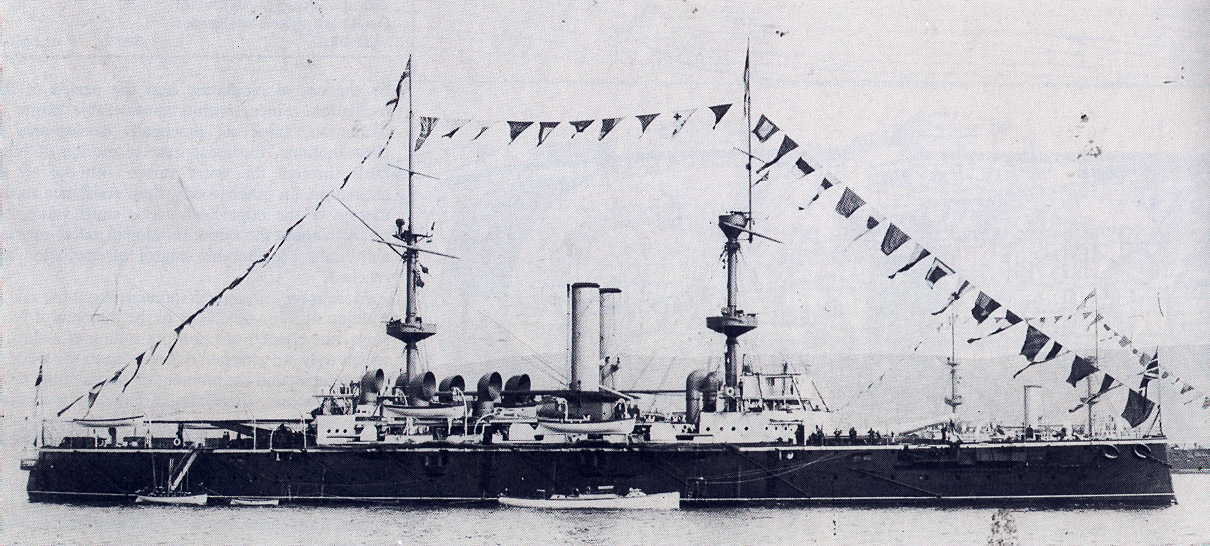
Resolution dressed overall in 1895.

Resolution was built by Palmer Shipbuilding and Iron Company, at a cost of £875,522, plus £78,295 for guns. She was laid down on 14 June 1890, launched on 28 May 1892 and completed the following November. She underwent trials in December 1893, and was commissioned at Portsmouth on 5 December of that year for service in the Channel Squadron. On a voyage to Gibraltar shortly after commissioning, she suffered heavy rolling in bad weather and was forced to return to Ireland, and then to Devonport for repairs. Questions were raised in Parliament about her stability and endurance. In early August 1894, Resolution was a unit of "Fleet Red" in the annual manoeuvres held in the Southwest Approaches. She was recommissioned for further Channel Fleet service on 9 April 1895. On 18 July 1896, she collided with her sister ship HMS Repulse, suffering slight plating and keel damage. She nonetheless took part in annual manoeuvres from 24 July 1896 to 30 July 1896, this time off the southwest coasts of England and Ireland as part of "Fleet A".

On 26 June 1897, Resolution was part of the Fleet Review at Spithead for the Diamond Jubilee of Queen Victoria. From 29 July 1899 to 4 August 1899, she participated in annual manoeuvres in the Atlantic as part of "Fleet A". The next summer, she again took part in the annual manoeuvres in the Southwest Approaches in late July and early August 1900, this time as a part of "Fleet A2". She paid off at Portsmouth on 9 October 1901 and was placed in reserve, but on 17 November 1901 she was recommissioned by Captain James Goodrich to serve as a coast guard ship at Holyhead with the officers and crew of the previous guardship, the battleship HMS Colossus.

Captain Cecil Burney was appointed in command on 27 May 1902, as flag captain to Rear-Admiral George Atkinson-Willes, Second-in-Command of the Home Fleet during the Coronation Review held at Spithead on 16 August 1902 for the coronation of King Edward VII. After the end of the maneuvers, Captain John Edward Bearcroft was appointed in command on 16 September 1902, when she reverted to her position at Holyhead and Rear-Admiral Atkinson-Willes transferred his flag to the battleship HMS Empress of India. On 8 April 1903, she paid off into reserve again to undergo a refit.

Resolution was recommissioned on 5 January 1904 to relieve the battleship HMS Sans Pareil as port guard ship at Sheerness. On 20 June 1904, she was transferred to the Fleet Reserve at Chatham. In the summer of 1906, she took part in manoeuvres during which she suffered slight damage when she collided with her sister ship HMS Ramillies near the Tongue Lightship on 15 July 1906. (Note: Burt, p. 84; however, Burt p. 81, says the collision date was 16 June 1906.) Later that year, she underwent another refit at Chatham. On 12 February 1907, Resolution transferred to the Special Service Division of the Home Fleet at Devonport. She remained in that service until 8 August 1911. She was then laid up at the Motherbank, awaiting disposal. On 2 April 1914, Resolution was sold as scrap for £35,650 to F. Rijsdijk; the following month, she was towed to the Netherlands to be broken up.

== Gallery ==
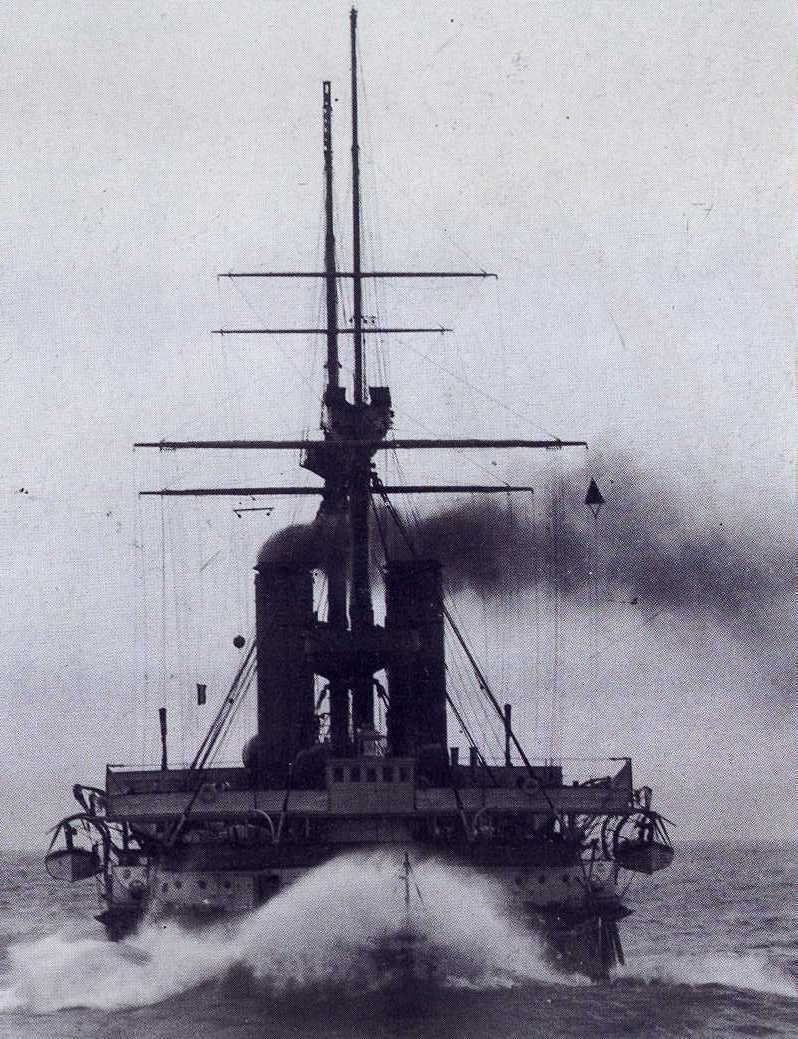
Resolution in 1897-1898

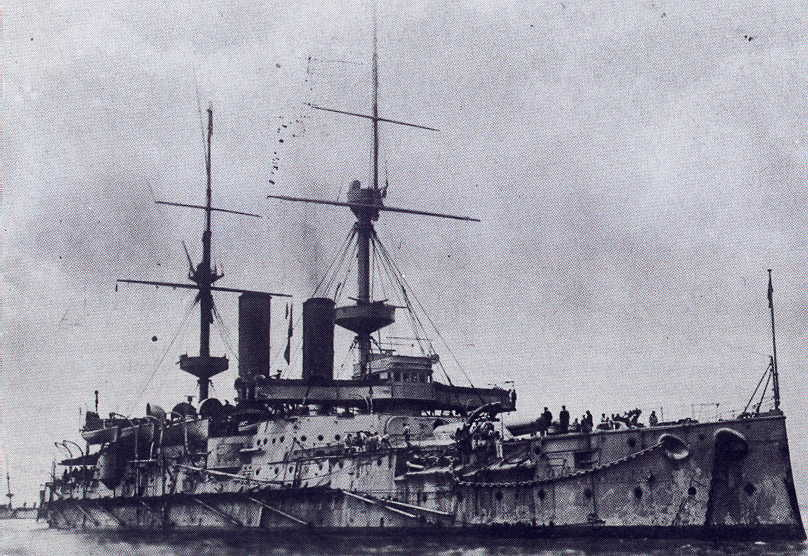
Resolution in 1903

== Bibliography ==
- Burt, R. A. (1988). British Battleships 1889–1904. Annapolis: Naval Institute Press. ISBN 978-0-87021-061-7.
- Gardiner, Robert, ed. (1979). Conway's All the World's Fighting Ships 1860–1905. Greenwich: Conway Maritime Press. ISBN 978-0-8317-0302-8.
