= Humanitarian intervention =

Military intervention for humanitarian reasons

Humanitarian intervention is the use or threat of military force by a state (or states) across borders with the intent of ending severe and widespread human rights violations in a state which has not given permission for the use of force. Humanitarian interventions are aimed at ending human rights violations of individuals other than the citizens of the intervening state. Attempts to establish institutions and political systems to achieve positive outcomes in the medium- to long-run, such as peacekeeping, peace-building and development aid, do not fall under this definition of a humanitarian intervention.

There is not one standard or legal definition of humanitarian intervention. Nonetheless, there is a general consensus on some of its essential characteristics:

1. Humanitarian intervention involves the threat and use of military forces as a central feature.
2. It is an intervention in the sense that it entails interfering in the internal affairs of a state by sending military forces into the territory or airspace of a sovereign state that has not committed an act of aggression against another state.
3. The intervention is in response to situations that do not necessarily pose direct threats to states' strategic interests, but instead is motivated by humanitarian objectives.

The customary international law concept of humanitarian intervention dates back to Hugo Grotius and the European politics in the 17th century. However, that customary law has been superseded by the UN Charter, which prohibits the use of force in international relations, subject to two exhaustive exceptions: UN Security Council action taken under Chapter VII, and self-defence against an armed attack. The type and frequency of humanitarian interventions have changed drastically since the 19th century, with a massive increase in humanitarian interventions since the end of the Cold War. Historically, humanitarian interventions were limited to rescuing one's own citizens in other states or to rescue ethnically or religiously similar groups (e.g. Christian countries intervening on behalf of Christians in non-Christian countries). Over the course of the 20th century (in particular after the end of the Cold War), subjects perceived worthy of humanitarian intervention expanded beyond religiously and ethnically similar groups to encompass all peoples.

The subject of humanitarian intervention highlights the tension between the principle of state sovereignty – a defining pillar of the UN system and international law – and evolving international norms related to human rights and the use of force. The legal justification for humanitarian interventions without the authorization of the UN Security Council remains extremely controversial. There are normative and empirical debates over its legality, the ethics of using military force to respond to human rights violations, when it should occur, who should intervene, and whether it is effective. Its frequent use following the end of the Cold War suggested to many that a new norm of military humanitarian intervention was emerging in international politics.

== History ==
The notion of humanitarian interventions, understood as interventions in other states to stop human rights abuses, has been observed since the 19th century. Scholars have often identified the interventions in the Greek War of Independence (1821-1829) as the first humanitarian intervention. Humanitarian concern was apparent when Britain, France and Russia decisively intervened in a naval engagement at Navarino in 1827 to secure for the Greeks independence from the Ottoman Empire. Popular opinion in England was sympathetic to the Greeks (philhellenism), in part due to the Greek origin of the West's classical heritage. The renowned poet Lord Byron even took up arms to join the Greek revolutionaries, while the London Philhellenic Committee was established to aid the Greek insurgents financially.

In 1823, after initial ambivalence, the Foreign Secretary George Canning declared that "when a whole nation revolts against its conqueror, the nation cannot be considered as piratical but as a nation in a state of war". In February that same year, he notified the Ottoman Empire that the United Kingdom would maintain friendly relations with the Turks only under the condition that the latter respected the Christian subjects of the Empire. He was also instrumental in the outcome of the St. Petersburg Protocol 1826, in which Russia and Britain agreed to mediate between the Ottomans and the Greeks on the basis of complete autonomy of Greece under Turkish sovereignty. When this did not end the War, Canning negotiated a following treaty that ultimately led to the destruction of the Egyptian-Turkish fleet at the Battle of Navarino.

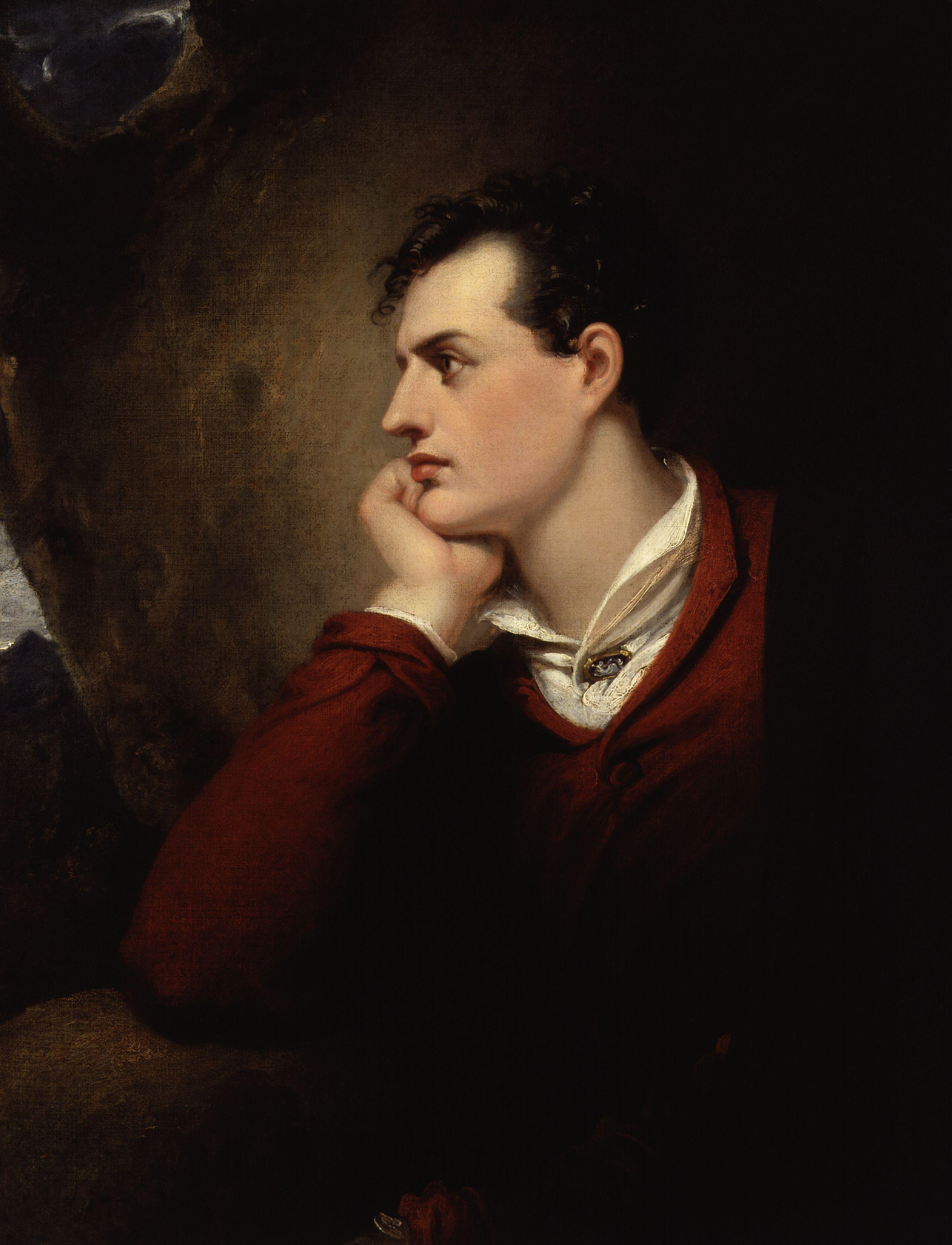
Poet Lord Byron, a Philhellene who fought for Greek independence

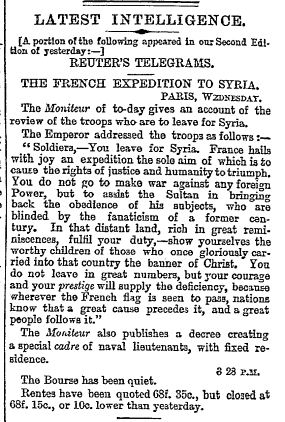
The 1860 French Expedition to intervene in the Druze–Maronite conflict was described by The Times as stemming from humanitarian motives.

The treatment of minorities under the Ottoman aegis proved a rich source of liberal agitation throughout the nineteenth century. A multinational force under French leadership was sent to Lebanon to help restore peace after the 1860 Druze–Maronite conflict, in which thousands of Christian Maronites had been massacred by the Druze population. Following an international outcry, the Ottoman Empire agreed on 3 August 1860 to the dispatch of up to 12,000 European soldiers to reestablish order. This agreement was further formalized in a convention on 5 September 1860 with Austria, Great Britain, France, Prussia and Russia.

In May 1876 Ottoman troops began massacring unarmed agitators for autonomy in Bulgaria, leading to the Eastern Crisis. The British launched a government investigation into the events, which confirmed that as part of an official policy, the Turks had killed at least 12,000 Bulgarians and obliterated about 60 villages. Lurid reports began to appear in newspapers, especially accounts by the investigative journalist William Thomas Stead in the Northern Echo, and protest meetings were called across the country.

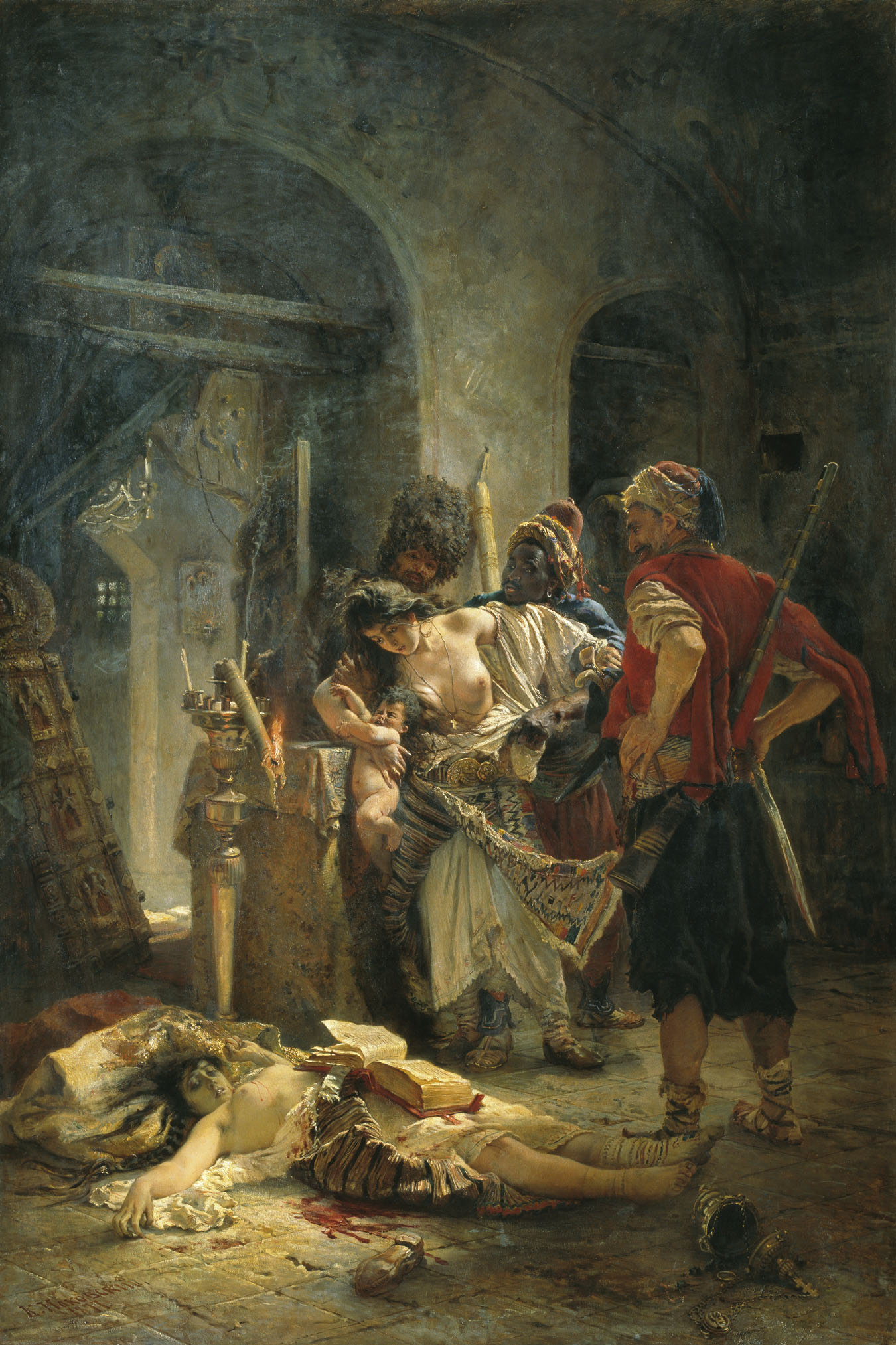
The Bulgarian Martyresses (1877), a painting by Konstantin Makovsky, which shocked Europe

Despite the unprecedented demonstration of the strength of public opinion and the media, the Prime Minister Benjamin Disraeli remained an unmoved practitioner of realpolitik, and considered British interests to lie in the preservation of Ottoman sovereignty in Eastern Europe. Lord Derby the Foreign Secretary disagreed and telegraphed the Sublime Porte that "any renewal of the outrages would be more fatal to the Porte than the loss of a battle." Apart from issuing stern advice and proposals for internal Turkish reform and the legal protection of minorities, the Disraeli government did nothing. However, the issue convulsed British politics with former Prime Minister William Ewart Gladstone coming out of retirement to campaign over the atrocities. In a famous campaigning speech he said:

Let the Turks now carry away their abuses, in the only possible manner, namely, by carrying off themselves. Their Zaptiehs and their Mudirs, their Blmhashis and Yuzbashis, their Kaimakams and their Pashas, one and all, bag and baggage, shall, I hope, clear out from the province that they have desolated and profaned. This thorough riddance, this most blessed deliverance, is the only reparation we can make to those heaps and heaps of dead, the violated purity alike of matron and of maiden and of child; to the civilization which has been affronted and shamed; to the laws of God, or, if you like, of Allah; to the moral sense of mankind at large.

Rising Great Power tensions in the early 20th century and the interwar period led to a breakdown in the concerted will of the international community to enforce considerations of a humanitarian nature. Attempts were made under the auspices of the League of Nations to arbitrate and settle international disputes. Aggressive actions, such as the Italian Invasion of Abyssinia and the Japanese occupation of Manchuria were condemned, but the League lacked the resolve to enforce its will effectively. The Allied discovery of the Holocaust and the subsequent Nuremberg trials at the end of World War II caused attitudes to change considerably. After the tragedies in Rwanda and the Balkans in the 1990s, the international community began to debate how to react to cases in which human rights are grossly and systematically violated. Especially, in his Millennium Report of 2000, then Secretary-General of the United Nations Kofi Annan, called on Member States: "If humanitarian intervention is indeed an unacceptable assault on sovereignty, how should we respond to a Rwanda, to a Srebrenica, to gross and systematic violations of human rights that offend every precept of our common humanity?". Since the end of the Cold War, interventions have increasingly been used, such as the NATO bombing of Yugoslavia and the 2011 military intervention in Libya.

=== Philosophy of humanitarian intervention ===
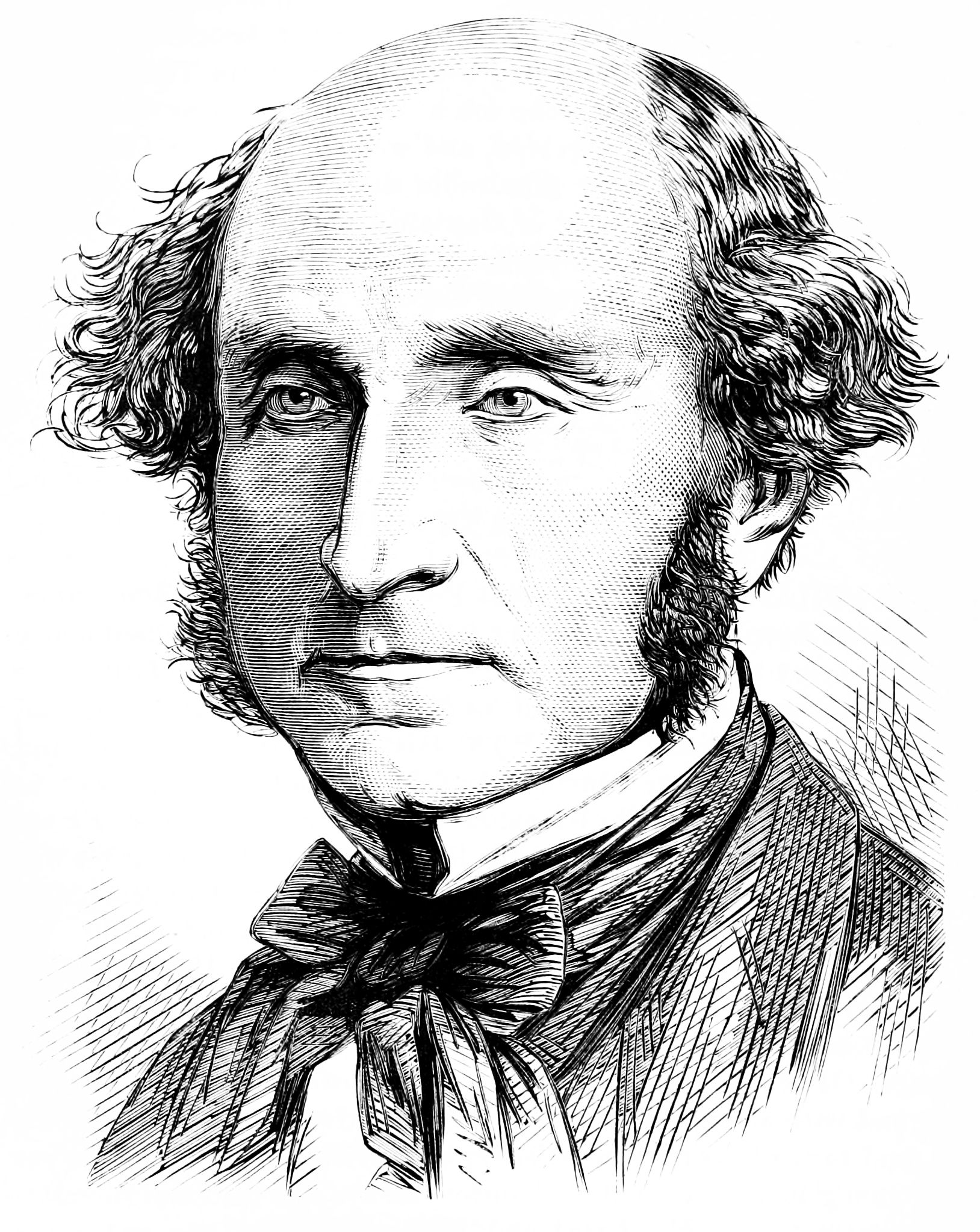
John Stuart Mill, an early proponent of humanitarian intervention

One of the first champions of the duty of humanitarian intervention to prevent atrocities around the world, was the Victorian liberal John Stuart Mill, who wrote in his 1859 essay A Few Words on Non-Intervention:

"There seems to be no little need that the whole doctrine of non-interference with foreign nations should be reconsidered, if it can be said to have as yet been considered as a really moral question at all... To go to war for an idea, if the war is aggressive, not defensive, is as criminal as to go to war for territory or revenue; for it is as little justifiable to force our ideas on other people, as to compel them to submit to our will in any other respect. But there assuredly are cases in which it is allowable to go to war, without having been ourselves attacked, or threatened with attack; and it is very important that nations should make up their minds in time, as to what these cases are... To suppose that the same international customs, and the same rules of international morality, can obtain between one civilized nation and another, and between civilized nations and barbarians, is a grave error...."

In 1859, Mill wrote that both Algeria and India (both of which were under European colonial rule) were inhabited by "barbarous peoples". Mill's justification of intervention was overt imperialism. First, he argued that with "barbarians" there is no hope for "reciprocity", an international fundamental. Second, barbarians are apt to benefit from civilized interveners, said Mill, citing Roman conquests of Gaul, Spain, Numidia and Dacia. Barbarians,

"have no rights as a nation, except a right to such treatment as may, at the earliest possible period, fit them for becoming one. The only moral laws for the relation between a civilized and a barbarous government, are the universal rules of morality between man and man."

While seeming wildly out of kilter with modern discourse, a similar approach can be found in theory on intervention in failed states. Of more widespread relevance, Mill discussed the position between "civilized peoples".

"The disputed question is that of interfering in the regulation of another country's internal concerns; the question whether a nation is justified in taking part, on either side, in the civil wars or party contests of another: and chiefly, whether it may justifiably aid the people of another country in struggling for liberty; or may impose on a country any particular government or institutions, either as being best for the country itself, or as necessary for the security of its neighbours.

Mill brushes over the situation of intervening on the side of governments who are trying to oppress an uprising of their own, saying "government which needs foreign support to enforce obedience from its own citizens, is one which ought not to exist". In the case however of a civil war, where both parties seem at fault, Mill argues that third parties are entitled to demand that the conflicts shall cease. He then moves to the more contentious situation of wars for liberation.

"When the contest is only with native rulers, and with such native strength as those rulers can enlist in their defence, the answer I should give to the question of the legitimacy of intervention is, as a general rule, No. The reason is, that there can seldom be anything approaching to assurance that intervention, even if successful, would be for the good of the people themselves. The only test possessing any real value, of a people's having become fit for popular institutions, is that they, or a sufficient portion of them to prevail in the contest, are willing to brave labour and danger for their liberation. I know all that may be said, I know it may be urged that the virtues of freemen cannot be learnt in the school of slavery, and that if a people are not fit for freedom, to have any chance of becoming so they must first be free. And this would be conclusive, if the intervention recommended would really give them freedom. But the evil is, that if they have not sufficient love of liberty to be able to wrest it from merely domestic oppressors, the liberty which is bestowed on them by other hands than their own, will have nothing real, nothing permanent. No people ever was and remained free, but because it was determined to be so...."

Mill's argument for humanitarian intervention, however, is not compatible with modern international law. International law after World War II establishes the principle of sovereign equality, and therefore to subject a sovereign state to outside intervention is generally considered illegal. To deal with this potential conflict between humanitarian intervention and the international legal system, there are some philosophical attempts to conciliate the two concepts and specify conditions for ethically justified interventions. John Rawls, one of the most influential political philosophers of the twentieth century, offers his theory of humanitarian intervention based on the notion of "well-ordered society." According to Rawls, a well-ordered society should be peaceful and legitimate, and it must respect basic human rights. Between such well-ordered societies, the principle of non-intervention should uphold. On the other hand, expansionist or human rights violating regimes are not shielded from the international law: in grave cases such as ethnic cleansing, coercive intervention by others is legitimate.

Martha Nussbaum, however, is critical of Rawls' approach. She points out that the sufferings of individuals, not those of the impersonal states, form the moral foundations of humanitarian intervention. Therefore, the concept of "well-ordered society," by falsely focusing on the state rather than individuals, cannot determine whether an intervention is justified. Instead, Nussbaum proposes a more concrete standard based on human capabilities (see Capability approach). She argues that "[n]ational sovereignty should be respected, within the constraints of promoting human capabilities". In other words, if a state fails to provide its citizens the basic "capabilities," such as the capability to live a healthy life, then outside intervention is justified.

Some critics contend that modern philosophical arguments for humanitarian aid fail to recognize the flaws of current international law itself. International Relations scholar Martha Finnemore argues that humanitarian crises often involve conflict between the most basic principles of international law: sovereignty, human rights and self-determination. As a result, philosophical attempts to integrate all those principles into a clear ethical guideline of humanitarian intervention is deemed to be futile. Legal scholar Eric Posner also points out that countries tend to hold different views of human rights and public good, so to establish a relatively simple set of rules that reflects shared ethics is not likely to succeed.

The debate about whether humanitarian intervention can be seen as a righteous and justified act, depends largely on which one of the variety of theories we decide to examine the concept through. In the school of international relations, we can analyse humanitarian intervention from the perspectives of for example realist, constructivist, liberalist, and idealist theories. When it comes to realist theory, humanitarian intervention can never be purely humanitarian since the main actors are states who act out of their own interests. In addition, realists highlight that the decisions whether to intervene or not are made by political decision makers who all have their own reasons behind the willingness to intervene or not intervene. Similarly, some realists argue that humanitarianism should not be treated as a separate category in a state's behavior. One of the problems in this approach is that it might lead to lack of intervention, unless states see a material interest in it. Realist theory thus precludes moral action unless it is in line with state interests. According to constructivist theorists, a state's self-interest is also defined by its identity as well as shared values and principles, which include promotion of democracy, freedom and human rights. Therefore, if we expect that these values are morally valuable, intervention which is self-interested in the above-mentioned sense might not be morally problematic. Moreover, they emphasize that morals and self interests are not mutually exclusive. For certain constructivists it's also important that the intervener is seen as legitimate on a global level, in order to not meet pressure that would prevent its success. Liberalism can be perceived as one of humanitarian intervention's ethical sources, which challenges the norms and methods of sovereign states’ governance together with its existence in the case where one of many nationalities experience oppression. Certain liberalists even value national self-determination higher than an individual's right to democratic government, refusing the ethical origin of an intervention when only democracy is at risk. One strain of liberalism in this context is forceful liberalism, which perceives sovereignty as only an instrumental value. Forceful liberalists highlight the human rights defense through intervention both with the consent from the Security Council or without it. For them, the lack of intervention to the Rwandan genocide in 1994 was more grave than not intervening because of lack of authorisation. At the other end there is idealist theory, according to which all individuals are connected through shared values, rights, duties and universal norms. Since the world is seen as a big community, everyone is connected through a common humanitarian law, thus making intervention a responsibility rather than a violation against state sovereignty. Human rights violations happening in one part of the world would therefore affect everyone equally. However, idealism is often seen as too simplified and narrow since it claims that intervention has to follow purely altruistic motives where people selflessly want to help other individuals regardless of their race, religion or nationality.

== Legal grounds ==
Humanitarian intervention is a concept that can allow the use of force in a situation when the UN Security Council cannot pass a resolution under Chapter VII of the Charter of the United Nations due to veto by a permanent member or due to not achieving 9 affirmative votes. Chapter VII allows the Security Council to take action in situations where there is a "threat to the peace, breach of the peace or act of aggression". However, any resolution to that effect must be supported by all five permanent members (or at least not vetoed by one of them). The reference to the "right" of humanitarian intervention was, in the post Cold-War context, for the first time invoked in 1990 by the UK delegation after Russia and China had failed to support a no-fly zone over Iraq. Therefore, in addition to humanitarian objectives the concept is designed to circumvent the UN Security Council by invoking a right. However, critics base their arguments on the Westphalian conception of international law according to which the rights of sovereign nations to act freely within their own borders. This is upheld in the UN Charter of 1945, where in article 2(7) it is stated that "nothing should authorize intervention in matters essentially within the domestic jurisdiction of any state." Thus, because both proponents and opponents of humanitarian intervention have their legal grounds on the charter of the United Nations, there is still an ongoing controversy as to whether sovereignty or humanitarian causes should prevail. The United Nations has also continuously been involved with issues related to humanitarian intervention, with the UN intervening in an increased number of conflicts within the borders of nations.

== Current approaches to humanitarian intervention ==
Although most writers agree that humanitarian interventions should be undertaken multilaterally, ambiguity remains over which particular agents – the UN, regional organizations, or a group of states – should act in response to mass violations of human rights. The choice of actor has implications for overcoming collective action challenges through mobilization of political will and material resources. Questions of effectiveness, conduct and motives of the intervener, extent of internal and external support, and legal authorization have also been raised as possible criteria for evaluating the legitimacy of a potential intervener.

=== Pragmatic humanitarian intervention ===
The most well-known standard for humanitarian intervention after World War II has been genocide. According to, the 1948 Convention on the Prevention and Punishment of Genocide, the term was defined as acts “committed with the intent to destroy, in whole or in part, a national ethnic, racial, or religious group.” However, the norm has been challenged. Because there is a high possibility that if the international community applies the genocide standard to undertake humanitarian intervention, it would have been too late to make a meaningful intervention which should have prevented mass homicide in the concerned country.

These two well-known standards for humanitarian intervention do not resolve the states’ trade-offs between moral responsibilities and potential costs. Furthermore, intervention without a viable plan and workable strategy could threaten the states’ obligation to their own people. It should also be considered, that sometimes humanitarian intervention only results in open-ended chaos in the country without meaningful progress.

=== Authorized interventions ===
The understanding of what constitutes threats to international peace has been radically broadened since the 1990s to include such issues as mass displacement, and the UN Security Council has authorized use of force in situations that many states would have previously viewed as "internal" conflicts.

=== Unauthorized interventions ===
In several instances states or groups of states have intervened with force, and without advanced authorization from the UN Security Council, at least in part in response to alleged extreme violations of basic human rights. Fairly recent examples include the intervention after the Gulf War to protect the Kurds in northern Iraq as well as NATO's intervention in Kosovo.

Four distinct attitudes or approaches to the legitimacy of humanitarian intervention in the absence of Security Council authorizations can be identified:

1. Status quo: Categorically affirms that military intervention in response to atrocities is lawful only if authorized by the UN Security Council or if it qualifies as an exercise in the right of self-defense. Under this view, NATO's intervention in Kosovo constituted a clear violation of Article 2(4). Defenders of this position include a number of states, most notably Russia and the People's Republic of China. Proponents of this approach point to the literal text of the UN Charter, and stress that the high threshold for authorization of the use of force aims to minimize its use, and promote consensus as well as stability by ensuring a basic acceptance of military action by key states. However, Kosovo war has also highlighted the drawbacks of this approach, most notably when effective and consistent humanitarian intervention is made unlikely by the geopolitical realities of relations between the Permanent Five members of the Security Council, leading to the use of the veto and inconsistent action in the face of a humanitarian crises.
2. Excusable breach: Humanitarian intervention without a UN mandate is technically illegal under the rules of the UN Charter, but may be morally and politically justified in certain exceptional cases. Benefits of this approach include that it contemplates no new legal rules governing the use of force, but rather opens an "emergency exit" when there is a tension between the rules governing the use of force and the protection of fundamental human rights. Intervening states are unlikely to be condemned as law-breakers, although they take a risk of violating rules for a purportedly higher purpose. However, in practice, this could lead to questioning the legitimacy of the legal rules themselves if they are unable to justify actions the majority of the UN Security Council views as morally and politically unjustified.
3. Customary law: This approach involves reviewing the evolution of customary law for a legal justification of non-authorized humanitarian intervention in rare cases. This approach asks whether an emerging norm of customary law can be identified under which humanitarian intervention can be understood not only as ethically and politically justified but also as legal under the normative framework governing the use of force. However, relatively few cases exist to provide justification for the emergence of a norm, and under this approach ambiguities and differences of view about the legality of an intervention may deter states from acting. The potential for an erosion of rules governing the use of force may also be a point of concern.
4. Codification: The fourth approach calls for the codification of a clear legal doctrine or "right" of intervention, arguing that such a doctrine could be established through some formal or codified means such as a UN Charter Amendment or UN General Assembly declaration. Although states have been reluctant to advocate this approach, a number of scholars, as well as the Independent International Commission on Kosovo, have made the case for establishing such a right or doctrine with specified criteria to guide assessments of legality. A major argument advanced for codifying this right is that it would enhance the legitimacy of international law, and resolve the tension between human rights and sovereignty principles contained in the UN charter. However, the historical record on humanitarian intervention is sufficiently ambiguous that it argues for humility regarding efforts to specify in advance the circumstances in which states can use force, without Security Council authorizations, against other states to protect human rights.

=== Responsibility to protect ===
Although usually considered to be categorically distinct from most definitions of humanitarian intervention, the emergence of a 'Responsibility to protect' (R2P) deserves mention. Responsibility to Protect is the name of a report produced in 2001 by the International Commission on Intervention and State Sovereignty (ICISS) which was established by the Canadian government in response to Kofi Annan's question of when the international community must intervene for humanitarian purposes. The Canadian government's report, "The Responsibility to Protect," found that the sovereignty not only gave a State the right to "control" its affairs, it also conferred on the State primary "responsibility" for protecting the people within its borders. Also, the report proposed that when a State fails to protect its people – either through lack of ability or a lack of willingness – the responsibility shifts to the broader international community. The report sought to establish a set of clear guidelines for determining when intervention is appropriate, what the appropriate channels for approving an intervention are and how the intervention itself should be carried out.

Responsibility to protect seeks to establish a clearer code of conduct for humanitarian interventions and also advocates a greater reliance on non-military measures. The report also criticises and attempts to change the discourse and terminology surrounding the issue of humanitarian intervention. It argues that the notion of a 'right to intervene' is problematic and should be replaced with the 'responsibility to protect'. Under Responsibility to Protect doctrine, rather than having a right to intervene in the conduct of other states, states are said to have a responsibility to intervene and protect the citizens of another state where that other state has failed in its obligation to protect its own citizens.

This responsibility is said to involve three stages: to prevent, to react and to rebuild. Responsibility to Protect has gained strong support in some circles, such as in Canada, a handful of European and African nations, and among proponents of human security, but has been criticised by others, with some Asian nations being among the chief dissenters. Some scholars have written of "Northern" and "Southern" interpretations of the concept.

== Humanitarian intervention in foreign policy doctrines ==
See:

- Clinton Doctrine
- Blair Doctrine
- Obama Doctrine
- Donroe Doctrine

== Examples of military humanitarian intervention ==
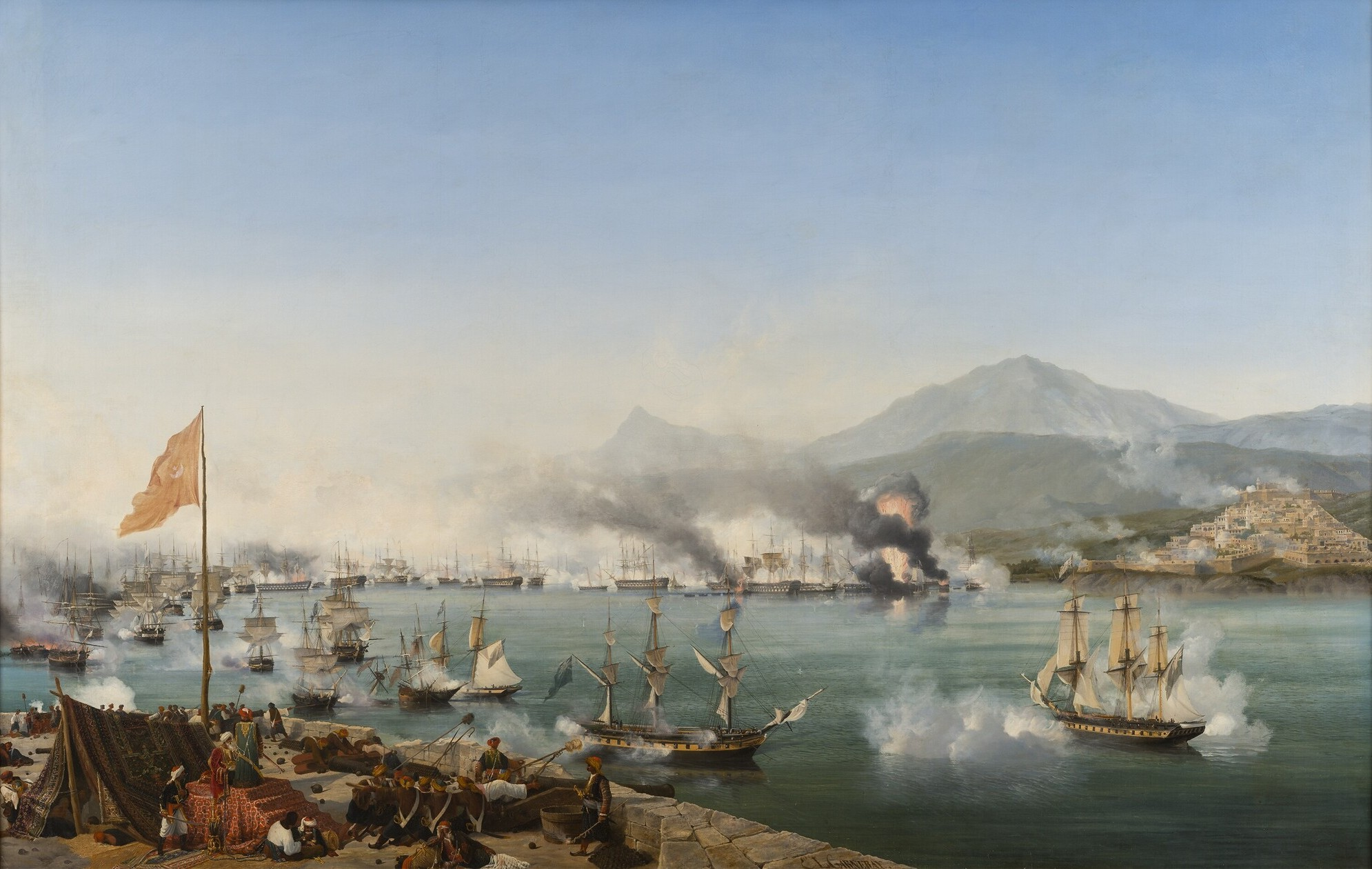
The Battle of Navarino, in October 1827, marked the effective end of Ottoman rule in Greece.

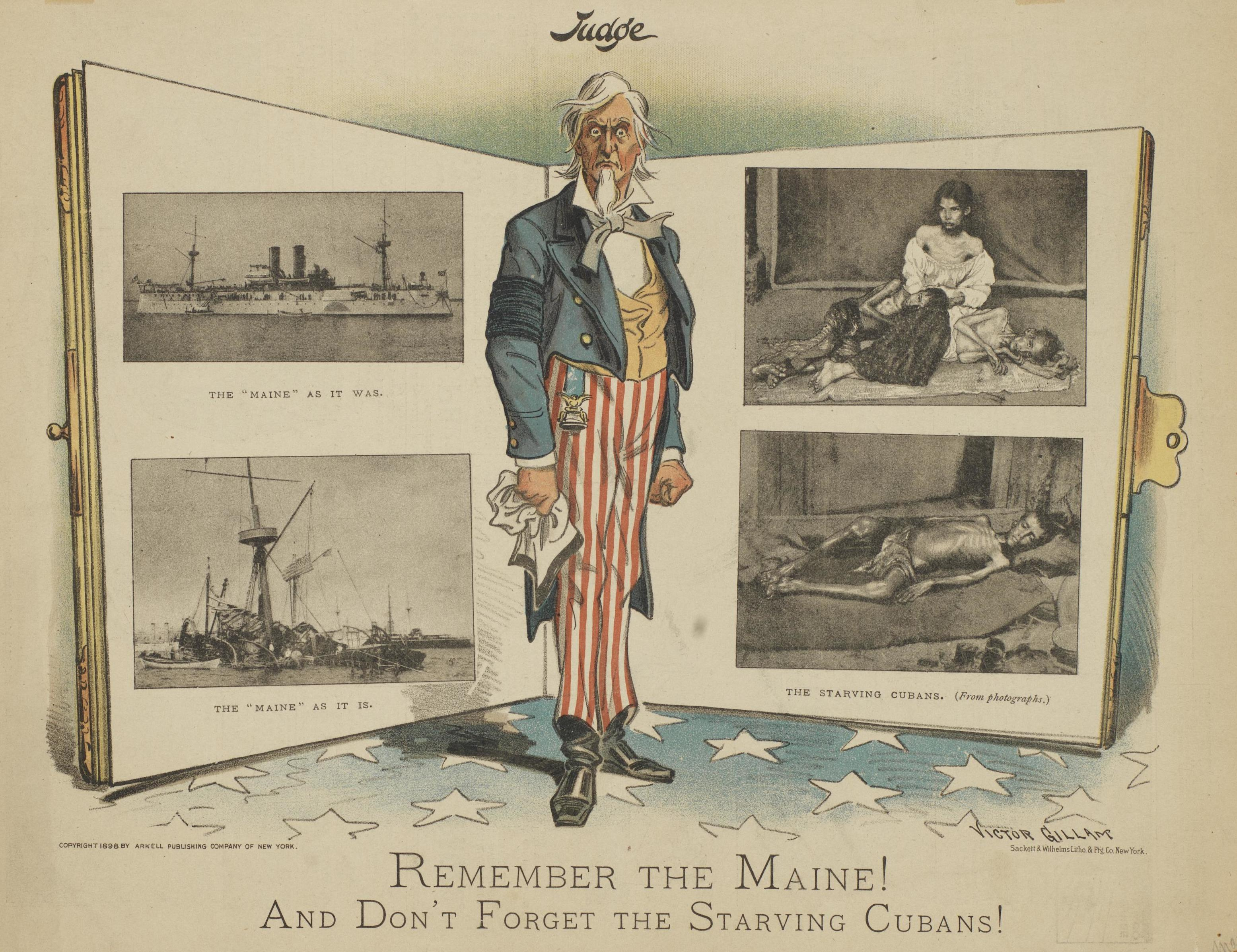
American cartoon, published in 1898: "Remember the Maine! And Don't Forget the Starving Cubans!"

Potential examples of previous humanitarian interventions include:

- Bombardment of Algiers (1816)
- Russian, British and French Anti-Ottoman Intervention in the Greek War of Independence (1824)
- French expedition in Syria (1860–1861)
- Russian Anti-Ottoman Intervention in Bulgaria (1877)
- Spanish–American War (1898)
- United States occupation of Haiti (1915)
- United Nations Operation in the Congo (1964)
- US intervention in Dominican Republic (1965)
- Indian intervention in East Pakistan (1971)
- Vietnamese Intervention in Cambodia (1978)
- Uganda-Tanzania War (1979)
- Operation Provide Comfort (Iraq, 1991)
- Unified Task Force (Somalia, 1992)
- Operation Uphold Democracy (Haiti, 1994)
- UNAMIR (Rwanda, 1994)
- UNTAET (East Timor, 1999)
- NATO bombing of Yugoslavia (1999)
- British military intervention in the Sierra Leone Civil War (2000)
- Coalition military intervention in Libya (2011)
- Military intervention against the Islamic State of Iraq and the Levant (2014–present)
- Shipping of humanitarian aid to Venezuela (2019)

Some academics have referred to these cases as humanitarian interventions. However, in some cases this is only a retrospective classification of actions that were the result of a variety of motivations. Vietnam's invasion of Cambodia for instance, was justified as self-defense rather than humanitarianism and has only later come to be seen as a possible example of humanitarian intervention.

== Proponents ==
In “Can Intervention Work?” Rory Stewart, a British diplomat and politician, and Gerald Knaus, a professor and author, argue that in certain circumstances limited, but resourced interventions for a humanitarian mission can succeed. The authors co-wrote an introduction at a moment when the international communality was debating whether and how to intervene in Libya, and highlight the West's history of imperfect interventions. They quote Anthony Lake's policy, “to help other nation's build themselves” as a guiding principal in foreign intervention. The authors are critical of the RAND Corporation report Beginner's Guide to Nation-Building and argue every intervention situation is different based on the local political economy and there is not one universal approach that always works. The rest of the book is divided into two sections: first, Stewart reviews the international experience in Afghanistan since 9/11 based on his experience and travel in the country, and second, Knaus provides a case study on the international intervention in Bosnia. Overall, the authors warn against “over-interventions” such as Iraq that were based on “exaggerated fears" and “irrational confidence” and often ignored “local tradition, identity, and history.” Stewart and Knaus advocate an intervention policy based on ““principled incrementalism” that invest time and resources in understanding local context and defining concrete goals.

== Views held by states ==
The doctrine of humanitarian interventions has not been generally accepted. In April 2000, the 133 states forming the Group of 77 + China explicitly rejected "the so-called 'right' of humanitarian intervention, which has no legal basis in the United Nations Charter or in the general principles of international law". This far, only the United Kingdom and Belgium explicitly defended the legality of humanitarian interventions.

== Criticism ==
Many criticisms have been levied against humanitarian intervention. Inter-governmental bodies and commission reports composed by persons associated with governmental and international careers have rarely discussed the distorting selectivity of geopolitics behind humanitarian intervention nor potential hidden motivations of intervening parties. To find less veiled criticism one must usually turn to civil society perspectives, especially those shaped by independent scholars who benefit from academic freedom.

Some argue that humanitarian intervention is a modern manifestation of the Western colonialism of the 19th century; the subjects of such intervention are ruled not by one sole party or entity, but by a mix of local institutions, NGOs and the interveners themselves. Anne Orford's work is a major contribution along these lines, demonstrating the extent to which the perils of the present for societies experiencing humanitarian catastrophes are directly attributable to the legacy of colonial rule. In the name of reconstruction, a capitalist set of constraints is imposed on a broken society that impairs its right of self-determination and prevents its leadership from adopting an approach to development that benefits the people of the country rather than makes foreign investors happy. The essence of her position is that "legal narratives" justifying humanitarian intervention have had the primary effect of sustaining "an unjust and exploitative status quo".

Others argue that dominant countries, especially the United States and its coalition partners, are using humanitarian pretexts to pursue otherwise unacceptable geopolitical goals and to evade the non-intervention norm and legal prohibitions on the use of international force. Noam Chomsky and Tariq Ali are at the forefront of this camp, viewing professions of humanitarian motivation with deep skepticism. They argue that the United States has continued to act with its own interests in mind, with the only change being that humanitarianism has become a legitimizing ideology for projection of U.S. hegemony in a post–Cold War world. Ali in particular argues that NATO intervention in Kosovo was conducted largely to boost NATO's credibility. Chomsky's expression of "our excess of righteousness and disinterested benevolence" is often used to describe Kennedy's intervention in South Vietnam, which spread to all of Indochina. Furthermore, he asserts that the prospective leader of "humanitarian intervention" must uphold several qualifications. A first qualification is that the leader has to work as a moral agent that does not magnify the danger of elite culture, the efficacy of the intervention should be on the targeted population, and the people must be the moral agents that undertake humanitarian efforts.

A third type of criticism centers on the event-based and inconsistent nature of most policies on humanitarian intervention. These critics argue that there is a tendency for the concept to be invoked in the heat of action, giving the appearance of propriety for Western television viewers, but that it neglects the conflicts that are forgotten by the media or occur based on chronic distresses rather than sudden crises. Henry Kissinger, for example, finds that Bill Clinton's practice of humanitarian intervention was wildly inconsistent. The US launched two military campaigns against Serbia while ignoring more widespread slaughter in Rwanda, justifying the Russian assault on Chechnya, and welcoming to the United States the second-ranking military official of a widely recognized severe human rights violator – the government of North Korea.

Further, skeptics have also argued that humanitarian intervention may have perverse consequences. Castan Pinos claims that "humanitarian" interventions generate a multiplicity of collateral effects, including civilian deaths, conflict-aggravation, violence spill-over into neighbouring regions and mutual distrust between great powers.

Jeremy Weinstein, a political scientist at Stanford University, has argued for "autonomous recovery": although the number of civilian deaths rises when violence between rebel groups is left unchecked, the eventual victors can develop institutions and set the terms of their rule in a self-enforcing manner. Such self-enforcement reduces the risk of a country slipping back into violence.

Another criticism argues that humanitarian intervention has historically consisted of primarily actions directed by so-called Northern states within the internal affairs of so-called Southern states, and has also led to criticism from many non-Western states. These critics argue that the norm of non-intervention and the primacy of sovereign equality is something still cherished by the vast majority of states, which see humanitarian intervention not as a growing awareness of human rights, but a regression to the selective adherence to sovereignty of the pre–UN Charter world. During the Havana G-77 summit in 2000, the "so-called right of humanitarian intervention" as it was described, was condemned as having no basis in international law. Furthermore, in his criticism, Chomsky writes that "Humanitarian interventionism goes only one way"from the powerful to the weak", and condemns what he called the targeting of the concept of national sovereignty by humanitarian interventionists, arguing that the primary purpose of national sovereignty is to give weak states partial protection against strong states, and that the protection of national sovereignty under international law stops internal conflicts in weak countries being exploited by strong ones.

== See also ==
- Hard Choices: Moral Dilemmas in Humanitarian Intervention – 1998 non-fiction compilation book edited by Jonathan Moore
- Humanitarian aid – Material or logistical assistance for people in need
- Human security – People-centric approach to national security
- Imperialism – Extension of rule over foreign nations
- Independent International Commission on Kosovo
- Intervention (international law) – Use of force by one state to interfere in the affairs of another
- Interventionism (politics) – Interference by one country in the affairs of another
- Just war theory – Doctrine about when a war is ethically just
- Mogadishu Line – Proposed distinction between military operations
- Nation state – Political term for a state that is based around a nation
- Peacekeeping – Activities intended to create conditions that favour lasting peace
- Police action – Military action undertaken without a declaration of war
- Responsibility to protect – 2005 UN global political commitment
- United Nations Security Council – Organ of the UN responsible for the maintenance of international peace and security
- Use of force in international law – Military intervention
- White Man's Burden – Poem by the English poet Rudyard Kipling
