= Andrew Bickford =

Royal Navy officer (1844–1927)

Admiral Andrew Bickford CMG
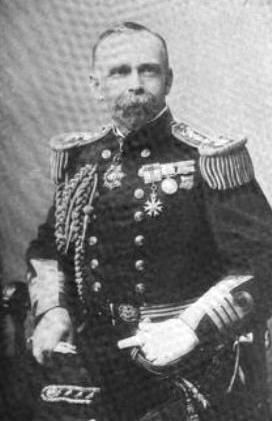
- In The Sketch, 31 October 1900
- Born: 16 July 1844; Madras, India
- Died: 9 October 1927 (aged 83); Hove, England
- Military career
- Allegiance: United Kingdom
- Branch: Royal Navy
- Rank: Admiral
- Commands: HMS Thalia; Pacific Station
- Conflicts: Anglo-Egyptian War
- Awards: Companion of the Order of St Michael and St George

Admiral Andrew Kennedy Bickford CMG (16 July 1844 – 9 October 1927) was a Royal Navy officer who went on to be Commander-in-Chief, Pacific Station.

== Early life ==
Bickford was educated at the South Devon Collegiate School and Stubbington House School.

== Naval career ==
Bickford joined the Royal Navy in 1858 and took part in the action involving the Huáscar in 1877. He commanded HMS Thalia during the Anglo-Egyptian War of 1882, was promoted to captain in 1884, and was appointed a Companion of the Order of St Michael and St George (CMG) in 1885 for "special services in connection with the release of the crew of the Nisero". He became Commander-in-Chief, Pacific Station in 1900. His flagship in the Pacific was HMS Warspite until March 1902, when he hoisted his flag on board the first class cruiser HMS Grafton, and Warspite returned home. Promoted to vice admiral in 1904 and to full Admiral in 1908, he retired later that year.

== Legacy ==
The Bickford Tower erected at Esquimalt, British Columbia for signalling purposes in 1901 is named after him.

== Family ==
Bickford married Kathleen Dore on 16 April 1868 in the parish church of Queenstown (Cobh). She was the daughter of Dr. Patrick Dore of Skibbereen who had died in 1847 from lung inflammation during the Irish famine. The mortality rate amongst physicians in Ireland at this time was in the order of 25%, due to the outbreak of deadly infectious diseases contracted by many of the weakened famine victims. Kathleen's mother, Catherine Power, was the sister of Maurice Power, Member of Parliament for Cork 1847–1852.

Bickford died at his home in Hove on 9 October 1927.

Military offices
| Preceded by Lewis Beaumont | Commander-in-Chief, Pacific Station; 1900 – 1903 | Succeeded by James Goodrich as Commodore Commanding, Pacific Station |
