= David Pacifico =

Gibraltarian merchant (d. 1854)

David Pacifico, known as Don Pacifico (1784? – 12 April 1854), was a Portuguese Jewish merchant and diplomat. He was considered a British subject by birth and was the central victim in the Anglo–Greek dispute in 1850 known as the Don Pacifico Affair.

== Biography ==
=== Early life ===
Pacifico was a Sephardic Jew of Italian descent. Pacifico's grandfather, of the same name, was born in Italy eventually settled down in Gibraltar. His family had been expelled from Spain with the rest of the Jews in 1492. His ancestors reached Italy, particularly Tuscany, first Leghorn and then Florence. As Pacifico grew up in Portugal because of his father's work, he was speaking fluent Portuguese. That led to the myth of Portuguese descent for the Pacificos, who were actually of Spanish descent.

Pacifico's parents were married in Bevis Marks Synagogue in London in 1761. He gave varying accounts of his birth, placing it either in Oran, which belonged to Spain at the time, or in Gibraltar, which was a British possession. He once claimed to be a Spanish subject.

A liberal living in Portugal during the Civil War of 1828–34, he was persecuted by the Miguelists. In 1835, after the war, he was rewarded by the victorious liberals with a consulship in Morocco and Portuguese citizenship. From 1837 to 1842, he served as consul-general in Athens, during which time he also engaged in commerce and became prominent in the local Jewish community.

=== Greece ===
Pacifico continued residing in Greece after he was stripped of his position for repeatedly overstepping his authority in 1842. In April 1847, in order not to offend a visiting French Jewish financier, a member of the Rothschild family, the government banned the traditional burning of Judas Iscariot in effigy during Greek Orthodox Easter celebrations. An angry mob sacked Pacifico's house as police looked on. Pacifico then enlisted the aid of the British legation in claiming £32,000 in compensation from the Greek government for damage to his property, plus 10% interest and £500 for physical violence against Pacifico himself. The claim was approved by Lord Palmerston, then Secretary of State for Foreign Affairs. He also claimed compensation for land of his that had been acquired by the state. While this latter claim was accepted, the Greek government ignored his claims relating to the riot. The affair came to a head in January 1850, when the Royal Navy blockaded Athens to force Greece to settle Pacifico's claims and others'. Through French and Russian intervention, his claims were reduced, the blockade lifted and Greece agreed to pay.

=== London ===
The Don Pacifico affair provoked a debate in Parliament. Palmerston justified his actions in a speech to the house on 25 June 1850, using the phrase, Civis romanus sum, translated as "I am a Roman citizen", the declaration by a Roman to protect him from harm anywhere in the Roman Empire. He railed against the anti-Semitic prejudice that "because a man is of the Jewish persuasion, he is fair game for any outrage." In a vote on an opposition motion, the right of a British subject to appeal for aid anywhere in the world was affirmed by the house with a majority of forty-six.

Despite his international prominence, Pacifico was unpopular with London's Jews. He died at 15 Bury Street in London on 12 April 1854 and was buried two days later at the Spanish and Portuguese Jews' cemetery at Mile End Road. In an obituary published 21 April, The Jewish Chronicle called him an "individual who … caused so much sensation in the political world."

== See also ==
- List of Gibraltarians
