= Don Pacifico affair =

1850 international incident concerning Greece, the UK and Portugal

The Don Pacifico affair was a diplomatic episode which occurred in 1850 and concerned the governments of Greece, the United Kingdom and Portugal, and is considered an example of gunboat diplomacy. The affair is named after David Pacifico, a Jewish British subject born in Gibraltar. He had previously been Portuguese consul-general to Greece, dismissed from his consulship for exceeding his authority repeatedly during 1842, but he continued to reside in Athens.

The dispute began in 1847 after Pacifico's house was attacked and vandalised by a mob that included the sons of a government minister, while police, according to Pacifico's claims, watched and neglected to intervene.

== Immediate antagonism ==
James Mayer de Rothschild had been visiting Athens in 1847 during the Greek Orthodox Easter (which was on 4 April) to discuss a possible loan, and the city government decided to ban the traditional custom of burning the effigy of Judas, thinking that Rothschild might be offended by the tradition. As James Brown Scott reports it:

It appears that it was then the custom at Athens to burn on Easter Sunday the image of Judas Iscariot. As, however, Lord Rothschild, a British subject of Jewish faith, was visiting Athens at this time, the Greek government forbade the custom. This was attributed by the populace, not to the presence of Lord Rothschild, but to the influence of Don Pacifico. Hence the outrages to his person and property.

Some of the Greek population in Athens, angered at the cancellation of their customs, rioted before the house of the Portuguese Consul-General. It was claimed by Pacifico that the crowd was infiltrated by the Greek police, and that among its inciters was one or more sons of the Greek Minister of War.

Three days after the incident, Don Pacifico himself wrote to Sir Edmund Lyons, British Minister Plenipotentiary to Greece:

It is with much grief that I feel myself obliged to communicate to your Excellency a dreadful event which has happened to me, and as an English subject to beg your protection. Last Sunday, Easter-day, at about 12 o'clock, a crowd of people, amongst whom were some soldiers of the gendarmerie, just come out of church, presented themselves at the door of my house, which they very soon battered down with large pieces of stone. These brigands, in number about 300 or 400, entered my house, and swearing dreadfully, began beating my wife, my innocent children, and my son-in-law. After having broken the windows, doors, tables, chairs, and every other article of furniture, they robbed me of my jewels, forcing open the closets in which were vases, candlesticks, gold and silver ornaments, diamonds, and lastly a box containing money to the amount of 9,800 drachmas, of which 2,300 were my own private property, and 7,500 which had been deposited with me by the Jewish community of Italy for the projected erection of a temple, and for the poor of this kingdom. These barbarians did not even leave me the Consular Portuguese archives, which were torn by them to pieces. These papers being my security from that nation for the sum of 21,295 l. 1s. 4d. sterling.

It is clear that Don Pacifico was a man of many activities. He had been the Portuguese Consul-General in Athens until 1842, and had possession of the Legation's archive. He had previously been Portuguese Consul-General in Morocco. He was also concerned actively with the Jewish community in Athens, in possession of money intended for the construction of a synagogue in Athens. His house was not, as alleged by his defenders, a poor hovel, but the very house in which the chief of the Regency Council of King Otto, Count Josef Ludwig von Armansperg, had lived during the Regency (1832–1835) and as Arch-Secretary to the King (1835–1837).

On 20 May 1847, Lyons informed the Foreign Office in London that he had applied to the Greek Government for compensation for Don David Pacifico, a British subject, for loss of possessions, including documents relating to a substantial claim against the Portuguese government for monies owed. The British Foreign Secretary Lord Palmerston, a philhellene and supporter of the Greek War of Independence of 1821–1829, advised Lyons to have Pacifico compile an itemized valuation of his losses, and, if his statement was proven by satisfactory evidence, to present a note to the Greek Minister of Foreign Affairs requiring him to direct that the sum be paid to Don Pacifico. Pacifico complied on 22 February 1848, and Lyons duly dispatched a demand for payment to M. Drossos Mansolas, the Greek Minister for Foreign Affairs. He also wrote to M. Constantine Colocotronis, the Prime Minister. Colocotronis rejected Pacifico's claims, with the same objections used by his predecessor in office, M. Colettis. The objections of the Greek government were that the claimed damages were impossibly great, with some estimates of the claimed sum as being larger than the value of the Greek Royal Palace, while the Greek government also considered this to be an affair of the Judiciary, not the Executive branch. On 31 August 1848, David Pacifico again wrote to Lyons, mentioning that sixteen months had passed since the incident and satisfaction had not been forthcoming. Moreover, he had been forced to abandon his house during the Easter celebrations of 1848; and he drew to the attention of Lyons that several years earlier two Jews had been massacred at Patras, and likewise the synagogue at Negroponte had been burned down. After additional exchanges of letters among all the parties, on 15 October 1848, Don David Pacifico appealed again to the British Government to obtain the settlement of his claims.

Already on 3 December 1849, Lord Palmerston had decided to take definitive action to counter Greek objections. Palmerston wrote to Sir Thomas Wyse, the British Minister in Athens,

I have desired the Admiralty to instruct Sir William Parker to take Athens on his way back from the Dardanelles, and to support you in bringing at last to a satisfactory ending the settlement of our various claims upon the Greek Government. You will, of course, in conjunction with him, persevere in the suaviter in modo as long as is consistent with our dignity and honour, and I measure that time by days – perhaps by some very small number of hours. If however, the Greek Government does not strike, Parker must do so. In that case you should embark on board his fleet before he begins to take any hostile steps, in order that you and your mission may be secure against insult. He should, of course, begin by reprisals; that is, by taking possession of some Greek property; but the King would probably not much care for our taking hold of any merchant property, and the best thing, therefore, would be to seize hold of his little fleet, if that can be done handily. The next thing would be a blockade of any or all of his ports....

On 22 January 1850, Admiral Sir William Parker reported that all the vessels of the Greek government had been detained, but that the machinations of the French Minister Thouvenot and the Prussian Chargé d'affaires were encouraging King Otto to resist. The Greek Government and the Greek people had been humiliated by the affair, and the British also attempted to push their desired outcomes on other disputes with the Greek government, especially pertaining to the United States of the Ionian Islands, such as:

- The British claims on the islands of Sapientza and Elafonisos for the United States of the Ionian Islands (then a British protectorate).
- Compensation for six British ships that were robbed.
- Placation for an insult to the British flag and disrespect towards the British Ambassador, Mr. Boyde.
- Compensation for two Ionian Islanders who had been abused in Pyrgos.
- Compensation for George Finlay's land, which had been included in the Royal Gardens of Athens without compensation.

Greece was a state protected jointly by the UK, France, and Russia, and the imposition of the blockade caused a diplomatic conflict between Britain, on the one hand, and France and Russia on the other. France and Russia objected to the blockade and the French Ambassador in London, Édouard Drouyn de Lhuys, was temporarily withdrawn by the French government, causing the British to abandon the push on disputes not directly associated with the Don Pacifico affair. The affair also caused considerable damage to the reputation of King Otto in Athens. The blockade lasted two months and the affair ended only when the Greek government agreed to compensate Pacifico.

== Political fallout in London ==
At Westminster, both houses of Parliament examined the issue of foreign policy, especially with regard to Greece, with considerable energy. On 17 June 1850, Lord Edward Stanley (the future Earl of Derby), the Leader of the Conservative Opposition in the House of Lords, proposed a motion in the House: "That, while the House fully recognizes the right and duty of the Government to secure to Her Majesty's subjects residing in foreign states the full protection of the laws of those states, it regrets to find, by the correspondence recently laid upon the table by Her Majesty's command, that various claims against the Greek government, doubtful in point of justice or exaggerated in amount, have been enforced by coercive measures directed against the commerce and people of Greece, and calculated to endanger the continuance of our friendly relations with other powers." After a memorable debate on 17 June 1850, the House of Lords voted in favour of the Opposition motion, by a majority of 37, which was a rebuke to Lord Palmerston's policies.

However, the House of Commons did not proceed as the Lords. The MP for Sheffield, John Arthur Roebuck, an independent and sometimes contrarian member, proposed to reverse this condemnation, by stating "That the principles on which the foreign policy of Her Majesty's Government have been regulated have been such as were calculated to maintain the honour and dignity of this country; and in times of unexampled difficulty, to preserve peace between England and the various nations of the world." A debate ensued, which lasted four nights. Palmerston delivered a famous five-hour speech in which he sought to vindicate not only his claims on the Greek government for Don Pacifico, but his entire administration of foreign affairs. "As the Roman, in days of old, held himself free from indignity, when he could say, Civis Romanus sum, so also a British subject, in whatever land he may be, shall feel confident that the watchful eye and the strong arm of England will protect him from injustice and wrong." He was answered by Sir Robert Peel, in what turned out to be his last speech to the Commons, and by W. E. Gladstone. The Government won the motion by 310 to 264, a majority of forty-six, in favour of Palmerston's conduct of foreign affairs.

== Pacifico's settlement ==
The claims of the British Government were settled by a Convention, agreed between Her Britannic Majesty and His Hellenic Majesty on 18 July 1850. The King agreed to make good to Pacifico any real injury which could be proved, after a full and fair investigation.

Don Pacifico's outstanding claims were submitted to a special Commission, composed of the French, British and Greek ministers in Lisbon. The Commissioners met in Lisbon in February 1851. The Commission discovered in the archives of the Cortes at Lisbon a petition addressed by Pacifico to the Cortes in 1839, accompanied by voluminous documents to prove his claims. The claims had yet to be addressed by the Cortes. The Commission awarded Pacifico the sum of £150, owed by the Greek Government. Pacifico received a total of 120,000 drachmas and £500 in the settlement.

== See also ==
- History of nationality in Gibraltar

== Footnotes ==
1. Hansard CXII (3d Ser.), 380–444, Retrieved 28 March 2006.
2. Civitas Review, Volume 2, Issue 1; March, 2005 (pdf), Retrieved 28 March 2006.

== Bibliography ==
- Hannell, David. "Lord Palmerston and the 'Don Pacifico Affair' of 1850: The Ionian Connection." European History Quarterly (1989) 19#4 pp: 495–508. online
- Hicks, Geoffrey. "Don Pacifico, Democracy, and Danger: The Protectionist Party Critique of British Foreign Policy, 1850–1852." International History Review (2004) 26 #3 pp: 515–540.
- Taylor, Derek. Don Pacifico: the acceptable face of gunboat diplomacy (Vallentine Mitchell, 2008)
- Whitten, Dolphus. "The Don Pacifico Affair." Historian (1986) 48#2 pp: 255–267.
- British and Foreign State Papers. 1849–1850. [2]. Vol. XXXIX (London: Harrison and Sons 1863). [Don Pacifico materials at pp. 332 ff. and pp. 480 ff.]
- Evelyn Ashley, The Life of Henry John Temple, Viscount Palmerston: 1846–1865, with selections from his Speeches and Correspondence Volume I (London: Richard Bentley 1876).
- John Alden (editor), Representative British Orations Volume 4 (G. P. Putnam's Sons, 1900), pp. 125–224 [Palmerston in the House of Commons, June 25, 1850].
- Charles Holte Bracebridge, A Letter on the Affairs of Greece, (London: G. Barclay 1850) [originally appeared in the London newspaper, the Daily News, of May 21, 1850; he was present in Athens in the second half of April, 1850].
- The Speeches of the late Right Honourable Sir Robert Peel, Bart. Volume IV (London: Routledge 1853) 846–855 [Peel's last speech to the House of Commons, on the Don Pacifico affair].
- George W. E. Russell, The Right Honourable William Ewart Gladstone (New York: Harper 1891). pp. 102–110 [his speech to the House of Commons, on the Don Pacifico affair].
- Anthony Trollope, Lord Palmerston (London: Wm. Isbister 1882)
- Albert E. Hogan, Pacific Blockade (Oxford: Clarendon Press 1908), pp. 105–114.
