= John Edward Bearcroft =

Royal Navy Admiral (1851–1931)

Admiral John Edward Bearcroft CB MVO
- Born: 18 August 1851
- Died: 5 September 1931 (aged 80)
- Military career
- Allegiance: United Kingdom
- Branch: Royal Navy
- Rank: Admiral
- Commands: HMS Resolution; HMS Edgar; HMS Essex
- Awards: Companion of the Order of the Bath

Admiral John Edward Bearcroft, CB, MVO (18 August 1851 – 5 September 1931) was a British Royal Navy officer in the early 20th century, who served as Admiral-Superintendent of Contract-built ships in the Clyde district from 1906 to 1911.

== Naval career ==
Bearcroft joined the Royal Navy in the 1880s.

He was promoted to the rank of captain on 30 June 1895, and held successive commands of the gun vessel HMS Linnet and the cruiser HMS Philomel. While in command of Philomel, he saw active service in South Africa during the Second Boer War, for which he was appointed a Companion of the Order of the Bath (CB). On 16 September 1902 he was appointed in command of the pre-dreadnought battleship HMS Resolution, serving as guard ship at Holyhead. Following a command of HMS Edgar, he was the first captain to commission the armored cruiser HMS Essex in March 1904, serving on the Channel Squadron. He was appointed assistant to the Admiral Commanding Coastguard and Reserves in October 1904, and served as such for two years. In February 1906 he was promoted to flag rank as rear-admiral, and three months later he was in May 1906 appointed Admiral-Superintendent of Contract Built ships in the Clyde district. He served as such until 1911, when he retired.
