= Gunboat diplomacy =

Pursuit of foreign policy objectives with the aid of conspicuous displays of naval power

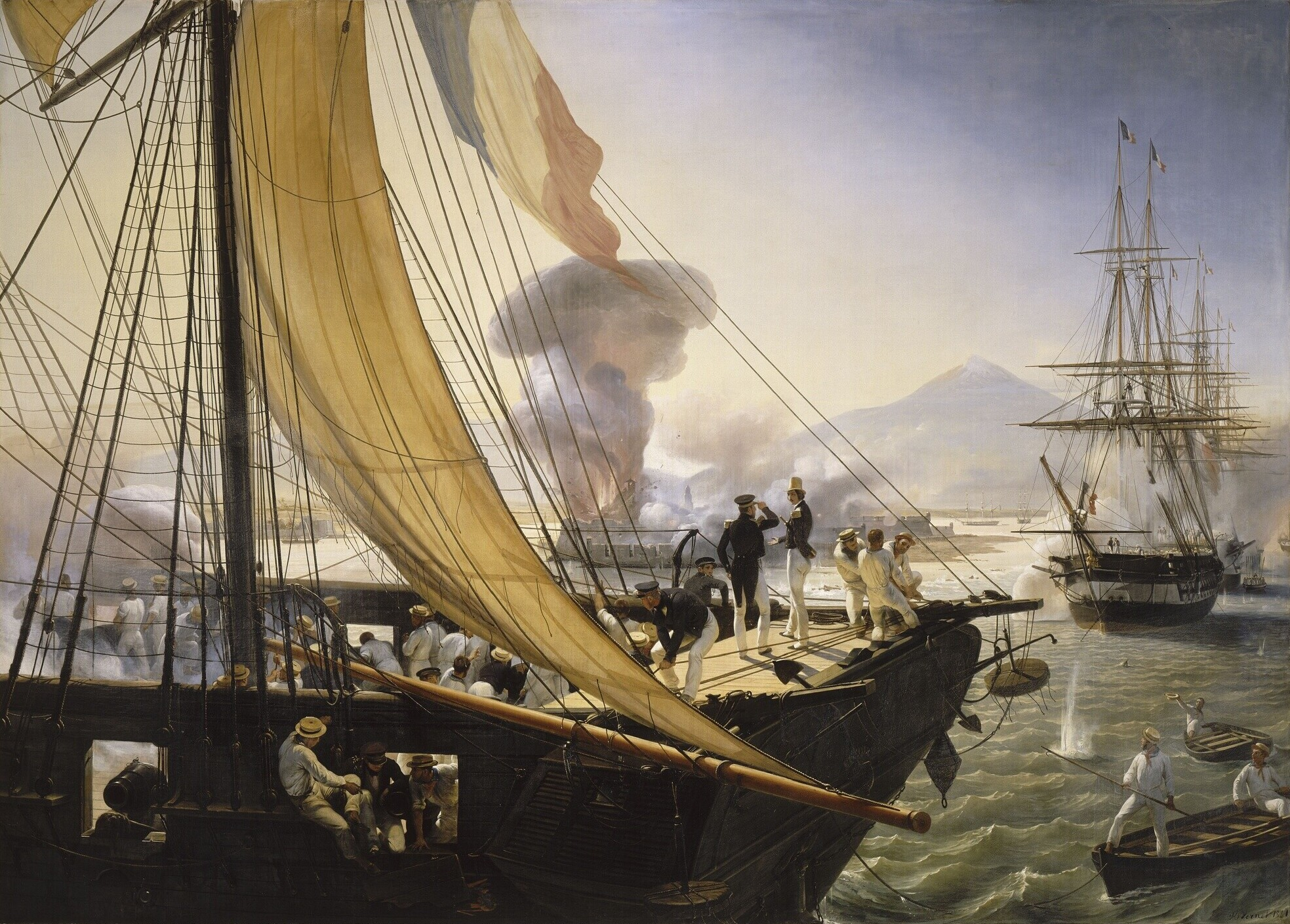
The Pastry War, an instance of French gunboat diplomacy

Gunboat diplomacy is the pursuit of foreign policy objectives with the aid of conspicuous displays of naval power, implying or constituting a direct threat of warfare should terms not be agreeable to the superior force. The term originated in the 19th century, during the age of imperialism, when Western powers would use their superior military capabilities, particularly their naval assets, to intimidate less powerful nations into granting concessions. The mere presence of warships off a country's coast was often enough to have a significant effect, making the actual use of force rarely necessary.

== Etymology ==
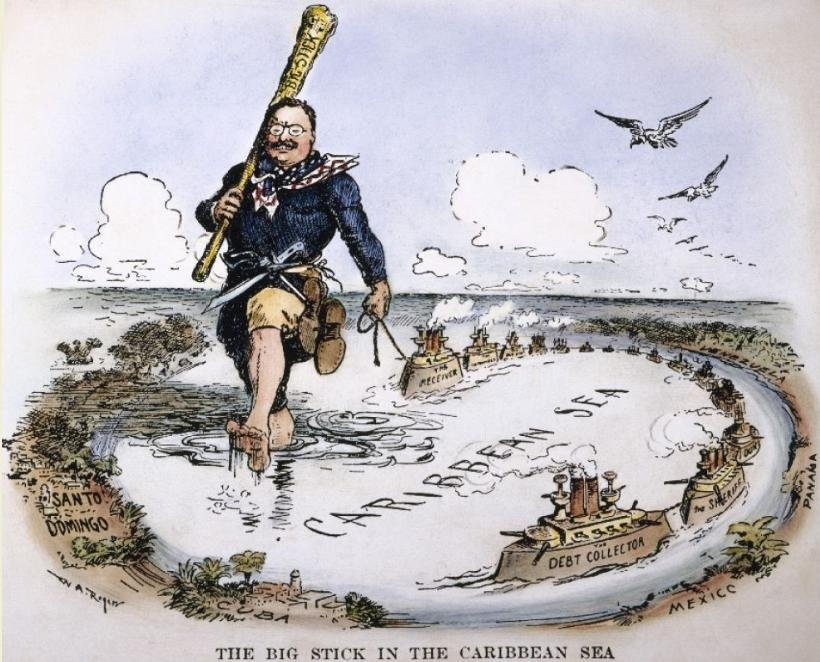
William Allen Rogers's 1904 cartoon recreates the big-stick diplomacy of U.S. President Theodore Roosevelt as an episode in Gulliver's Travels.

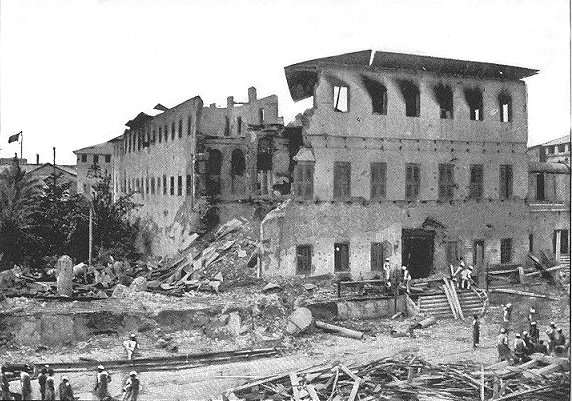
Damage to the palace complex of the sultan of Zanzibar after bombardment by Royal Navy cruisers and gunboats on 27 August 1896. The Anglo-Zanzibar War lasted less than 45 minutes.

The term "gunboat diplomacy" comes from the nineteenth-century period of imperialism, when Western powers – from Europe and the United States – would intimidate other, less powerful entities into granting concessions through a demonstration of Western superior military capabilities, usually represented by their naval assets. A coastal country negotiating with a Western power would notice that a warship or fleet of ships had appeared off its coast. The mere sight of such power almost always had a considerable effect, and it was rarely necessary for such boats to use other measures, such as demonstrations of firepower.

A notable example of gunboat diplomacy, the Don Pacifico affair in 1850, saw the British Foreign Secretary Lord Palmerston dispatch a squadron of the Royal Navy to blockade the Greek port of Piraeus in retaliation for the assault of a British subject, David Pacifico, in Athens, and the subsequent failure of the government of King Otto to compensate the Gibraltar-born (and therefore British) Pacifico.

The effectiveness of such simple demonstrations of a nation's projection of force capabilities meant that nations with naval power and command of the sea could establish military bases (for example, Diego Garcia, 1940s onwards) and arrange economically advantageous relationships around the world. Aside from military conquest, gunboat diplomacy was the dominant way to establish new trade relationships, colonial outposts, and expansion of empire.

Peoples lacking the resources or technological innovations available to Western empires found that their own relationships were readily dismantled in the face of such pressures, and some therefore came to depend on the imperialist nations for access to raw materials or overseas markets.

== Theory ==
Diplomat and naval thinker James Cable spelled out the nature of gunboat diplomacy in a series of works published between 1971 and 1993. In these, he defined the phenomenon as "the use or threat of limited naval force, otherwise than as an act of war, in order to secure advantage or to avert loss, either in the furtherance of an international dispute or else against foreign nationals within the territory or the jurisdiction of their own state." He further broke down the concept into four key areas:

- Definitive Force: the use of gunboat diplomacy to create or remove a fait accompli.
- Purposeful Force: application of naval force to change the policy or character of the target government or group.
- Catalytic Force: a mechanism designed to buy a breathing space or present policy makers with an increased range of options.
- Expressive Force: use of navies to send a political message. This aspect of gunboat diplomacy is undervalued and almost dismissed by Cable.

The term "gunboat" may imply naval power-projection - land-based equivalents may include military mobilisation (as in Europe in the northern-hemisphere summer of 1914), the massing of threatening bodies of troops near international borders (as practised by the German Reich in central Europe in the 1940s), or appropriately timed and situated military manoeuvres ("exercises").

=== Distinctions ===
Gunboat diplomacy contrasts with views held prior to the 18th century and influenced by Hugo Grotius, who in De jure belli ac pacis (1625) circumscribed the right to resort to force with what he described as "temperamenta".

Gunboat diplomacy is distinct from "defence diplomacy", which is understood to be the peaceful application of resources from across the spectrum of defence to achieve positive outcomes in the development of bilateral and multilateral relationships. "Military diplomacy" is a sub-set of this, tending to refer only to the role of military attachés and their associated activity. Defence diplomacy does not include military operations, but subsumes such other defence activity as international personnel exchanges, ship and aircraft visits, high-level engagement (e.g., ministers and senior defence personnel), training and exercises, security-sector reform, and bilateral military talks.

== Modern contexts ==
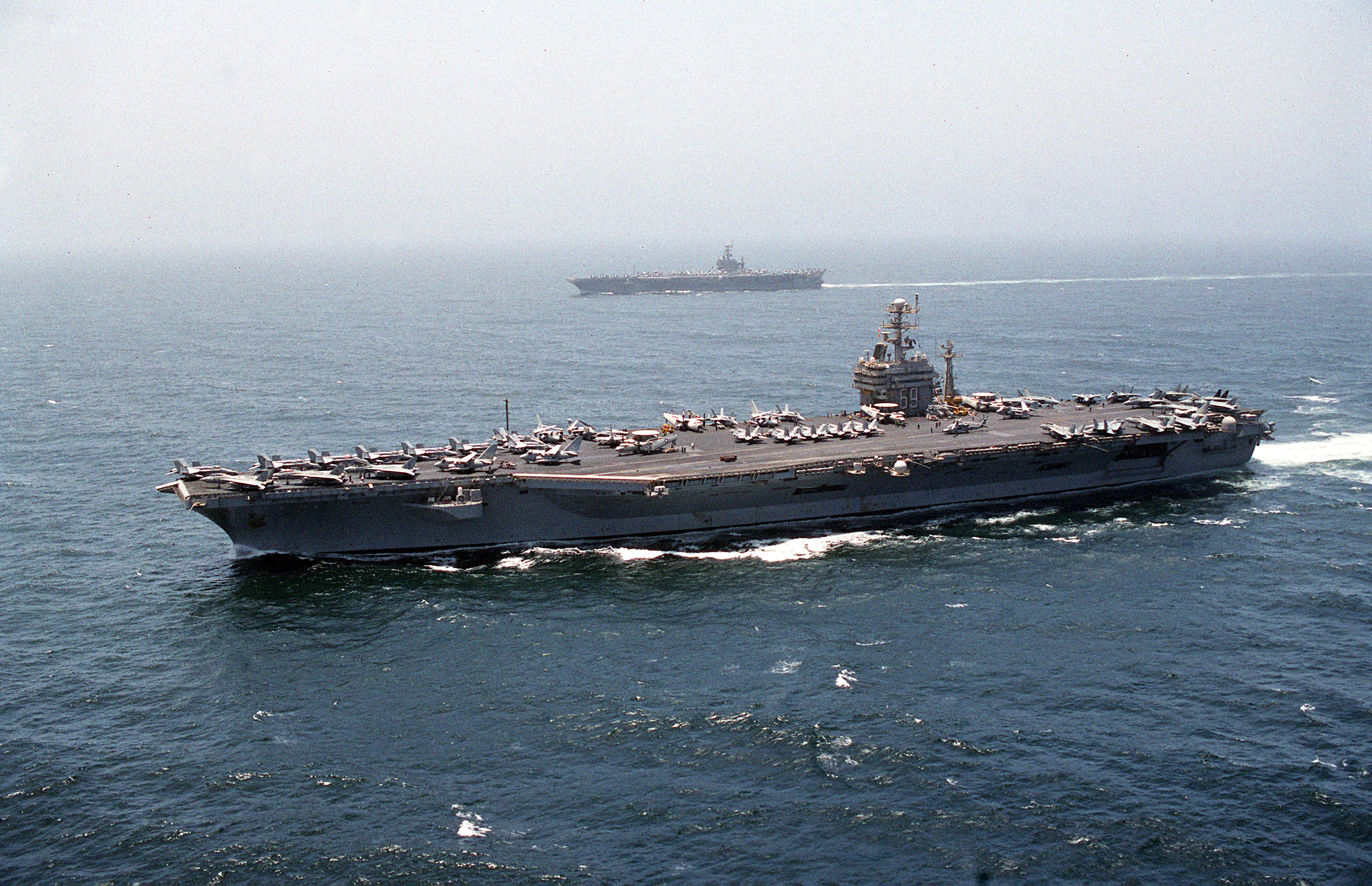
The Nimitz-class aircraft carrier, a powerful capital ship currently in service

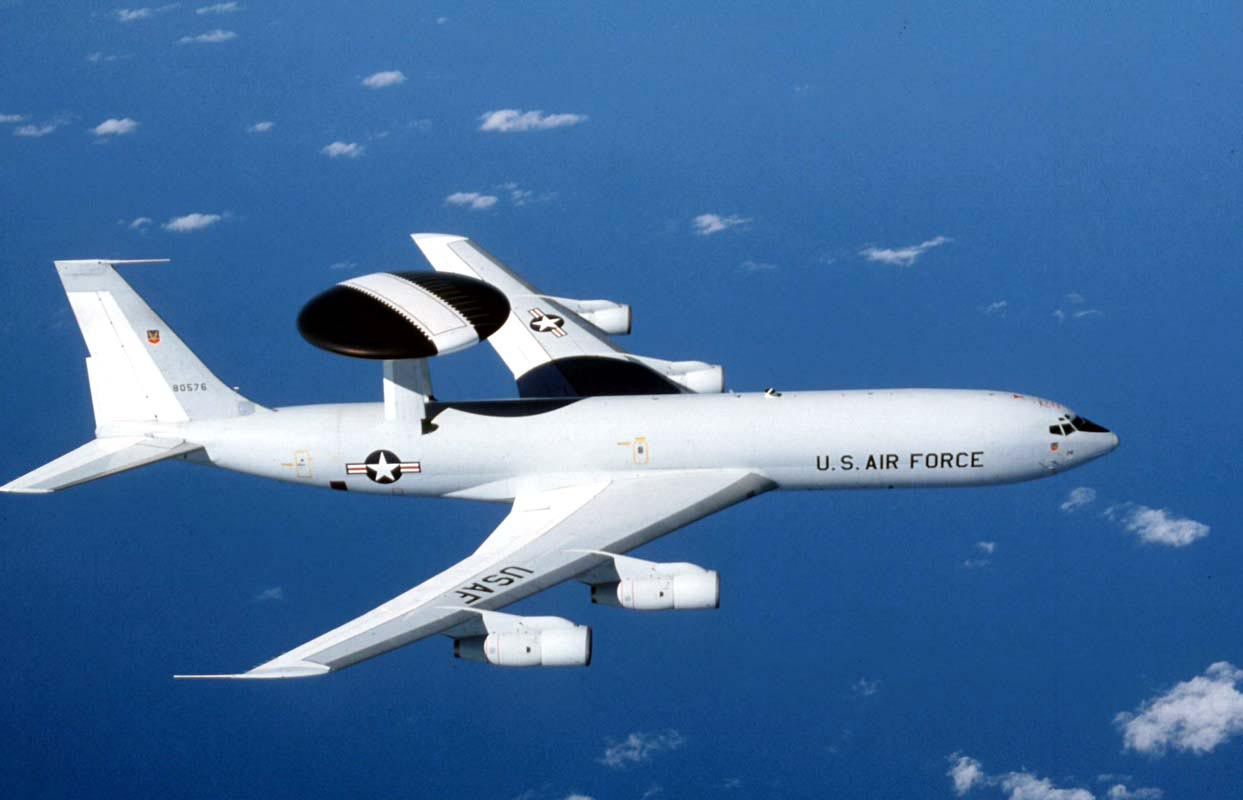
E-3 AWACS, surveillance and radar aircraft often used in a modern-day form of gunboat diplomacy

Gunboat diplomacy is considered a form of hegemony. As the United States became a military power in the first decade of the 20th century, the Rooseveltian version of gunboat diplomacy, Big Stick Diplomacy, was partially superseded by dollar diplomacy: replacing the big stick with the "juicy carrot" of American private investment. However, during Woodrow Wilson's presidency, conventional gunboat diplomacy did occur, most notably in the case of the U.S. Army's occupation of Veracruz in 1914, during the Mexican Revolution.

Gunboat diplomacy in the post-Cold War world is still largely based on naval forces, owing to the U.S. Navy's overwhelming sea power. U.S. administrations have frequently changed the disposition of their major naval fleets to influence opinion in foreign capitals. More urgent diplomatic points were made by the Clinton administration in the Yugoslav wars of the 1990s (in alliance with the Blair administration) and elsewhere, using sea-launched Tomahawk missiles, and E-3 AWACS airborne surveillance aircraft in a more passive display of military presence. Henry Kissinger, during his tenure as United States Secretary of State, summed up the concept thusly: "An aircraft carrier is 100,000 tons of diplomacy."

== Notable examples ==
=== 18th century ===
- Anson's visit to Canton in 1741
- Britain's treaty with Oman (1798)

=== 19th century ===
- Battle of La Guaira (1812)
- Second Barbary War (1815)
- Commodore Perry Mission to Venezuela (1819)
- Haiti indemnity controversy (1825)
- French blockade of the Río de la Plata (1838 -1840)
- Mexican Pastry War (1838–39)
- First Opium War (1839-1842)
- Paulet Affair (1843)
- Aberdeen Act (1845)
- Anglo-French blockade of the Río de la Plata (1845-1850)
- Don Pacifico Incident (1850)
- Yangtze River Patrol (1850s–1930s)
- Second Anglo-Burmese War (1852)
- Commodore Perry Mission to Japan (1853–54)
- Borlund Affair (1854)
- Isla de Aves Affair (1854)
- Blockade of La Guaira (1856)
- Second Opium War (1856-1860)
- Paraguay expedition (1858–1859)
- Urrutia Protocol Affair (1858)
- Eduardo Romay Affair (1859)
- Christie Affair (1861–1865)
- Shimonoseki Campaign (1863–1864)
- Chincha Islands War (1865–1879)
- Bombardment of Valparaíso (1866)
- Battle of Callao (1866)
- Shinmiyangyo in Korea (1871)
- Ganghwa Island incident (1875)
- Banco de Londres y Rio de La Plata incident (1876)
- Eisenstück affair (1877–1878)
- Tonkin Flotilla (1883)
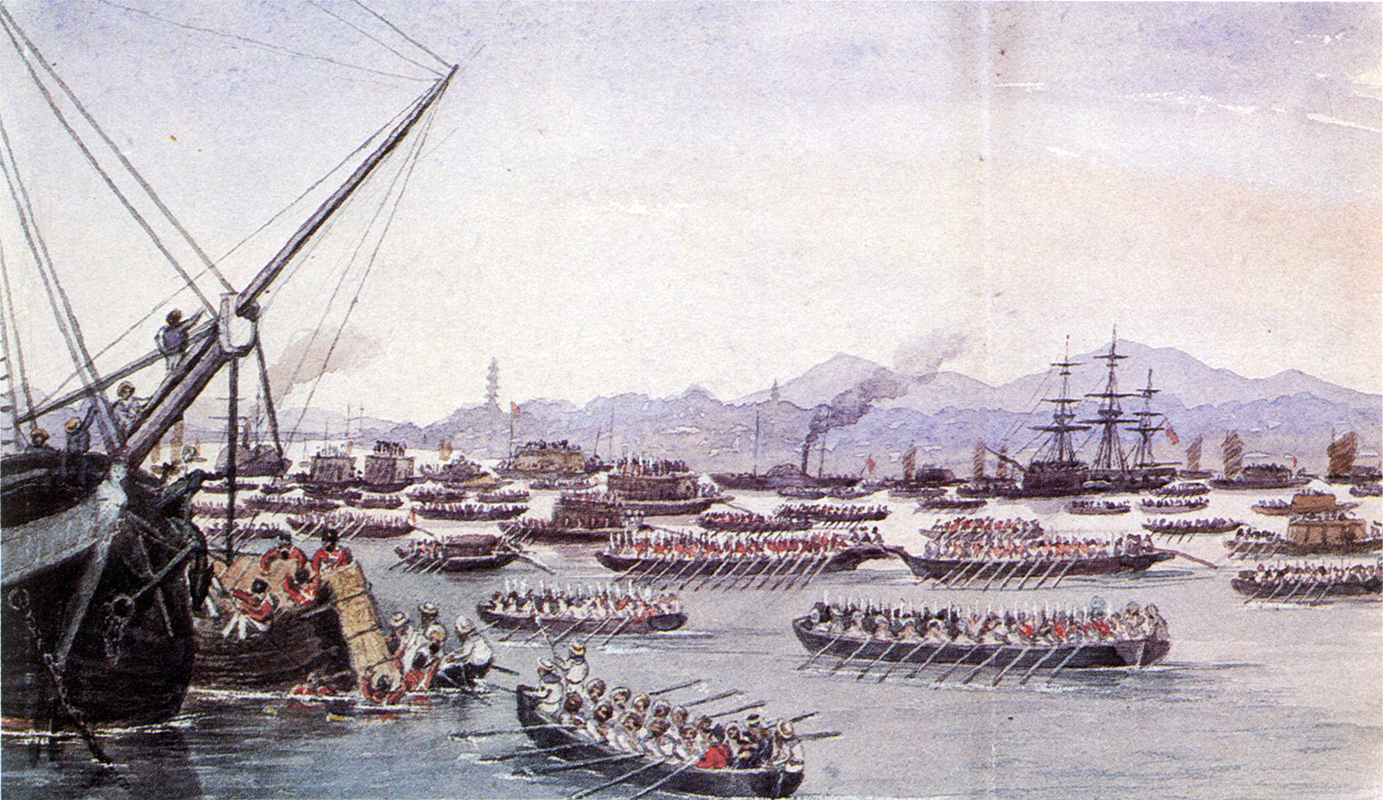
  Royal Navy ships in Canton during the First Opium War in 1841
- German East Africa (1885)
- Panama crisis (1885)
- Samoan crisis (1887–1889)
- Môle Saint-Nicolas affair (1889–1891)
- 1890 British Ultimatum
- USS Baltimore crisis (1891)
- Itata incident (1891)
- Venezuelan Legalist Revolution (1892)
- Franco-Siamese crisis of 1893
- Nicaragua Crisis of 1894–1895
- Anglo-Zanzibar War (1896)
- Lüders Affair (1897)
- Cerruti Affair (1898)
- USS Wilmington cruise in Orinoco river (1899)

=== 20th century ===
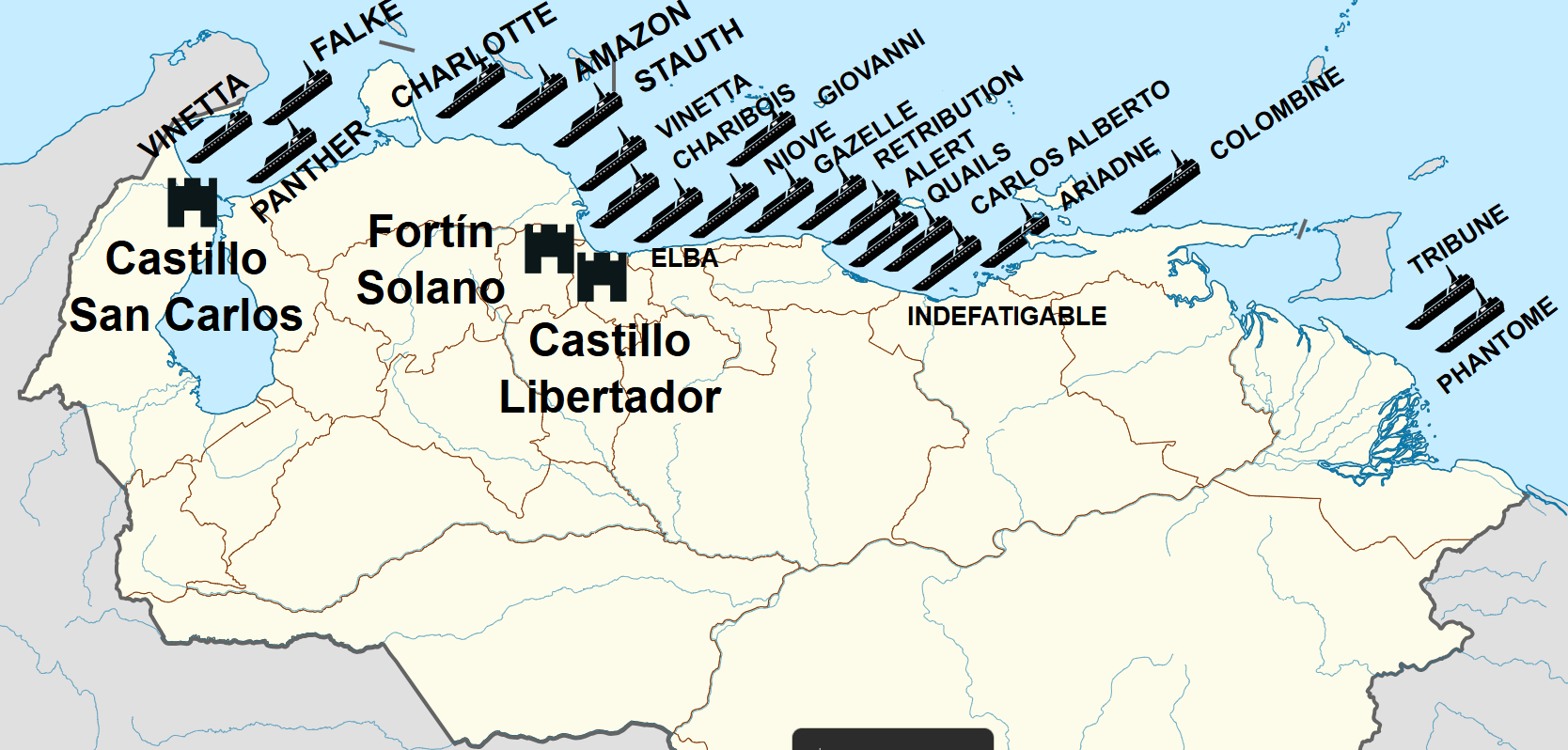
European warships involved on the blockade of Venezuelan coasts 1902–1903

- Bombarment of Riohacha (1901)
- Venezuelan crisis of 1902–1903
- Panama separation from Colombia (1903)
- Dogger Bank Incident (1904)
- Great White Fleet (1907)
- Honduras war (1907)
- Dutch–Venezuelan crisis (1908)
- William I.Buchanan mission in Venezuela (1908)
- Agadir Crisis (1911)
- United States occupation of Veracruz (1914)
- Danzig crisis (1932)
- First Taiwan Strait Crisis (1954–55)
- Second Taiwan Strait Crisis (1958)
- Operation Vantage (1961)
- Operation Brother Sam (1964)
- Operation Paul Bunyan (1976)
- Lebanese Civil War (1983–1984)
- Third Taiwan Strait Crisis (1995–96)

=== 21st century ===
- Spratly Islands dispute
- 2022 Chinese military exercises around Taiwan
- Proposed United States invasion of Venezuela
- Operation Southern Spear
- Operation Absolute Resolve
- 2026 United States military buildup in the Middle East

United States military buildup in the Caribbean during Operation Southern Spear

== See also ==
- Brinkmanship
- Compellence
- Deterrence theory
- Fleet in being
- Greenland crisis
- Intervention (international law)
- Interventionism (politics)
- Madman theory
- Peace through strength
- Police action
- Power projection
- List of United States invasions of Latin American countries
