= Police action =

Military action undertaken without a declaration of war

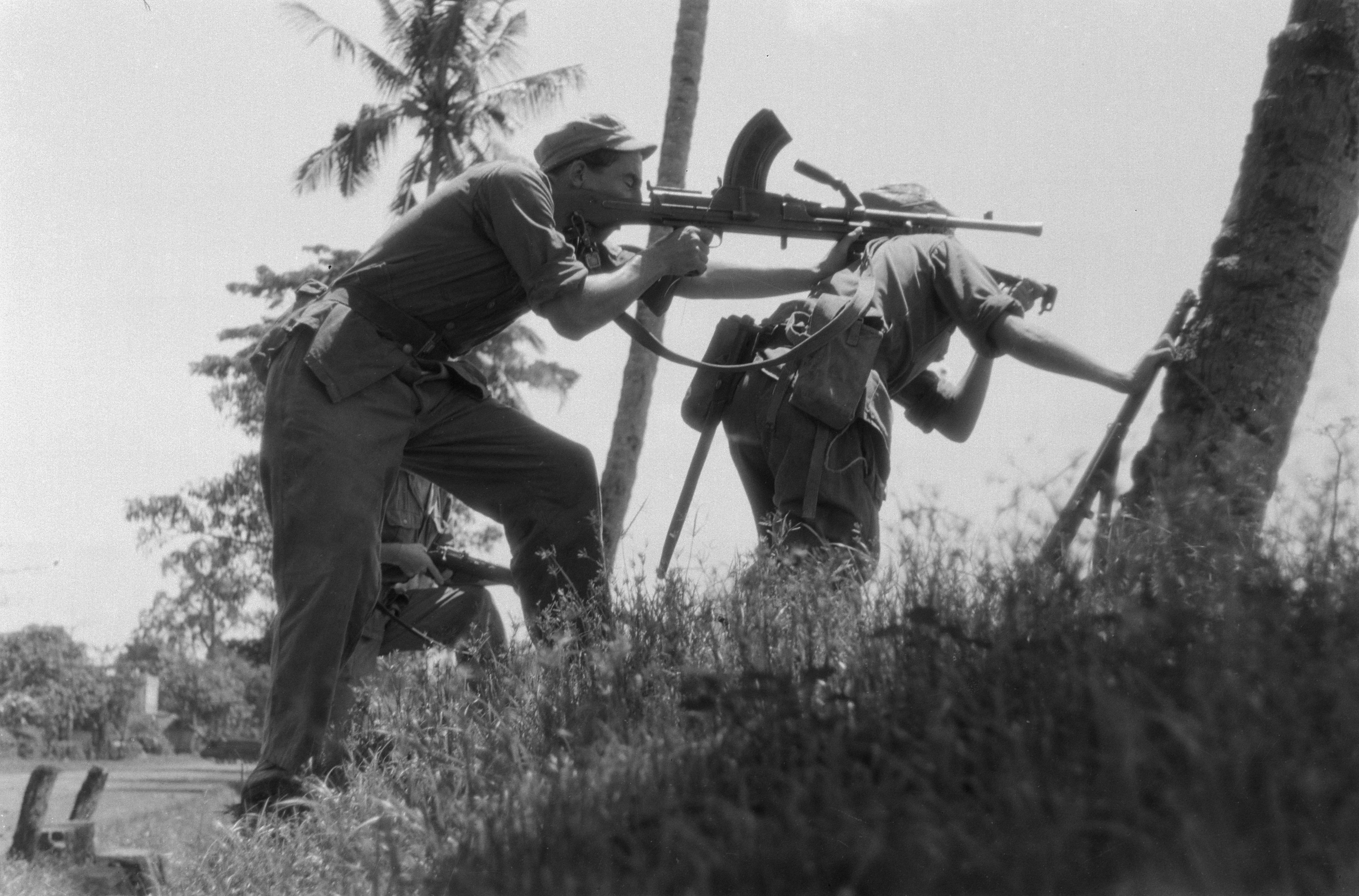
Dutch troops during Operation Kraai, a 1948 police action of the Indonesian National Revolution.

In security studies and international relations, a police action is a military action undertaken without a formal declaration of war. In the 21st century, the term has been largely supplanted by "counter-insurgency" or "special military operation". Since World War II, formal declarations of war have been rare, especially military actions conducted by the Global North during the Cold War. Rather, nations involved in military conflict (especially the great powers) sometimes describe the conflict by fighting the war under the auspices of a "police action" to show that it is a limited military operation, different from total war.

The earliest use of the phrase dates back to 1883, describing attempts by Dutch and British forces to liberate the 28-man crew of the SS Nisero, who were held hostage in Sumatra. The Dutch term politionele acties (police actions) was used for this. Merriam-Webster's Collegiate Dictionary called it, in its Eleventh Edition, a localized military action undertaken without formal declaration of war by regular armed forces against persons (as guerrillas or aggressors) held to be violators of international peace and order. It was also used to imply a formal claim of sovereignty by colonial powers, such as in the military actions of the Netherlands, the United Kingdom, and Western powers during conflicts such as the Indonesian National Revolution and the Malayan Emergency.

== Examples of police actions ==
=== Pre-Cold War ===
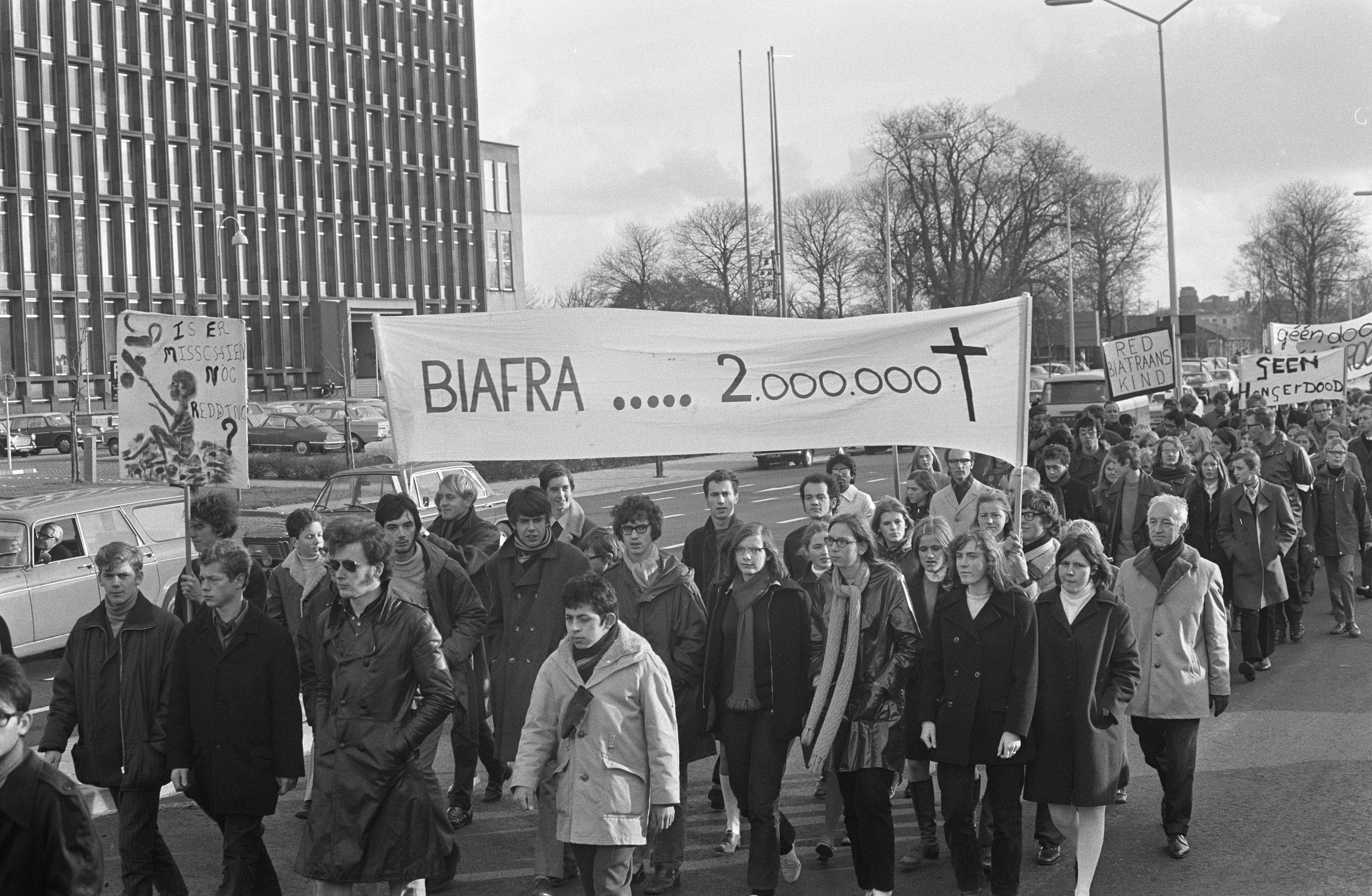
The implementation of a "police action" that resulted in the Nigerian Civil War caused international protests in locations such as The Hague against the widespread war crimes suffered by civilians.

The various Banana Wars, from 21 April 1898 to 1 August 1934, were called police actions by the US government.

The two major Dutch military offensives, of July 1947 and December 1948, during the Indonesian National Revolution were referred to by the Dutch government as the first and second politionele acties.

The 1948 action, by India, against Hyderabad State, code named Operation Polo, was referred to as a police action by the government.

=== Cold War ===
==== Korean War ====
Initially during the Korean War (1950–1953), American President Harry S. Truman referred to United States' responses to the North Korean invasion of South Korea as a "police action" under the aegis of the United Nations, as the United States never formally declared war and the operation was conducted under the auspices of the UN flag. “The loose notion of a ‘police action’ would later be used by President Truman as a legal pretext for going to war in Korea without congressional approval."

During a June 1950 press conference, President Truman explicitly remarked that the "United Nations Security Council held a meeting and passed on the situation and asked the members to go to the relief of the Korean Republic" with the aim "to suppress a bandit raid" occurring. A retrospective piece on the fighting from the Canadian news publication Ottawa Citizen in 2023 said that, "the conflict left 515 Canadians dead — yet for years it was not even called a war" due to the terminology of it being "referred to as a 'police action'". Writer Tom MacGregor noted that even when the "sailors, soldiers and air personnel came home...there were no parades or official recognition for the war they had fought,” although eventually the "Korean War was added to the National War Memorial in Ottawa [such that after 1982] its veterans can stand with all other veterans who have served".

==== Vietnam War ====
The Vietnam War was an undeclared war and hence is sometimes described as a police action.

==== Other ====
Shortly after the secession of Biafra in 1967, which took place during a period of chaotic political turmoil, the Nigerian military government launched a "police action" to retake the secessionist territory, and the rising violence turned into the Nigerian Civil War. During a May 2017 remembrance event, Ohanaeze Ndigbo leader John Nnia Nwodo stated that "Nigeria faced disintegration by the declaration of the Republic of Biafra" and lamented how the "commencement of a police action that turned into a three years civil war" caused "sacrifice — in blood, suffering and toil".

=== Post-Cold War ===
The Soviet–Afghan War and the Kargil War were also undeclared wars and hence sometimes described as police actions, especially since the initial troop deployments into Afghanistan were at the request of the Afghan government.

In other events, the U.S. Congress had not made a formal declaration of war, yet the US President, as the commander-in-chief, has claimed authority to send in the armed forces when he deemed necessary, with or without the approval of Congress. The legal legitimacy of each of these actions was based upon declarations such as the Gulf of Tonkin Resolution and Iraq Resolution (2002) by Congress and various United Nations resolutions. Nonetheless, Congressional approval has been asserted by means of funding appropriations or other authorizations as well as the contested War Powers Resolution.

The United Nations approved police action during the 2011 military intervention in Libya to protect civilians. Since the September 11 attacks, states have militarily pursued individuals they deem terrorists within the borders of other states in a form of police action that is not clearly defined in the international law.

So-called "Indonesian security forces" use police actions against uprisings of Papuans in the easternmost province. The Indonesian police have been empowered to lead the counterinsurgency operation against the Free Papuan Movement (OPM). Nonetheless, the Indonesian police's deficiencies in battling OPM require that the police maintain a strong partnership with the Indonesian military.

== Under international law ==
Police actions are authorized specifically by the UN Security Council under Article 53 (for regional action) or Article 42 (for global action). In both cases, the term used in the United Nations Charter text (English) is “enforcement action”; the term “police action” is not used.

== Appropriate use of the term ==
Use of the term does not appear to have gained currency outside of the limited arena of justification of military action: for example, the United States Navy refers to the Korean conflict as the Korean War, and when they refer to police action, they surround the term in quotation marks.

Similarly, a plaque at the Vietnam Veterans Memorial refers to the Vietnam War as a war, not a police action, even though it was undeclared.

Use of the term "police action" is intended to imply either a claim of formal sovereignty or of authority to intervene militarily at a nation's own discretion, typically unilaterally or with a small group of nations. This is often done through the United Nations or by asserting that the military operation is defensive or humanitarian in nature such as the United Nations Stabilisation Mission in Haiti or the Invasion of Grenada.

== See also ==
- War Powers Resolution of 1973
- Declaration of war by the United States
- Humanitarian intervention
- Intervention (international law)
- Interventionism (politics)
- Special military operation
- Gun boat diplomacy
- Korean War
