= James Goodrich (Royal Navy officer) =

Royal Navy Admiral; Commander-in-Chief, Pacific Station (1851–1925)

Admiral Sir James Goodrich KCVO
- Born: 28 June 1851
- Died: 1 September 1925 (aged 74)
- Military career
- Allegiance: United Kingdom
- Branch: Royal Navy
- Rank: Admiral
- Commands: HMS London; Pacific Station
- Conflicts: World War I
- Awards: Knight Commander of the Royal Victorian Order

Admiral Sir James Edward Clifford Goodrich KCVO (28 June 1851 – 1 September 1925) was the last Commander-in-Chief, Pacific Station.

== Naval career ==
Goorich was appointed a lieutenant in the Royal Navy in 1872, and promoted to commander in 1888 and captain in 1895. From 25 March 1900 he was in command of the battleship HMS Colossus, guardship at Holyhead, and in November 1901 he and the crew transferred to HMS Resolution, which succeeded as guardship. On 7 June 1902 he was appointed in command of the new battleship HMS London, which was commissioned for service in the Mediterranean Fleet, and left Portsmouth in early July for Gibraltar. Briefly returning to home waters in August, London served as flagship for the Coronation Review for King Edward VII at Spithead on 16 August 1902, before she was back with the Mediterranean Fleet. He was appointed a Member (4th class) of the Royal Victorian Order (MVO) during the King's visit to Naples in April 1903.

He then served as Commander-in-Chief, Pacific Station from his appointment in 1903 to its closure in 1905. Improved communications, the signing of the Anglo-Japanese Alliance and the need to concentrate warships in British waters to counter the developing German High Seas Fleet, meant that the station was closed down at sunset on 1 March 1905. After being promoted to rear admiral in October 1905, he was appointed admiral superintendent of the Gibraltar Dockyard in 1906. He was promoted to Knight Commander of the Royal Victorian Order (KCVO) in the 1908 Birthday Honours. He was promoted to vice-admiral in 1910, and his final promotion was to Admiral in 1913 just ahead of his retirement, although he was recalled to serve as a captain in the Royal Naval Reserve during World War I.

He died in 1925 and a memorial to him stands in St Cyr's Churchyard in Stinchcombe in Gloucestershire.

== Family ==
He married Adeline Rose Helbert who helped with the founding of West Downs School.

Military offices
Preceded by Andrew Bickford	Commander-in-Chief, Pacific Station; 1903–1905	Succeeded by Post disbanded
