= Civis Romanus sum =

Latin phrase meaning "I am a Roman citizen"

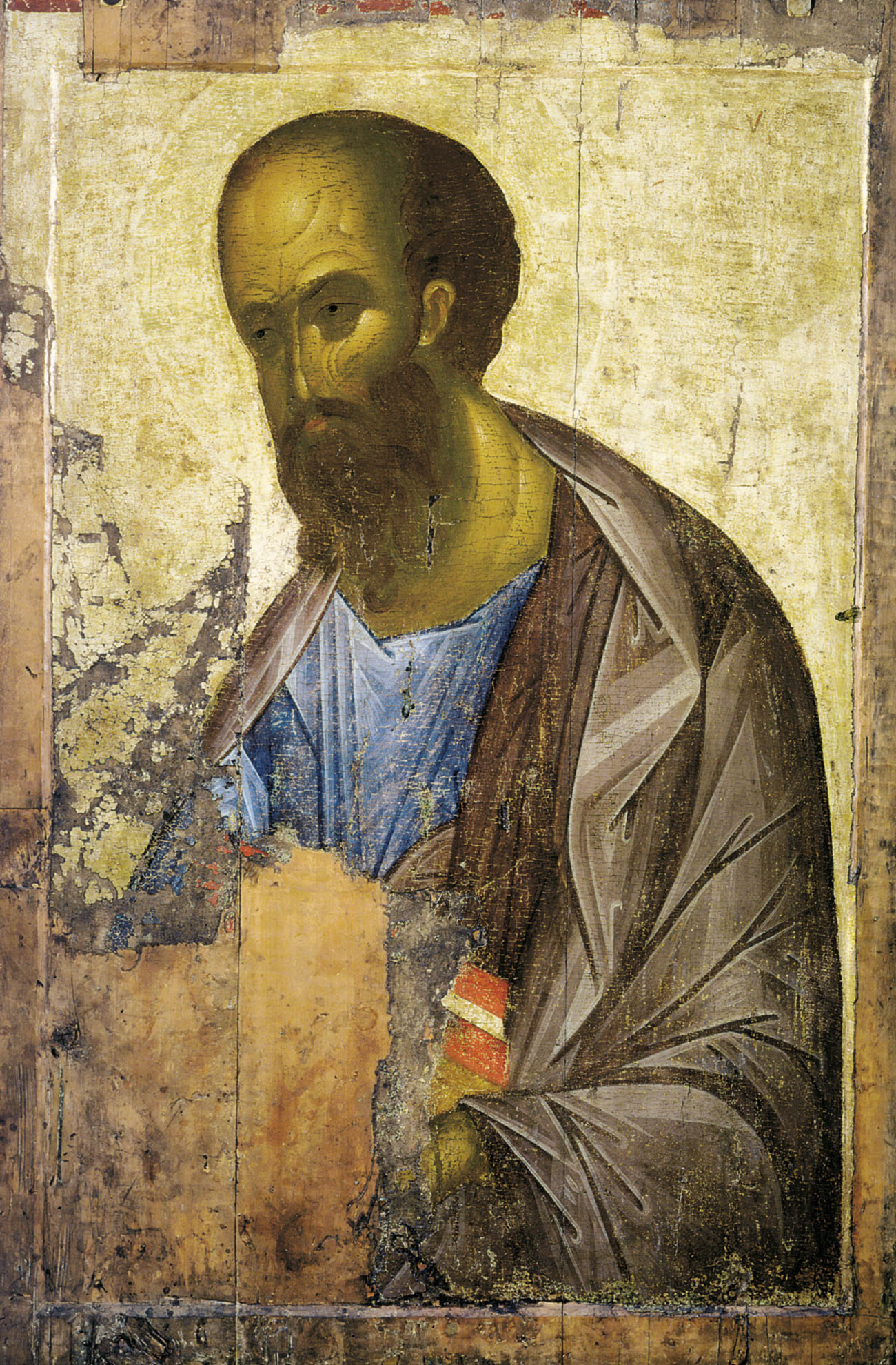
- The Apostle Paul, a prominent historical figure who famously invoked his rights as a Roman citizen under the law.
- Origin: Ancient Rome
- Original form: Latin
- Context: Legal maxim, political declaration, proverb
- Meaning: I am a Roman citizen

The Latin phrase cīvis Rōmānus sum (Classical Latin: [ˈkiːwis roːˈmaːnus ˈsũː]; "I am (a) Roman citizen") is a phrase used in Cicero's In Verrem as a plea for the legal rights of a Roman citizen. When travelling across the Roman Empire, safety was said to be guaranteed to anyone who declared, "civis Romanus sum".

== Paul the Apostle ==
In the New Testament book of Acts, chapter 22, Paul the Apostle, when imprisoned and on trial, claimed his right as a Roman citizen to be tried before Caesar, and the judicial process had to be suspended until he was taken to Rome:

22 Up to this word they listened to him. Then they raised their voices and said, "Away with such a fellow from the earth! For he should not be allowed to live." 23 And as they were shouting and throwing off their cloaks and flinging dust into the air, 24 the tribune ordered him to be brought into the barracks, saying that he should be examined by flogging, to find out why they were shouting against him like this. 25 But when they had stretched him out for the whips,[a] Paul said to the centurion who was standing by, "Is it lawful for you to flog a man who is a Roman citizen and uncondemned?" 26 When the centurion heard this, he went to the tribune and said to him, "What are you about to do? For this man is a Roman citizen." 27 So the tribune came and said to him, "Tell me, are you a Roman citizen?" And he said, "Yes". 28 The tribune answered, "I bought this citizenship for a large sum." Paul said, "But I am a citizen by birth." 29 So those who were about to examine him withdrew from him immediately, and the tribune also was afraid, for he realized that Paul was a Roman citizen and that he had bound him. (ESV)

== British Empire ==
=== Don Pacifico affair ===
The exchange was quoted by Lord Palmerston when called to explain his decision to blockade Greece during the Don Pacifico affair. In his speech in the Houses of Parliament on June 25, 1850, he claimed that every British subject in the world should be protected by the British Empire like a Roman citizen in the Roman Empire.

=== Nirad Chaudhuri ===
Nirad Chaudhuri's masterpiece, The Autobiography of an Unknown Indian, published in 1951, included seemingly pro-colonial themes which courted controversy in the newly independent India due to the dedication of the book, which ran thus:

To the memory of the British Empire in India,
Which conferred subjecthood upon us,
But withheld citizenship.
To which yet every one of us threw out the challenge:
"Civis Britannicus sum"
Because all that was good and living within us
Was made, shaped and quickened
By the same British rule.

Chaudhuri argued that his critics were not careful-enough readers; "the dedication was really a condemnation of the British rulers for not treating us as equals", he wrote in a 1997 special edition of Granta, as it "was an imitation of what Cicero said about the conduct of Verres[.]"

== American context ==
=== Charles Sumner ===
Charles Sumner, an American senator from Massachusetts, related a similar phrase in his famous "The Crime Against Kansas" speech in 1856, stating "I fearlessly assert that the wrongs of much-abused Sicily...were small by the side of the wrongs of Kansas...where the cry "I am an American citizen" has been interposed in vain against outrage of every kind, even upon life itself".

=== John F. Kennedy ===
American president John F. Kennedy used the phrase in 1963: "Two thousand years ago, the proudest boast was 'civis Romanus sum'. Today, in the world of freedom, the proudest boast is 'Ich bin ein Berliner'."

== In popular culture ==
A variation of the phrase is mentioned in an episode of The West Wing. In Season 1, Episode 3 ("A Proportional Response"), President Josiah Bartlet states, "Did you know that two thousand years ago, a Roman citizen could walk across the face of the known world, free of the fear of molestation? He could walk across the earth unharmed, cloaked only in the protection of the words 'Civis romanus' - 'I am a Roman citizen'. So great was the retribution of Rome, universally understood as certain, should any harm befall even one of its citizens."

In Monstrous Regiment by Terry Pratchett, part of the Discworld novel series, chief editor and founder of The Ankh Morpork Times William de Worde serves as a war correspondent, reporting on a war between Borogravia and its neighbours. He explains to a division of Borogravian soldiers the principle of 'Civis Ankhmorporkius sum' which allows him to not be classified as an enemy informant.

== See also ==
- List of Latin phrases
- Rights of Englishmen
