= Nisero Incident =

Shipwreck and subsequent events in Aceh in 1883

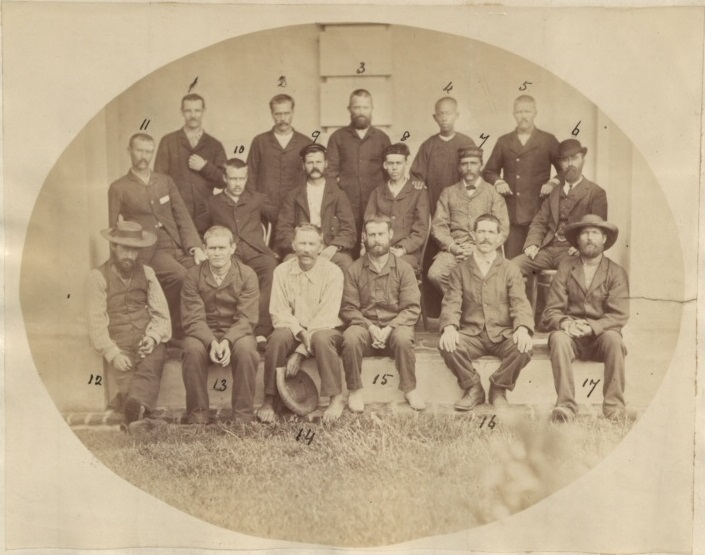
Crew members of the Nisero who were shipwrecked off the coast of Aceh in 1883 and held captive by a local chief for ten months.

The Nisero Incident arose when a British cargo ship, the Nisero, bound for Europe from Surabaya, Java, carrying a cargo of sugar, ran aground off the west coast of Aceh, Sumatra, on 8 November 1883. Seeing that the ship could not be saved, the 28 crew members rowed ashore and were met by a local chief, the Raja of Tenom, and a group of armed followers who took them into captivity. They spent much of their time over a period of ten months in huts, inside an enclosure guarded by the Raja's men, in miserable conditions, receiving usually two bowls of rice a day. Seven men died of cholera or malnutrition.

At first an attempt was made to rescue the men by force when a party of Dutch troops was sent ashore but were met with strong resistance and returned to their ship with the loss of several men. What followed was nine months of long, drawn out negotiations for their release with the Raja whose fluctuating demands included payment of a ransom and the reopening of his ports which were being blockaded by the Dutch with whom they were at war.

Finally, and with public anger against the British government's perceived inaction growing at home, a ransom was agreed, the men were released, after the British Colonial Secretary in Singapore delivered the money to the Raja on the beach, and they arrived safely back in England after ten months in captivity.

== History ==
On 12 June 1883 the cargo ship Nisero left Liverpool sailing along the Suez Canal stopping off at Penang and Singapore before arriving at Surabaya, Java, where it was loaded with a cargo of sugar, departing for Marseille on 28 October.

On 8 November it ran aground off the west coast of Aceh. The 28 crew members including its captain W.S. Woodhouse managed to reach the shore in a small boat and set up a camp on the beach. The next day a local chief, the Raja of Tenom, arrived with armed men and took them prisoner.

During their captivity the sailors were provided with limited food, usually two bowls of rice a day, and lived in leaky huts surrounded by high fences and watched by guards. The harsh climate, inadequate food and disease took their toll. The Raja of Tenom told the men that if he did not get what he wanted they would all be murdered.

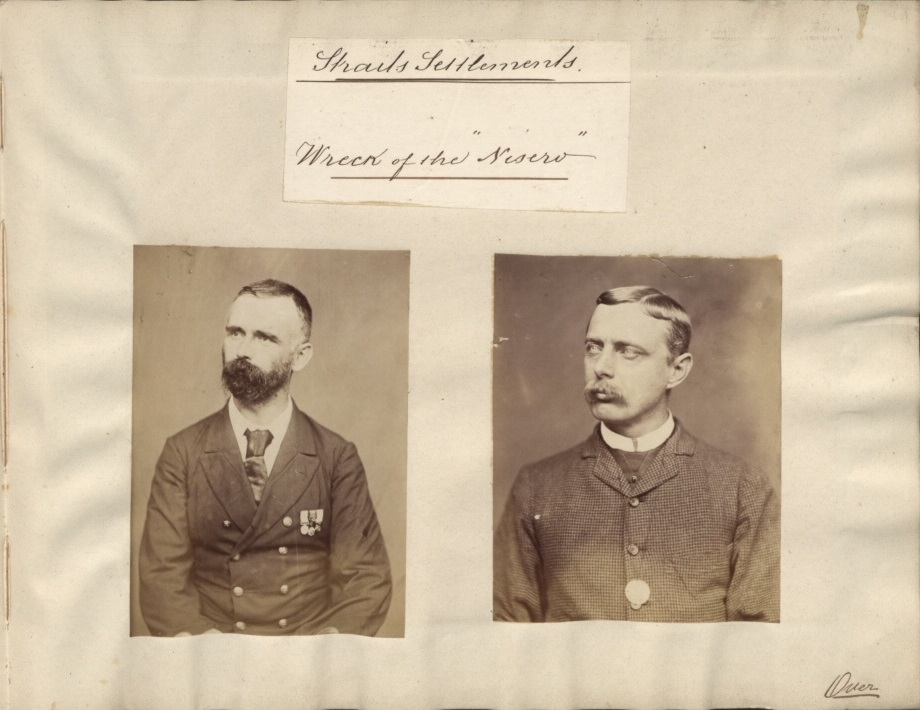
Captain Andrew Kennedy Bickford of the Pegasus and William Edward Maxwell, Colonial Secretary of the Straits Settlements, who headed the expedition in 1884 which led to the release of the crew of the Nisero.

On 9 December Captain Woodhouse told the Raja that he had received no reply to his letter to the Dutch consul and requested to board a nearby Dutch man-of-war to meet Consul Kennedy to try to mediate a settlement. Woodhouse told the Dutch that the Raja wanted a ransom and the promise that the British would not retaliate but the Dutch said this was impossible. Woodhouse said in his account that he then requested to return to his men as promised to the Raja but the Dutch refused to release him. He later joined the British ship the Pegasus under Captain Bickford when it arrived to try to rescue the men. Woodhouse returned to England and, together with Second Engineer Alex Kydd who was released due to sickness, were the only two men who got away.

At the end of December the British consul in Aceh had become aware of their capture and sent a message to them assuring them of a quick release. However, negotiations with the Raja over the conditions for the release continued into the following year without agreement. In response the British and Dutch decided to mount a rescue attempt. After the Pegasus bombarded Tenom, Dutch troops were sent ashore and engaged with the Raja's men and several Dutch soldiers were killed. Unable to locate the captives, who had been moved to the interior, they retreated back to their ship and no further attempt was made to rescue them.

Negotiations dragged on, complicated by the fact that the Raja was at war with the Dutch (Aceh War 1873–1904), and so discussions between them were impossible. In addition, the matter became a concern to the public in Great Britain. Anglo-Dutch relations became strained because the British were leading the negotiations for their release and, apart from the loss of prestige, the Raja's terms if met, including lifting the blockade of ports by the Dutch, could weaken their position against the insurgents.

During 1884 the men continued to make the best of their plight whilst the Pegasus with William Edward Maxwell, Colonial Secretary of the Straits Settlements, on board provided assistance to the men by sending food, parcels and letters. Eventually, in September, after ten months in captivity, the Raja relented, it is said due to the influence of his mother who 'laid down the law pretty swiftly to the Raja about having our case brought to a close.'

When the 19 captives were released they met Captain Bickford and Maxwell on the beach, and were taken aboard the Pegasus whilst Maxwell handed over the ransom money to the Raja, said by Bradley in his account to be 40,000 Straits Dollars and open ports. They sailed for Penang where they attended the General Hospital, and on 22 September 1884 they joined the Ajax, a cargo ship bound for Liverpool.

== Aftermath ==
Maxwell was congratulated by the Governor of the Straits Settlements, Frederick Weld, who wrote to him: “In 1884 I sent you on a special and most difficult mission to Acheen, with my instructions in the Nisero case. You showed great tact, ability; and courage, and in the end, after I returned to England, you were successful.”' Maxwell and Bickford received the Companion of the Most Distinguished Order of St. Michael and St. George (CMG) in 1885 for his role but the details of the release were never officially published.
