= List of international presidential trips made by Rodrigo Paz =

This is a list of international presidential trips made by Rodrigo Paz, the 68th and current President of Bolivia since 8 November 2025.

== Summary ==
The number of visits per country where President Paz traveled are:

- One visit to Brazil, Chile, Panama, Peru, Spain, Turkey
- Two visits to Paraguay and the United States

== 2026 ==
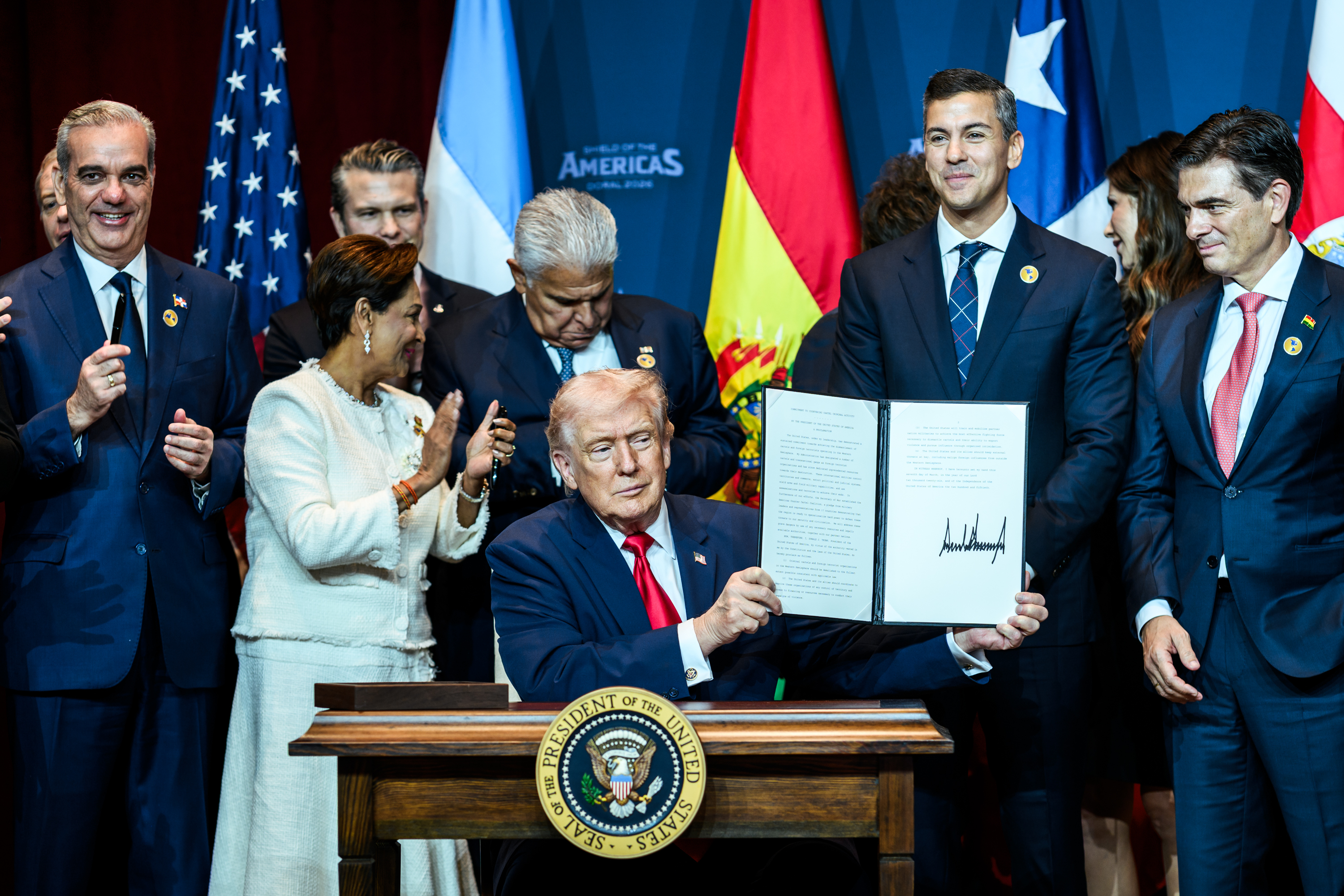
Paz (far right) at the signing ceremony of the Shield of the Americas Summit, 7 March 2026

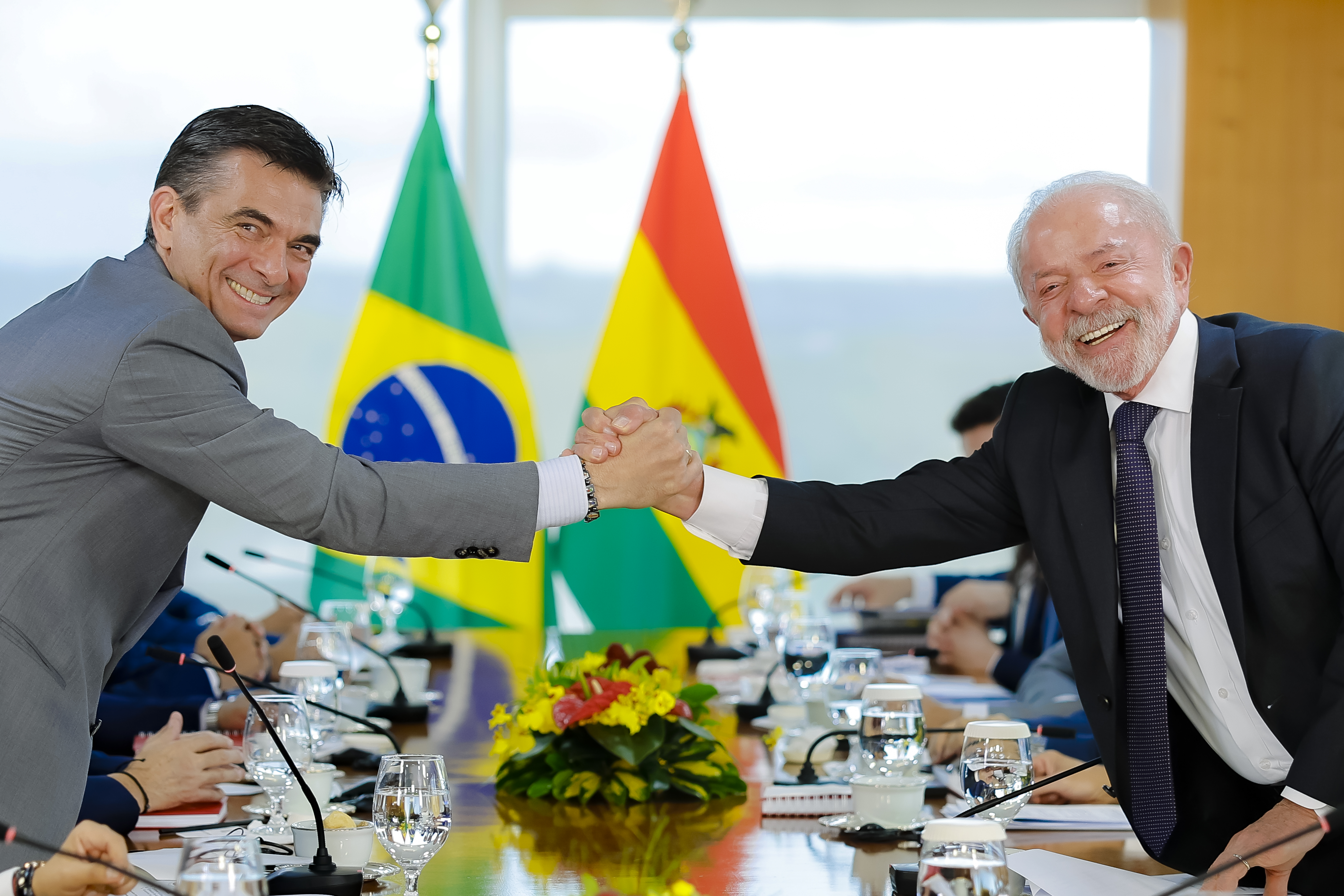
Paz with Brazilian President Luiz Inácio Lula da Silva, 13 March 2026

| Country | Areas visited | Date(s) | Notes |
|---|---|---|---|
| Paraguay | Asunción | 17 January | Attended the signing ceremony of the EU–Mercosur Partnership Agreement. |
| Panama | Panama City | 27–28 January | Attended the Latin America and Caribbean Economic Forum. |
| United States | Doral | 7 March | Attended the inaugural summit of the Shield of the Americas. |
| Chile | Valparaíso | 11 March | Attended the inauguration ceremony of President José Antonio Kast. |
| Brazil | Brasília | 16–17 March | Official visit. Met with President Luiz Inácio Lula da Silva. |
| Paraguay | Luque | 30 June | Attended the Mercosur summit. |
| Peru | Lima | 28 July | Attended the inauguration ceremony of President Keiko Fujimori. |
| United States | New York City | 19–27 September | Participated in the 81st session of the UN General Assembly. |
| Spain | Madrid | 2–6 November | Attended the 30th Ibero-American Summit and met with King Felipe VI. |
| Turkey | Antalya, Istanbul | 10–15 November | Attended the COP31 climate summit in Antalya and met with President Recep Tayyip Erdoğan in Istanbul. |
