= List of international presidential trips made by Nasry Asfura =

This is a list of international presidential trips made by Nasry Asfura, the 40th and current President of Honduras since 27 January 2026. According to the country's Constitution, during President Asfura's absence, one of the three vice presidents serves as acting president.

== Summary ==
The number of visits per country where President Asfura traveled are:

- One visit to Colombia, Costa Rica, Germany, Italy, Panama, Spain, Ukraine, Vatican City
- Five visits to the United States

== 2026 ==
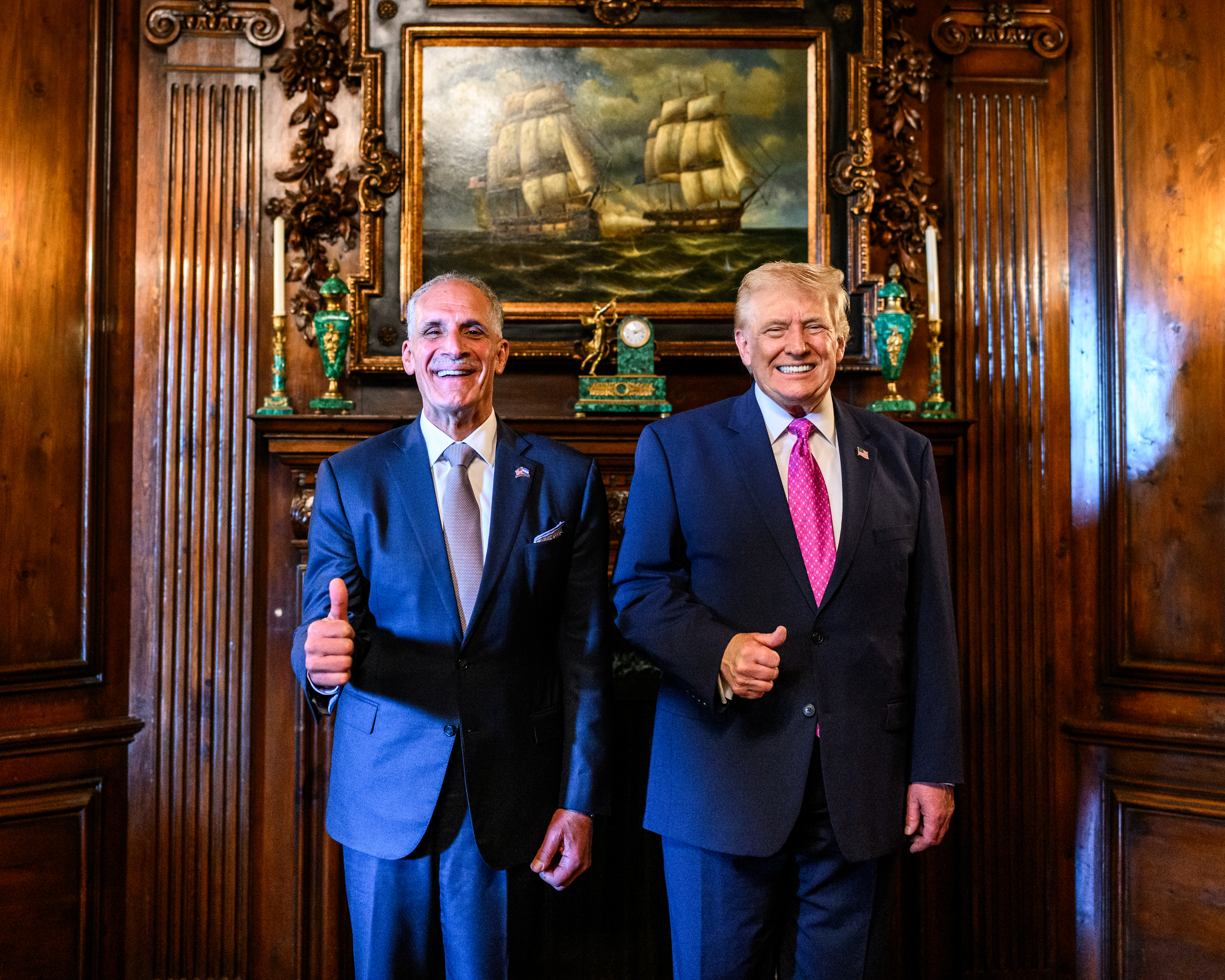
Asfura with US President Donald Trump in February 2026

Asfura with various other leaders at the Shield of the Americas Summit in Florida, March 2026

No.	Country	Areas visited	Date(s)	Notes
1	United States	Palm Beach	7–8 February	Private working visit. Met with President Donald Trump at Mar-a-Lago. Discussed security cooperation, migration, trade, and bilateral relations.
2	United States	Washington, D.C., Miami	4–8 March	Working visit. Signed Honduras’s re-entry into the International Centre for Settlement of Investment Disputes (ICSID/CIADI) at the World Bank in Washington. Attended the Shield of the Americas Summit of Latin American leaders hosted by President Donald Trump in Miami.
3	United States	Los Angeles	4–6 May	Participated in an investor forum organized by the Milken Institute. Aimed at attracting foreign investment to Honduras.
3	Costa Rica	San José	7–8 May	Attended the inauguration ceremony of Laura Fernández Delgado.
4	Germany	Berlin	18–19 June	Participated in the Second Berlin Climate Mobility Forum (BCMF 2026). Held meetings with German business representatives, including the German Chamber of Industry and Commerce (DIHK).
4	Ukraine	Kyiv	19–20 June	Official visit. Met with President Volodymyr Zelenskyy. Laid a wreath at the Wall of the Fallen. Discussed cooperation in agricultural technology, drones, digitalization, higher education, and infrastructure. First official visit by a Honduran president to Ukraine since its independence. Signed a memorandum establishing a political consultations mechanism and a Honduras–Ukraine Roadmap 2026–2030.
5	Panama	Panama City	21–23 June	Participated in the 56th General Assembly of the Organization of American States (OAS) and related diplomatic events, including the Congreso Anfictiónico.
6	Colombia	Cali	6–8 August	Attended the inauguration ceremony of Abelardo de la Espriella. Held a bilateral meeting with President Luis Abinader of the Dominican Republic.
7	United States	New York City	19–24 September	Participated in the 81st session of the UN General Assembly. Accompanied by Foreign Minister Mireya Agüero. Met with UN Secretary-General António Guterres, discussing sustainable development, anti-corruption efforts, and the effects of El Niño on Honduras. Took part in the "Shield of the Americas" meeting with other regional leaders on security, economic, and regional cooperation.
8	Italy	Rome	20 October	Official visit. Scheduled to be received by President Sergio Mattarella at the Quirinal Palace. Also scheduled to hold meetings with representatives of the Food and Agriculture Organization, meet private-sector investors from northern Italy, and meet members of the Honduran community in Italy. Accompanied by Foreign Minister Mireya Agüero.
8	Vatican City	Vatican City	20 October	Scheduled to meet Secretary of State Cardinal Pietro Parolin and sign a bilateral agreement between Honduras and the Holy See.
9	Spain	Madrid	4–5 November	Attended the 30th Ibero-American Summit of Heads of State and Government. Honduras assumed the pro tempore presidency of the Ibero-American community for 2026–2028 and will host the 31st summit in 2028.
10	United States	Washington, D.C.	12–15 November	Working visit. Met with Secretary of State Marco Rubio to discuss drug trafficking, organized crime and the Shield of the Americas initiative. Met with Inter-American Development Bank president Ilan Goldfajn to discuss energy reform, road connectivity, infrastructure and education. Held meetings with representatives of the International Monetary Fund regarding a new program for Honduras. Took part in the Consejo de Empresarios de América Latina (CEAL) to promote investment in Honduras.

== Multilateral meetings ==
Multilateral meetings of the following intergovernmental organizations took place during Nasry Asfura's presidency (2026–present).

Group	Year
Group	2026
OAS General Assembly	21–23 June; Panama City
UNGA	22–28 September (United States) New York City
Ibero-American Summit	4–5 November (Spain) Madrid

== See also ==
- Foreign relations of Honduras
- List of international presidential trips made by Xiomara Castro, his predecessor
