= Joint Task Force Western Hemisphere =

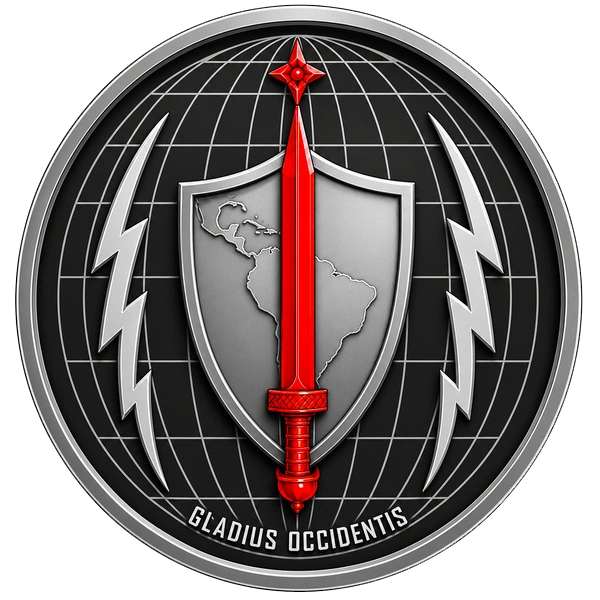
- Active: 4 August 2026–present
- Country: United States
- Type: Joint task force; Unified command
- Role: Disaster response; Humanitarian assistance; ISTAR; Operational planning
- Part of: United States Southern Command (Americas Counter Cartel Coalition)
- Motto: Gladius Occidentis (Sword of the West)

Commanders
- Current commander: MG Kevin Jarrard

Joint Task Force Western Hemisphere (JTF-WHEM) is a joint task force of U.S. Southern Command (SOUTHCOM) established on August 4, 2026. It acts as a rapid reaction force in the Western Hemisphere and partners with other security agencies of the Shield of the Americas. The first commander was announced as Major General Kevin Jarrard, USMC.

The JTF-WHEM was created in response to the Trump administration's "Donroe Doctrine" which is a pivot away from the war on terror and towards the "near-abroad" or the Western Hemisphere. JTF-WHEM will take over the mission started by Operation Southern Spear. Their missions will include anti-narcotics operations, humanitarian relief and impeding transnational criminal organizations.

JTF-WHEM inherits the legacy of Operation Southern Spear including the, United States military buildup in the Caribbean, the United States strikes on alleged drug traffickers, the 2026 United States fuel blockade on Cuba, 2026 United States intervention in Venezuela including the capture of Nicolas Maduro and his wife Cilia Flores, the United States bombing of Comandos de la Frontera in Ecuador, and the bombing of Niño Guerrero.

== Possible expansion into other Latin American nations ==
On August 12, while visiting Panama, United States secretary of defense Pete Hegseth proclaimed that the United States has made a military agreement with Colombia, Guatemala and Honduras to combat criminal drug organizations. Hegseth added that like the attacks on boats that the U.S. had been conducting in the East Pacific and the Caribbean, the attacks on drug traffickers on land would be the same. In addition, Hegseth stated that the U.S. would continue to pursue military cooperation with Ecuador. However, Guatemala later publicly repudiated Hegseth's claims.

== U.S. military training for future operations ==
On August 13, SOUTHCOM showcased its training of United States Military and Panamaian Military personal training for jungle warfare for future anti-narcotics missions, at Base Aeronaval Cristóbal Colón.

== See also ==
- Ecuadorian conflict (2024–present)
- Gunboat diplomacy
- Joint Interagency Task Force-Counter Cartel
- War on drugs
