= Operation Southern Spear =

Ongoing US military anti-drug trafficking campaign since 2025

- Part of the crisis in Venezuela, the war on cartels and the war on terror
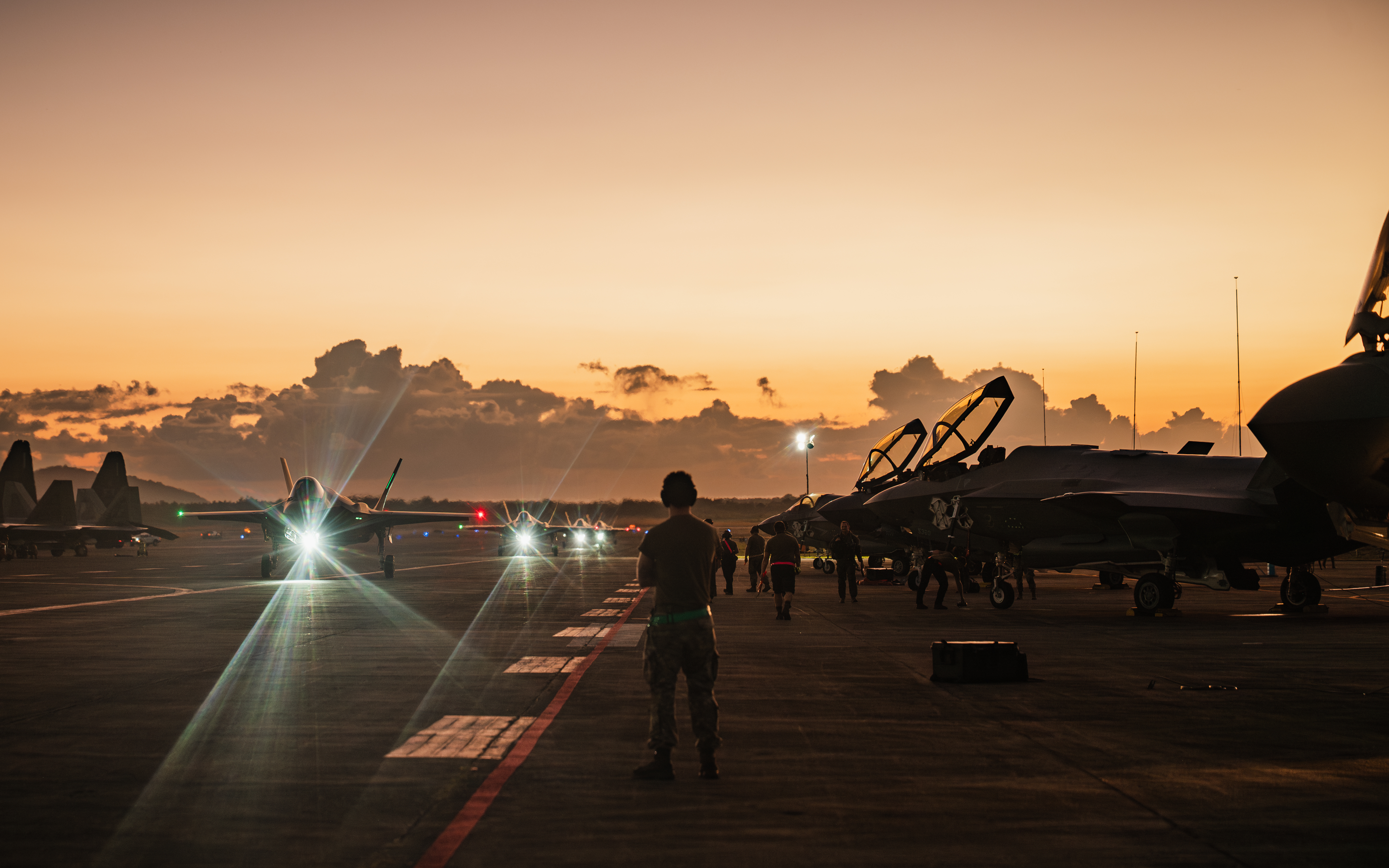
- US F-35A jets at Roosevelt Roads Naval Station following the operation that captured Venezuelan president, Nicolás Maduro, 3 January 2026
Date	1 September 2025 – present (1 year, 2 months and 21 days)
Location	Caribbean Sea, Pacific Ocean, Venezuela, Ecuador
Status	Ongoing: US military buildup in the Caribbean; US airstrikes on vessel and land targets since 1 September 2025; US oil blockade of Venezuela since 10 December 2025; US intervention in Venezuela; 2026 Cuban crisis; Military operation launched in Ecuador in March 2026; Killing of Niño Guerrero on 12 June 2026 by airstrike during a joint assassination operation by Venezuela and the United States

Belligerents
Shield of the Americas: (Note: Since March 7, 2026.): United States; Argentina; Dominican Republic; Ecuador; Trinidad and Tobago; El Salvador; Colombia (since August 2026); (Venezuela) Venezuelan opposition; United Kingdom; Venezuela (Note: Killing of Niño Guerrero only. While not a part of the Shield of the Americas, the post-Maduro government under Delcy Rodríguez has been forced to cooperate with the United States.) (after Operation Absolute Resolve, disputed)	ALBA-TCP: Venezuela; Cartel of the Suns (alleged by the US); Cuba; Colombia (alleged by the US, until August 2026); Alleged drug traffickers; Tren de Aragua; UC-ELN (alleged by the US); FARC dissidents (including Comandos de la Frontera) (alleged by the US and Ecuador)

Commanders and leaders
(United States) Donald Trump; (United States) Marco Rubio; (United States) Pete Hegseth; (United States) Dan Caine; (Venezuela) María Corina Machado; (Dominican Republic) Luis Abinader; (Trinidad and Tobago) Kamla Persad-Bissessar; Delcy Rodríguez (disputed) (Note: While a successor of Nicolás Maduro, acting president Rodríguez was forced to cooperate with the United States after Operation Absolute Resolve)	Nicolás Maduro (POW); Delcy Rodríguez (Note: While a successor of Nicolás Maduro, acting president Rodríguez was forced to cooperate with the United States after Operation Absolute Resolve); Vladimir Padrino; Diosdado Cabello; Niño Guerrero X

Units involved
United States Southern Command (SOUTHCOM); US Navy; Fourth Fleet; US Marine Corps; 22nd MEU (SOC) 2D Low Altitude Air Defense Battalion; US Army; 1st SFOD-D; 160th SOAR(A); US Air Force; US Coast Guard; MSRT; US Department of Justice; FBI; Hostage Rescue Team; DEA; Puerto Rico National Guard; CIA	Bolivarian National Armed Forces (Venezuela); Bolivarian Army of Venezuela; 31st Mechanised Infantry Brigade; 312th Ayala Battalion; 392nd Portable Air Defense Missile Group; 397th Portable Air Defence Missile Group; 398th Portable Air Defence Missile Group; Presidential Honor Guard; 3rd Custodian Battalion; 6th Security Battalion; Bolivarian Militia of Venezuela; Strategic Operations Command; Support & Service Battalion; Bolivarian Navy of Venezuela; Venezuelan Marine Corps; Simón Bolívar Internationalist Brigades; Cuban Revolutionary Armed Forces

Strength
~15,000 troops 1 carrier strike group, 6 destroyers, 1 amphibious assault ship, 2 amphibious transport docks, 1 guided missile cruiser, 1 national security cutter, 1 nuclear-powered attack submarine, 150+ aircraft (Note: Including fixed wing aircraft (Lockheed Martin F-22A Raptor, Lockheed Martin F-35A/C Lightning II, Boeing F/A-18E/F Super Hornet, Boeing EA-18G Growler, Grumman E-2D Hawkeye, Rockwell B-1B Lancer) and helicopters (Boeing CH-47F and MH-47G Chinooks, Sikorsky CH-53E Super Stallion, Sikorsky CH-53K King Stallion, Bell UH-1Y Venom, Bell AH-1Z Viper, Boeing AH-64E Apache, Boeing MH-6M Little Bird, Sikorsky UH-60M Black Hawk and MH-60M DAP), other support aircraft, and numerous unmanned aerial vehicles (including the Lockheed Martin RQ-170 Sentinel))	200,000 troops 4,500,000 militia (Venezuelan claim); 22,000–25,000 medics and military personnel (2019 estimate)

Casualties and losses
(United States) 1 killed (non-combat) Operation Absolute Resolve: (United States) 7 wounded (United States) 1 helicopter damaged	243 killed in strikes on small vessels, and 3 captured in strikes on vessels 10 oil tankers boarded or seized Several allegedly killed including Niño Guerrero in land strikes in Venezuela and Ecuador Operation Absolute Resolve: 2 captured 2 civilians and at least 23 military personnel killed 32 Cubans killed One Piper PA-31 Navajo destroyed Four Buk-M2E destroyed (Note: two at Higuerote, one at La Carlota and one at La Guira) and several damaged Several Dragoon 300 and Lynx destroyed/damaged

Operation Southern Spear is a United States military and surveillance campaign launched in 2025 by the administration of US president Donald Trump with the declared aims of "detecting, disrupting, and degrading transnational criminal and illicit maritime networks". Some analysts say the operation is a hybridization of the war on terror and the war on drugs. Others have said that removal of Nicolás Maduro from power in Venezuela was an objective of the operation.

In mid-August 2025, the US began deploying military forces to the Caribbean Sea, amid heightened tensions between the US and Venezuela during the crisis in Venezuela and as the Trump administration sought to slow the flow of illicit drugs. In September, the U.S. military began conducting airstrikes on vessels the Trump administration alleged were controlled by narco-terrorists. By late November, with the Cartel of the Suns designated by the US as a Foreign Terrorist Organization and a Specially Designated Global Terrorist organization, a new phase of operations began. In December, the Trump administration declared the Maduro government a Foreign Terrorist Organization, and began boarding and seizing sanctioned crude tankers. In late December, the US made its first strike on a land target within Venezuela. On 3 January 2026, the US bombed targets in Caracas and other locations, and captured Maduro and flew him out of the country.

Later in January, NPR reported that "drug-seizure data suggest that the attacks are doing little to stop the flow of illegal narcotics into the United States."

On 6 March 2026, the operation expanded to Ecuador when U.S. forces bombed Comandos de la Frontera as part of the Ecuadorian conflict (2024–present).

The campaign was formally named on 13 November 2025 by Pete Hegseth, US secretary of defense, as an expansion of an operation bearing the same name announced by the United States Navy on 28 January 2025. It uses a hybrid fleet of vessels with robotics and autonomous systems to detect and combat alleged drug trafficking networks in the Western Hemisphere.

According to an assessment by the Drug Enforcement Administration (DEA), the military strikes against suspected drug-trafficking vessels did not reduce the volume of cocaine entering the United States. Instead, the operations forced criminal organizations to change their smuggling techniques and at the same time eroded traditional law enforcement investigative techniques.

== Origins and history ==
The United States Navy announced an operation by the same name in January 2025, using the Navy's Fourth Fleet, focused on integrating "robotic and autonomous systems with traditional naval forces". According to the Miami Herald, Foster Edwards, the 4th Fleet's Hybrid Fleet Director, "described Southern Spear as a significant step in the Navy's evolving Hybrid Fleet Campaign" that would "operationalize a heterogeneous mix of Robotic and Autonomous Systems to support the detection and monitoring of illicit trafficking while learning lessons for other theaters" and "help develop critical techniques and procedures for integrating RAS into the maritime environment." The Operation would use unmanned surface vessels supplied by Saildrone "to monitor illegal activity in the Caribbean and Pacific Ocean", according to Axios. Uncrewed boats for high-risk missions were being used to gather intelligence by June 2025.

The United States Southern Command (USSOUTHCOM), whose area of responsibility covers Central and South America and the Caribbean, created a joint task force in October 2025 around the headquarters of II Marine Expeditionary Force (II MEF) tasked with "crushing" the drug cartels operating in the region. Later referred to as the Joint Task Force Southern Spear, its operations are coordinated with the 4th Fleet, the US Navy's component of USSOUTHCOM.

According to The Hill, after the Navy's 4th Fleet Operation Southern Spear envisioned "deploying robotic surface vessels, small robotic interceptor boats and vertical take-off and landing robotic air vessels to the Southcom region", in November 2025, Hegseth formally unveiled the Joint Task Force Operation Southern Spear, "made up of ground, air and logistics troops, to 'synchronize and augment counter-narcotics efforts across the Western Hemisphere'." The campaign was formally named on 13 November 2025 by Hegseth on orders from Trump, bearing the same name as the operation announced by the Navy on 28 January 2025. The Joint Task Force headquarters are at Naval Station Mayport in Florida, with operations to begin later in November.

The New York Times described the Chairman of the US Joint Chiefs of Staff, Dan Caine, as a "major architect" of the operation.

On 6 August 2026, U.S. Southern Command announced the creation Joint Task Force Western Hemisphere (JTF-WHEM) which will replace Operation Southern Spear. It will be a unified command of the 18 partner nations of the Americas Counter Cartel Coalition (A3C). Marine Corps Maj. Gen. Kevin Jarrard will command the task force.

== Terrorist and other designations ==
Three days after Hegseth unveiled Operation Southern Spear, Marco Rubio, the US Secretary of State, announced the US would designate Cartel of the Suns—which the US alleges is headed by Venezuelan president Nicolás Maduro—as a Foreign Terrorist Organization. Rubio stated that cartels are "responsible for terrorist violence throughout our hemisphere as well as for trafficking drugs into the United States and Europe"; Maduro denies the US allegation that he is "complicit with armed criminal gangs that smuggle drugs" to the US. The Miami Herald wrote: "The designation would effectively label Maduro and senior officials, including Interior Minister Diosdado Cabello and Defense Minister Vladimir Padrino López, as terrorists."

The US listed the Gulf Clan (Clan del Golfo), described by The Guardian as "Colombia's largest and most powerful illegal armed criminal group" as a Foreign Terrorist Organization on 16 December 2025.

On 15 December 2025, Trump signed an executive order designating fentanyl as a weapon of mass destruction. Two days later, Trump stated he would designate the "Maduro regime" a Foreign Terrorist Organization.

== Campaign ==
=== Strikes on alleged drug traffickers ===
The US began deploying troops to the Caribbean in mid-August. By late November 2025, the US had amassed the largest military presence in the region since the Cuban Missile Crisis in October 1962, and was striking and sinking vessels allegedly operated by drug traffickers in the Caribbean and Eastern Pacific. A US official told a reporter that Hegseth's 13 November unveiling was "a formal operation naming for what the Joint Task Force Southern Spear ... and Southcom have already been doing in theater".

Within days of the unveiling of the operation, cocaine-smuggling boats were captured in joint operations between the Dominican Republic and the US.

As of September 2026, at least 234 people had been killed in the operation. Experts, human rights groups and international organizations including the United Nations have said the killings violate US and international law. In September 2026, UN Special Rapporteur on human rights and counterterrorism Ben Saul concluded that there were "reasonable grounds to believe that the reported 68 attacks that killed 223 people constituted crimes against humanity of murder under customary international law." The report rejected the U.S. claim of self-defence, finding that drug trafficking does not meet the threshold of an "armed attack" and that less-lethal alternatives such as maritime interception were available.

=== Venezuela intervention ===
Several US B-52 Stratofortress long-range bombers flew from Minot Air Force Base in North Dakota within several miles of the coast of Venezuela on 20 November in what SOUTHCOM described as a "bomber attack demo".

On 22 November, senior Trump administration officials told Reuters that the US was prepared to launch a new phase of operations against Venezuela. Dan Caine visited Puerto Rico as the "Trump Administration weigh[ed] the possibility of a broader military campaign against Venezuela". According to The New York Times, he was "expected to consult with commanders"; sources said that Trump had approved covert CIA activity in Venezuela, and authorized additional negotiations with Maduro, but had not yet authorized the use of land forces.

The US began seizing, intercepting or pursuing tankers transporting Venezuelan oil on 11 December, and on 17 December, Trump ordered a "blockade" of sanctioned oil tankers heading to and from Venezuela.

The first strike on a land target in Venezuela was announced by Trump on 26 December 2025—a marine facility the US said had been used for loading drug boats had been hit in a drone strike by the CIA, with no casualties, likely on 24 December.

On 3 January 2026, explosions and low-flying aircraft were reported in Caracas and other locations and Maduro was captured in Operation Absolute Resolve by the US.

After the operation, Delcy Rodríguez was sworn in as President of Venezuela.

=== Ecuador intervention ===
On 6 March 2026, the Operation was expanded militarily in Ecuador when the United States participated in bombing Comandos de la Frontera, during the Ecuadorian conflict (2024–present).

=== Possible expansion into other Latin American nations ===
In August of 2026, while visiting Panama, Hegseth proclaimed that the United States has made a military agreement with Colombia, Guatemala and Honduras to combat criminal drug organizations. Hegseth added that like the attacks on boats that the U.S. had been conducting in the East Pacific and the Caribbean, the attacks on drug traffickers on land would be the same. In addition, Hegseth stated that the U.S. would continue to pursue military cooperation with Ecuador. However, Guatemala later publicly repudiated Hegseth's claims.

== Participation and logistics support ==
=== Allied with US ===
Operation Southern Spear, 2025–2026

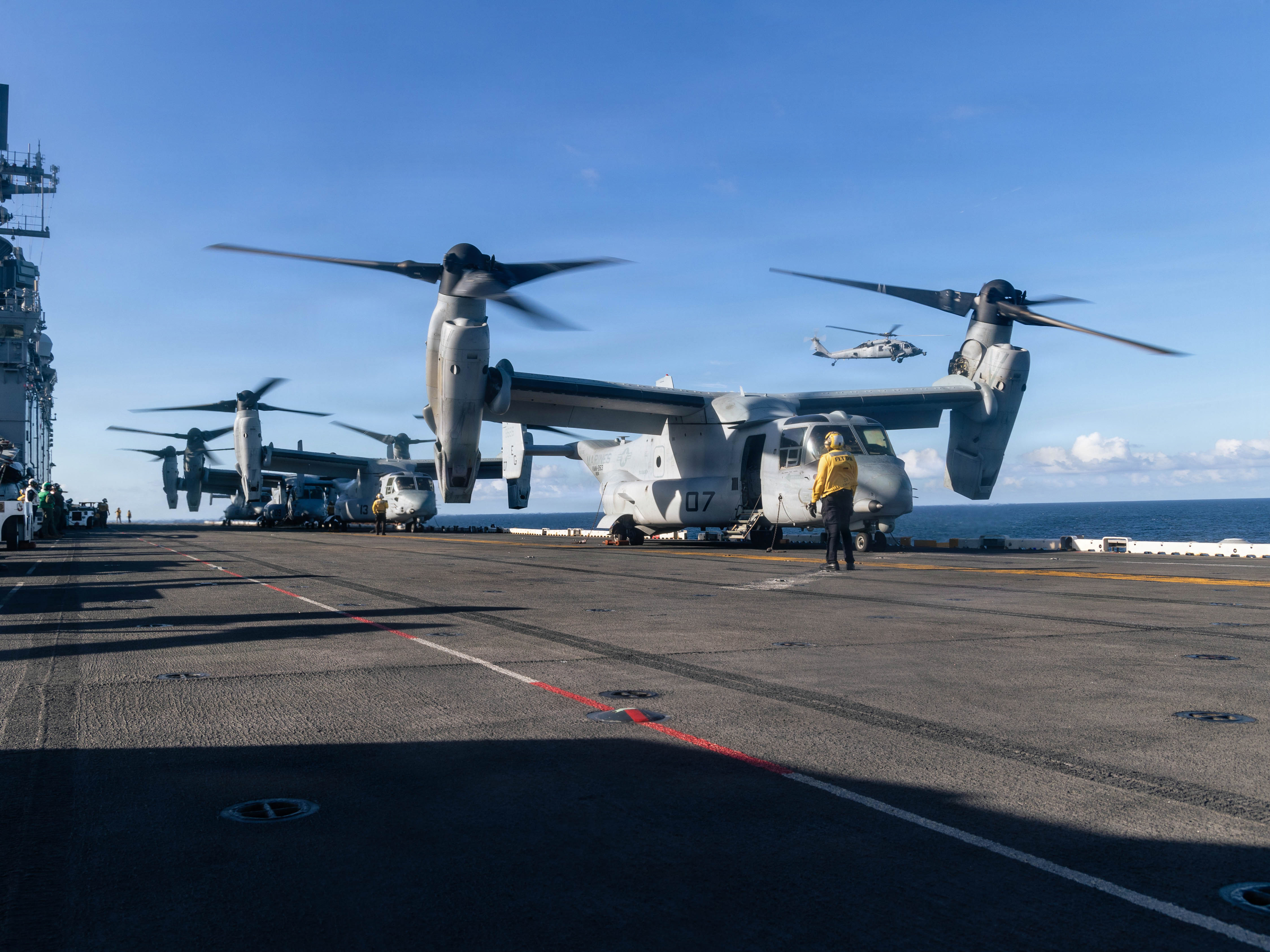
MV-22B Ospreys with VMM-263, 22nd MEU, aboard the USS Iwo Jima (2025)

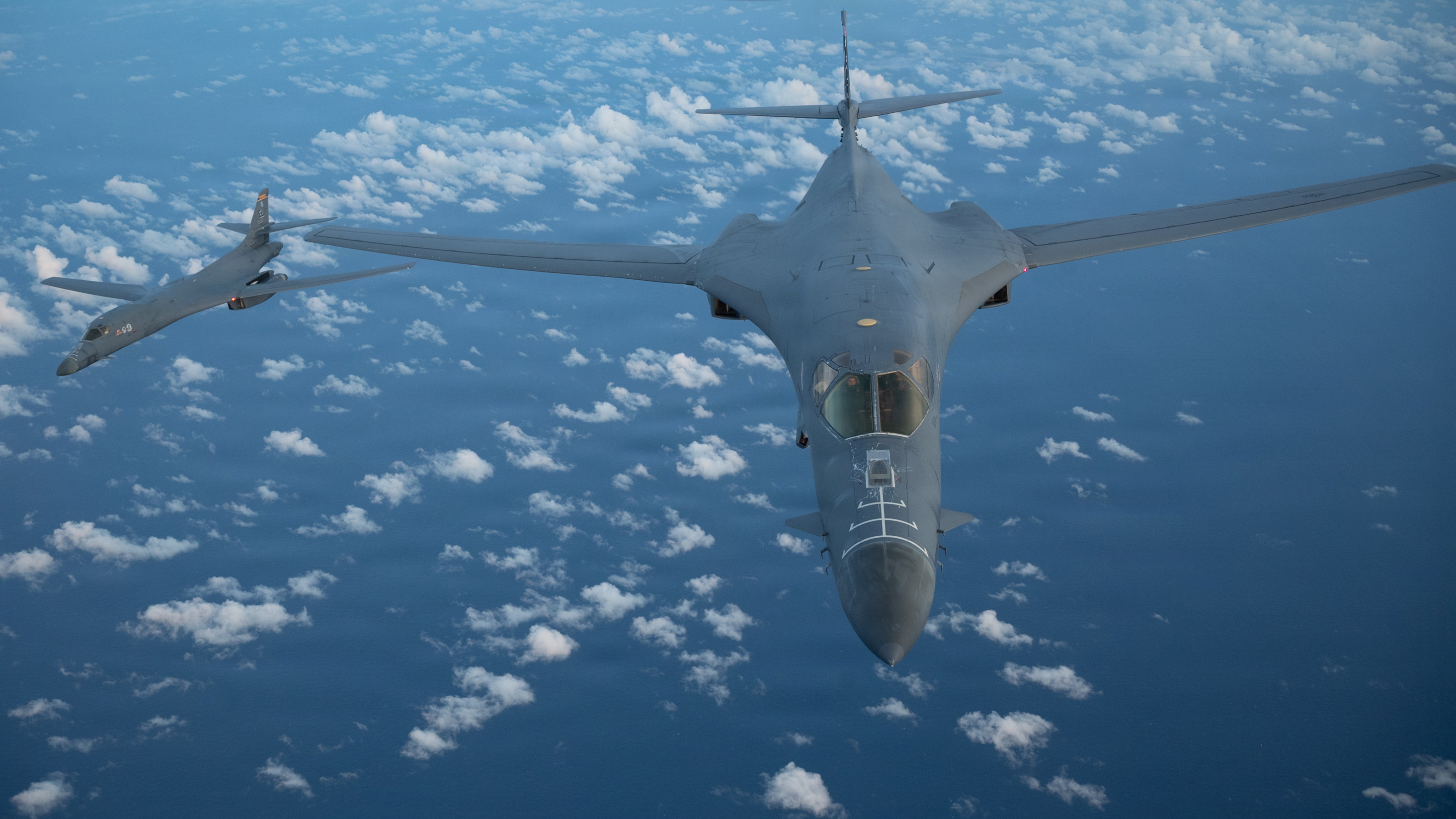
Two US Air Force B-1B Lancer bombers fly in formation (2025).

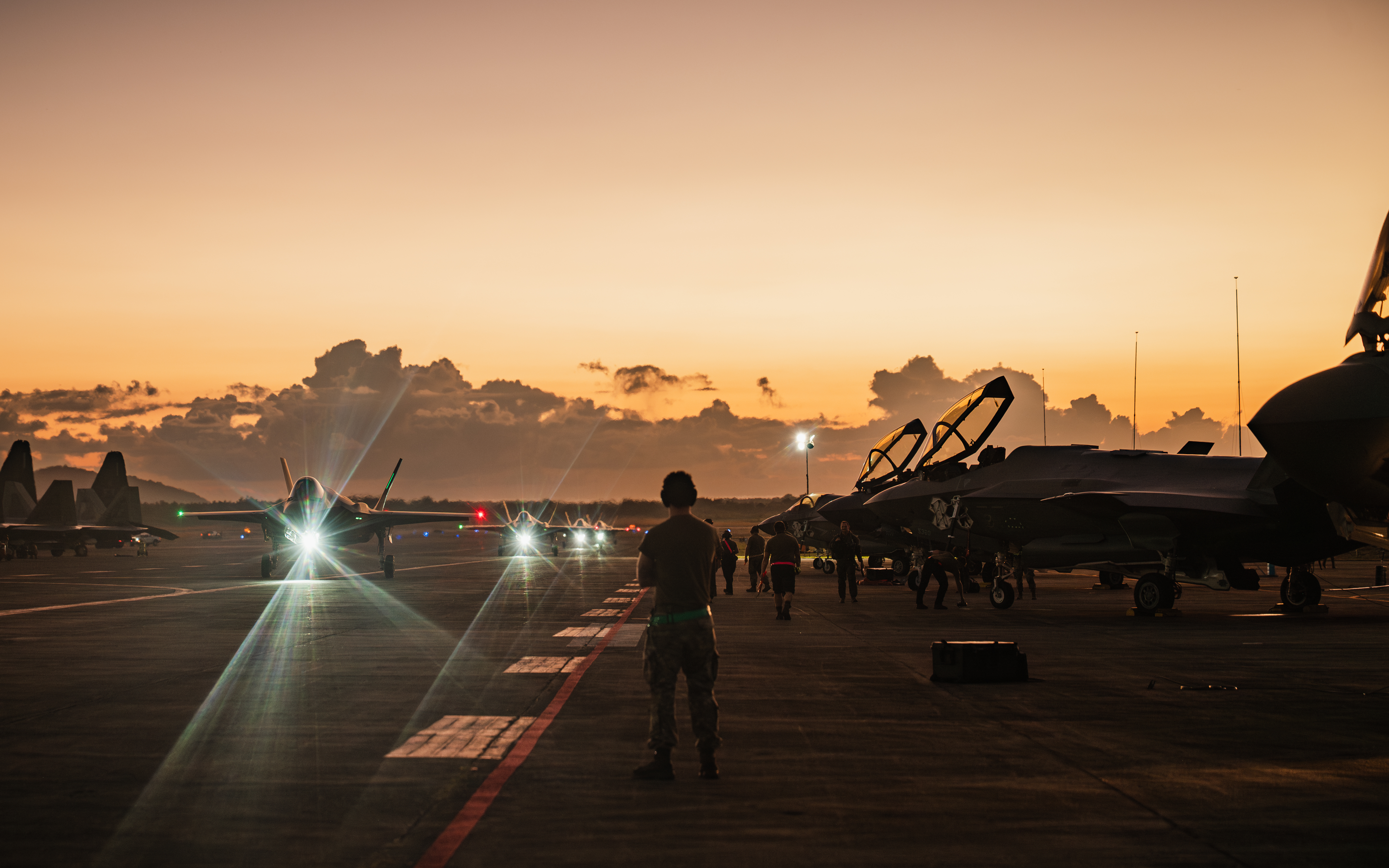
F-35A Lightning IIs at Roosevelt Roads Naval Station (2026)

In addition to Trinidad and Tobago, on 19 November, CNN described the Dominican Republic, El Salvador, Guyana, and Panama as supportive of the US military effort, and Argentina, Ecuador, and Paraguay as having "shown political support". The United Kingdom stated they provided logistical support to the US forces in apprehending a sanctioned vessel.

==== Dominican Republic ====
Collaborative efforts between the Dominican Republic and US anti-drug agencies have been conducted, recovering numerous packages of cocaine. On 26 November, during a meeting with Hegseth, Dominican president Luis Abinader granted the US temporary authorization to use San Isidro Air Base and the Las Americas International Airport for its counter-narcotics operations.

By mid-December, the US had moved more specialized military assets to Puerto Rico and the Dominican Republic that would support targeted land strikes, seizures of oil tankers or enforcement of an oil embargo. TheWarZone.com described the addition of refueling and search and rescue aircraft as "moving into a posture ... for tactical air combat operations over hostile territory"; the deployment of EA–18G Growlers as "indicative of what one would see in the lead-up to a kinetic operation centered heavily on strikes on targets in inland areas" with "electronic warfare support for platforms launching standoff attacks or penetrating through enemy air defenses"; and deployment of F-35s as preparing for airstrikes "on targets deep inside Venezuelan airspace".

==== El Salvador ====
According to a visual investigation report by The New York Times, satellite imagery and other data revealed the US began operating aircraft out of El Salvador in mid-October; the three aircraft identified included the Air Force's AC-130J Ghostrider, which is "designed to destroy targets on the ground or at sea using missiles or barrages from its cannons and machine guns" along with a P8–A Poseidon operated by the Navy, and a C-40 Clipper, about which little is known. The report stated that "the deployment ... is likely to be the first time a foreign country has hosted US planes that may be involved in military strikes in the region". According to The War Zone, the P-8 is the "most advanced maritime patrol aircraft in the world and is specifically capable of collecting multiple types of intelligence to find small targets in vast bodies of water".

==== Trinidad and Tobago ====
The destroyer Gravely arrived on 26 October 2025 to spend four days in Trinidad and Tobago, where their country's forces would jointly train with US Marines. Trinidad and Tobago announced additional joint training drills with US Marines in November.

Caine would travel to Trinidad and Tobago after the November 2025 Puerto Rico visit to meet with Trinidad and Tobago Prime Minister Kamla Persad-Bissessar; the Caribbean National Weekly stated that the visit came "as the two nations deepen their security collaboration to strengthen regional stability and combat illicit trafficking and transnational criminal organizations".

In late November, the US installed a radar system in the island nation, which is useful for aerial surveillance. In December, Trinidad and Tobago approved military aircraft from the US to use the country's airports for operations that are "logistical in nature, facilitating supply replenishment and routing personnel rotations", according to its foreign ministry.

==== United Kingdom ====
The Royal Air Force (RAF) provided surveillance and reconnaissance support, with an RAF surveillance plane tracked over the area where a Russian-linked tanker, Bella 1, was seized by US forces in January 2026.

The UK provided one of its largest naval supply ships, the RFA Tideforce to support the US seizure of Bella 1 (renamed Marinera) in the North Atlantic, and UK military bases in the Atlantic were used by US planes and military assets involved in the operation.

=== Allied with Venezuela ===
The Washington Post wrote in October that Maduro had written to Russia's Vladimir Putin, asking for help with "defensive radars, military aircraft repairs and potentially missiles", and that Maduro had contacted "China and Iran, soliciting military assistance and equipment to strengthen the country's defenses". According to The Wall Street Journal, China and Russia are "Maduro's two most powerful allies" and they have "previously provided military equipment, maintenance and training, say analysts, along with economic assistance", but along with Maduro's other traditional allies of Cuba and Iran, they are unlikely to lend significant support help beyond words of support.

==== Cuba ====
Cuba has contributed security and counterintelligence to Venezuela's Maduro since before the US military buildup; that support has expanded during the buildup to include more bodyguards, security and counterintelligence officers, who are considered less likely to rise against Maduro. The government of Cuba said 32 citizens were killed engaging in "direct combat" in Venezuela during the 3 January capture of Maduro.

==== China ====
China has historically supported the Maduro government with financial and military assistance, and most of Venezuela's oil exports go to China. Analysts state that its relationship with China is significant for Venezuela, but China had "stepped back" in new lending, was frustrated by corruption in Venezuela, and unlikely to lend considerable military support in the face of its own problems with the US.

==== Iran ====
Iran has provided technical assistance to Venezuela's oil industry during the crisis in Venezuela, but is considered weakened by internal issues with limited ability to support abroad, according to The New York Times.

==== Russia ====
On 26 October, a Russian Il-76 transport aircraft under US sanctions landed in Venezuela "after a circuitous route over Africa to avoid Western airspace, according to Flightradar24". The aircraft carried Pantsir-S1 and Buk-M2E air defense systems, according to a Russian official.

=== Others ===
In December 2025, Maduro asked Colombian society, including Colombia's army, to join in defending against any aggression from the US. Gustavo Petro, the president of Colombia, denied the request, stating that no one can order Colombia's armed forces, and later adding that Maduro was a dictator but not a narco-trafficker. Petro has called for a negotiated settlement.

== Analysis ==
Some analysts have identified this operation as a hybridization of the war on terror and the war on drugs.

According to Pino Arlacchi, the former head of the UN Office on Drugs and Crime, the portrayal of Venezuela as a "drug state" is a "geopolitically motivated smear campaign" by the US government; he refers to the World Drug Report 2025 and his own experience, according to which the Venezuelan government's cooperation in the fight against drug trafficking is among the best in South America. According to Arlacchi, the US has taken an interest in Venezuelan oil reserves, which are among the largest in the world.

An article published in December 2025 by the Council on Foreign Relations stated that some experts believe that the "scope and intensity" of the Operation indicate that the Trump administrations's goals extend beyond combatting drug trafficking to a "broader plan to oust Maduro".

An analysis by the Costs of War Project estimated that Operation Southern Spear and Operation Absolute Resolve, from 1 August 2025 to 31 March 2026, cost at least $4.7 billion in government funds.

== Reactions ==
Foreign Policy magazine stated that a poll of Latin Americans living across the Americas, including the US and Canada, in October 2025 showed "fairly strong levels of support among people in the region for a US military intervention in Venezuela to depose Maduro and his government", adding that people in Latin America were more "likely to support such a scenario" than US respondents.

Following the 3 January 2026 capture of Nicolás Maduro by the United States military, protests occurred in several cities. In Chicago, Washington DC, and Times Square in New York City, people rallied to protest the United States’ intervention in Venezuela, claiming it was “about stealing oil and dominating Latin America.” Protesters labelled the Trump Administration’s use of military force in Venezuela without Congressional support illegal, saying the attacks were “an act of imperialism that Americans did not vote for.” The activist group that organized the Times Square protest was the ANSWER Coalition, a national anti-war and anti-racism social movement that called for a cease of US bombings and attacks on Venezuela. Zoe Alexandra of the ANSWER Coalition stated, "As people of the United States, we have to oppose this action because what's stopping Trump from doing this to other countries?"

At the same time in Queens, New York, a group of people organized in support of the Trump Administration’s actions, celebrating the removal of Nicolás Maduro from office. The public reactions immediately following the events of 3 January 2026 were highly divided—New York Times reports, “the U.S. military action has been polarizing, with large numbers of residents turning out in opposition, and many Venezuelan immigrants taking to the streets to rejoice.” During Maduro’s 5 January 2026 federal court arraignment, two opposing groups of activists gathered outside the courthouse building. One group consisted of anti-intervention activists protesting the US’ economic and political involvement in Latin America, while the other group consisted of Venezuelan immigrants and opposers of Maduro’s government who rallied in support of the regime change in Venezuela, chanting “Libertad!” and “It already fell; it already fell; this dictatorship already fell!”

In Venezuela, public opinion about the US’ actions in the War on cartels was also split. In late 2025, at the beginning of the United States’ War on cartels and before the capture of Nicolás Maduro, “Venezuela’s top pollster found that 23% of Venezuelans supported foreign military intervention and 55% opposed it—even as the vast majority of Venezuelans opposed Maduro himself.” Following the events of 3 January 2026, protests broke out in major cities including Caracas, Barquisimeto, Ciudad Guayana, Maracaibo and Mérida. In the largest of this series of protests, “Student demonstrators gathered on the campus of the Central University of Venezuela in Caracas on Thursday to demand the release of all of the country’s political prisoners, the return of exiled activists and a full transition to democracy.” At the same time, many citizens celebrated the country “entering a new, less authoritarian era” following the removal of Maduro from power. Many social activists who had been arrested or in hiding since the election of Maduro in 2024 participated in these rallies, including Yerwin Torrealba, an activist leader for exiled Nobel laureate María Corina Machado’s movement Vente Venezuela, and Jesús Armas, another prominent opposition leader. Although some think the volume of protests and increase in social activism in Venezuela after the United States’ capture of Nicolás Maduro point to some degree of change in the country’s authoritarian politics, Maduro’s regime remains largely the same, led by his vice president Delcy Rodríguez, and the extent to which the regime has actually changed is unclear.

== See also ==
- Gunboat diplomacy
- March–May 2025 United States attacks in Yemen
- Operation Inherent Resolve
- US intervention in Somalia (2007–present)
- Ecuadorian conflict (2024–present)
- Shield of the Americas
- Joint Interagency Task Force-Counter Cartel
