= Simón Bolívar Internationalist Brigades =

- Brigadas Internacionalistas Simón Bolívar
- Active: 24 October 2025–Present
- Country: Venezuela
- Branch: Venezuelan Armed Forces
- Type: Foreign volunteers
- Role: Infantry
- Size: Unknown
- Patron: Simón Bolívar
- Motto: Long live Maduro! Long live Venezuela! Long live the Simón Bolívar International Brigade!
- Engagements: United States–Venezuela conflict
- Website: https://www.instagram.com/brigadabolivar?igsh=MXZzbnZzOGhsODNiZw==

Commanders
- Current commander: Unknown

The Simón Bolívar Internationalist Brigades, (Spanish: Brigadas Internacionalistas Simón Bolívar) also known as the Simón Bolívar International Brigade and as the International Brigade in Defense of the Bolivarian Revolution, is a Venezuelan unit composed of foreign volunteers. According to President Nicolás Maduro, the Brigades' purpose is to defend the sovereignty of Venezuela against a potential American invasion of the country.

== History ==
=== Pre-formation ===
On 13 October 2025, Diosdado Cabello, the general secretary of the United Socialist Party of Venezuela, said during a party conference that, "Venezuela will welcome support from people around the world to help defend the country from an imminent US military aggression. If we have not publicly called for the peoples of the world to organize to defend our country, I take this opportunity to do so from this moment, that from anywhere in the world, here is Venezuela, which is being attacked, and any help you can give us is welcome. Here you will be received as brothers of life. Brothers of life. Love is repaid with love. That is what they say around here."

On 17 October 2025, João Pedro Stédile, the leader of the Brazilian Landless Workers' Movement, announced that organisations across Latin America were coordinating to send "brigades of activists to Venezuela" in a show of solidarity with the country's people. Stédile also stated that the movement seeks to "echo the historic epic" of the Spanish International Brigades that were organized by the Comintern during the Spanish Civil War. On 20 October 2025, members of Argentinian Antifa group known as "Antifascist International Argentina" staged a protest in front of a monument to Simón Bolívar in Buenos Aires. Protesters showed a message of solidarity towards Venezuela while also calling for the formation of International Brigades to support Venezuela.

=== Formation ===
The formation of the Simón Bolívar Internationalist Brigades was announced by President Nicolás Maduro on 24 October 2025. The announcement was made during a visit to the El Gran Topo Agroecological Tourist Commune in Colina Bella, Caracas, during the closing ceremony of the World Anti-Imperialist Platform. The brigades are based on the International Brigades of the Republican faction that fought in the Spanish Civil War.

The Simón Bolívar Internationalist Brigades were formed in the wake of an increased American presence in the Caribbean, with Maduro claiming that the new International Brigades will help to protect Venezuela's sovereignty and help to defend the country from an American invasion. Maduro also stated, "men and women of the world come to Venezuela to fight for "independence, sovereignty and peace".

== Composition ==
Maduro claimed that Venezuela had "received proposals from all over Latin America and the Caribbean, Asia, Africa and many other places". He also claimed, "I have seen videos on social networks, of many people, social leaders, saying that they also enlist."

On 26 December 2025, Maduro greeted and decorated Cuban members of the Brigade.

On 14 January 2026, members of the brigade paid tribute to the Father of the Nation statue in Plaza Bolívar, offering roses before the statue as a symbol of commitment to the brigade's cause. Jonathan Centeno, the spokesman of the brigade, gave a speech stating, "Here we see Bolívar's dream materialize. Venezuela's sovereignty, self-determination and political cohesion are a message to those of us who assume this responsibility from an internationalist perspective. It means putting our lives in the service of the defense of the Bolivarian project, demanding the release of President Nicolás Maduro and the first combatant, and motivating the peoples in this struggle."

On 23 February 2026, the Venezuelan Ministry of Foreign Affairs and the Simón Bolívar Institute reported that a group of international volunteers who were in the country and joined the International Brigade in order to show solidarity with Venezuela. The group included people from the United States, Brazil, and Colombia, and members of the feminist organization Code Pink.
