= List of international presidential trips made by Xiomara Castro =

This is a list of international presidential trips made by Xiomara Castro, the 39th President of Honduras, who served from 27 January 2022 to 27 January 2026. During her presidency, Castro traveled extensively throughout Latin America, North America, Europe and Asia, attending presidential inaugurations, international summits, multilateral meetings and conducting bilateral visits. According to the Constitution of Honduras, during the president's absence, one of the three vice presidents serves as acting president.

== Summary ==
The countries visited by President Castro during her presidency included:

- One visit each to Argentina, Belgium, Bolivia, China, Colombia, Cuba, Dominican Republic, El Salvador, France, Guatemala, Montenegro, Saint Vincent and the Grenadines, Uruguay and the United Arab Emirates
- Two visits each to Italy, Panama, Spain and Brazil
- Three visits to Mexico and the Vatican City
- Four visits to the United States

(Note: Costa Rica appears in some secondary sources and the Spanish-language counterpart list but is not detailed in the chronological tables below.)

== 2022 ==
No.	Country	Areas visited	Date(s)	Notes
1	Colombia	Bogotá	7 August	Attended the inauguration of President Gustavo Petro. Held a bilateral meeting with Petro and met with USAID administrator Samantha Power to discuss the global food and energy crisis.
2	United States	New York City	19 September	Attended the 77th session of the United Nations General Assembly. Met with United Nations Secretary-General António Guterres concerning the proposed International Commission against Corruption and Impunity in Honduras (CICIH).
3	Italy	Rome	17–19 October	Spoke at the World Food Forum organized by the Food and Agriculture Organization (FAO). Met with FAO Director-General Qu Dongyu and President Sergio Mattarella of Italy.
4	Vatican City	Vatican City	20 October	Met with Pope Francis at the Apostolic Palace.
5	United States	New York City	11–15 December	Met with UN Secretary-General António Guterres concerning the CICIH and participated in the signing of the memorandum of understanding between Honduras and the United Nations concerning its establishment.

== 2023 ==
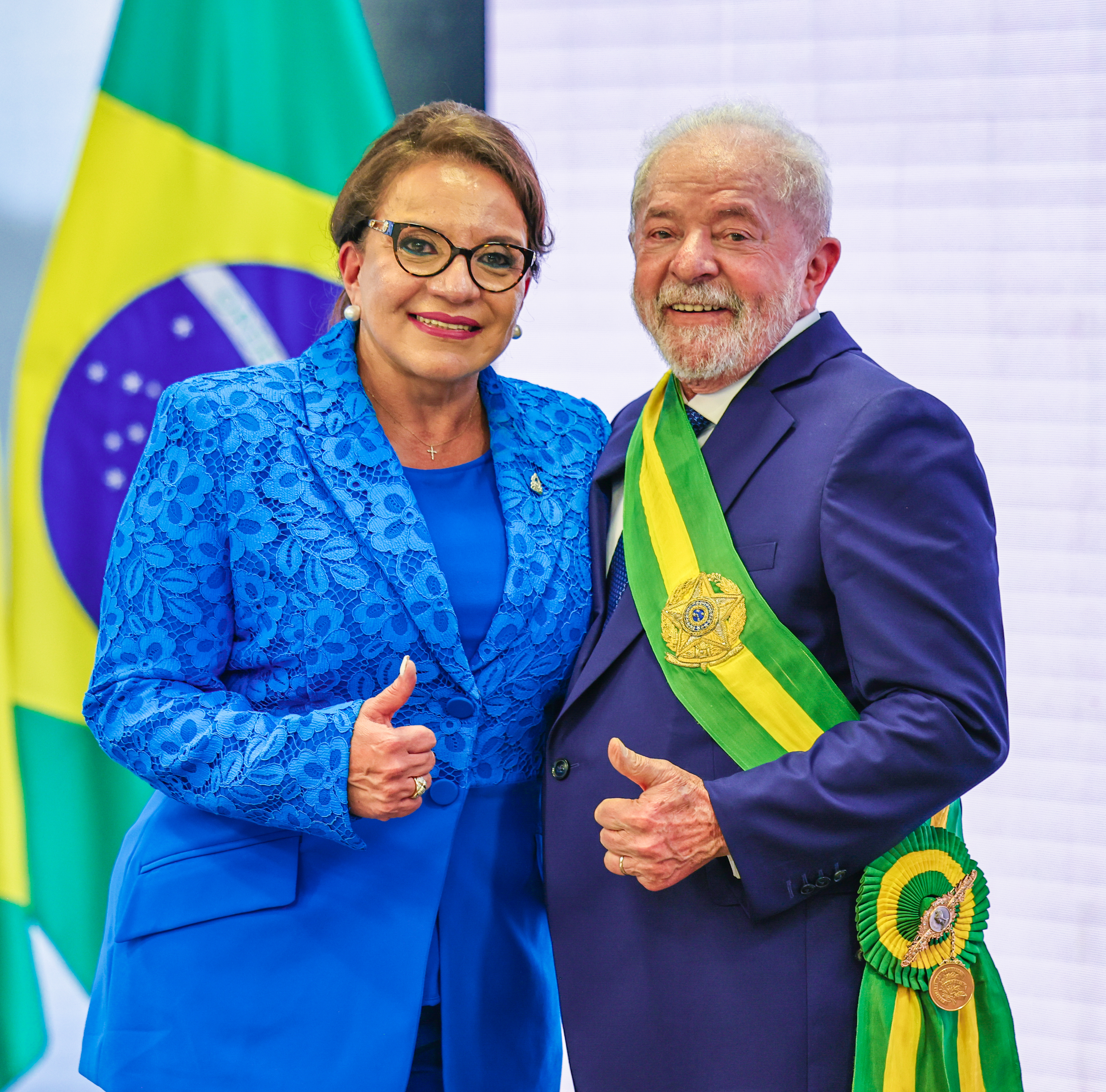
Castro with Brazilian President Luiz Inácio Lula da Silva in January 2023

No.	Country	Areas visited	Date(s)	Notes
6	Brazil	Brasília	30 December 2022–2 January	Attended the third inauguration of President Luiz Inácio Lula da Silva and held a bilateral meeting with him.
7	Argentina	Buenos Aires	24 January	Attended the 7th summit of the Community of Latin American and Caribbean States (CELAC). Met with President Alberto Fernández.
8	Spain	Madrid	20–22 February	Working visit. Met with Prime Minister Pedro Sánchez and held a bilateral meeting with King Felipe VI of Spain.
9	China	Shanghai	9 June	Official visit following the establishment of diplomatic relations between Honduras and the People's Republic of China. Met with President Xi Jinping and opened the Honduran embassy in China.
10	Belgium	Brussels	17–18 July	Attended the 3rd EU–CELAC Summit. Advocated peace, equality and non-interference in Cuba, Venezuela and Nicaragua. Met with representatives of the CAF – Development Bank of Latin America and the Caribbean.
11	Cuba	Havana	16 September	Attended the G77+China summit. Met with Venezuelan President Nicolás Maduro and former Cuban President Raúl Castro.
12	United States	New York City	20 September	Attended the 78th session of the United Nations General Assembly. Visited Honduran migrant processing centers and met with U.S. Secretary of Homeland Security Alejandro Mayorkas concerning irregular migration.
13	France	Paris	16–18 October	Attended the Global Meeting of the School Meals Coalition. Met with World Food Programme Executive Director Cindy McCain and French Secretary of State Chrysoula Zacharopoulou.
14	Mexico	Palenque, Chiapas	22 October	Attended the migration summit “Palenque Meeting, for a fraternal neighborhood with well-being”, alongside leaders and representatives from 12 countries.
15	United Arab Emirates	Dubai	1–3 December	Attended the COP28 climate summit. Castro delivered a speech on climate change and held meetings with international leaders, including King Charles III.

== 2024 ==
No.	Country	Areas visited	Date(s)	Notes
16	Guatemala	Guatemala City	13–15 January	Attended the inauguration of President Bernardo Arévalo and held a bilateral meeting with him.
17	Saint Vincent and the Grenadines	Kingstown	1–2 March	Attended the 8th CELAC Summit and assumed the pro tempore presidency of CELAC for 2024–2025.
18	El Salvador	San Salvador	1 June	Attended the second inauguration of President Nayib Bukele. Met with King Felipe VI of Spain and Presidents Nayib Bukele and Santiago Peña.
19	Panama	Panama City	1 July	Attended the inauguration of President José Raúl Mulino. Met with the president and senior executives of CAF.
20	Dominican Republic	Santo Domingo	16 August	Attended the second inauguration of President Luis Abinader.
21	United States	New York City	25 September	Attended the 79th session of the United Nations General Assembly.
22	Mexico	Mexico City	29 September–1 October	Attended the inauguration of President Claudia Sheinbaum and held a bilateral meeting with her.
23	Panama	Panama City	3–4 December	Attended the XXXVIII Ordinary and Commemorative Assembly of the Latin American and Caribbean Parliament (Parlatino).

== 2025 ==
No.	Country	Areas visited	Date(s)	Notes
24	Uruguay	Montevideo	28 February–1 March	Attended the inauguration of President Yamandú Orsi. Met with the president-elect and visited former president José Mujica.
25	Vatican City	Vatican City	25 April	Attended the funeral of Pope Francis at St. Peter's Basilica.
26	Spain	Seville	29 June–3 July	Attended the Fourth International Conference on Financing for Development of the United Nations. Held a bilateral meeting with Prime Minister Pedro Sánchez.
27	Bolivia	Sucre	4–6 August	Attended celebrations marking the bicentenary of Bolivian independence and held bilateral meetings with President Luis Arce.
28	Vatican City	Vatican City	16–19 September	Met with Pope Leo XIV at the Vatican. The meeting was Castro's third visit to the Vatican during her presidency.
29	Montenegro	Podgorica	27–29 September	Participated in the Women Political Leaders 2025 summit. Received the “Pioneers in Female Political Leadership” award and held bilateral meetings with Montenegrin officials and Women Political Leaders founder Silvana Koch-Mehrin.
30	Brazil	Belém	5–8 November	Attended the COP30 Leaders' Summit and participated in bilateral meetings with other heads of state and government.
31	Mexico	Mexico City	23–25 November	Last international trip as president. Held a bilateral meeting with President Claudia Sheinbaum concerning bilateral relations and cooperation.

== Multilateral meetings ==
Multilateral meetings of the following intergovernmental organizations took place during Xiomara Castro's presidency (2022–2026).

Group	Year			
Group	2022	2023	2024	2025
UN General Assembly	19 September, (United States) New York City	20 September, (United States) New York City	25 September, (United States) New York City	—
CELAC Summit	—	24 January, (Argentina) Buenos Aires	1–2 March, (Saint Vincent and the Grenadines) Kingstown	—
EU–CELAC Summit	—	17–18 July, (Belgium) Brussels	—	—
G77+China Summit	—	16 September, (Cuba) Havana	—	—
COP28	—	1–3 December, (United Arab Emirates) Dubai	—	—
COP30	—	—	—	5–8 November, (Brazil) Belém

== See also ==
- Foreign relations of Honduras
- List of international presidential trips made by Nasry Asfura, her successor
