= Donroe Doctrine =

Donald Trump's foreign policy in the Americas

Donroe Doctrine Part of the Post–Cold War era
- November 2025 – Ongoing
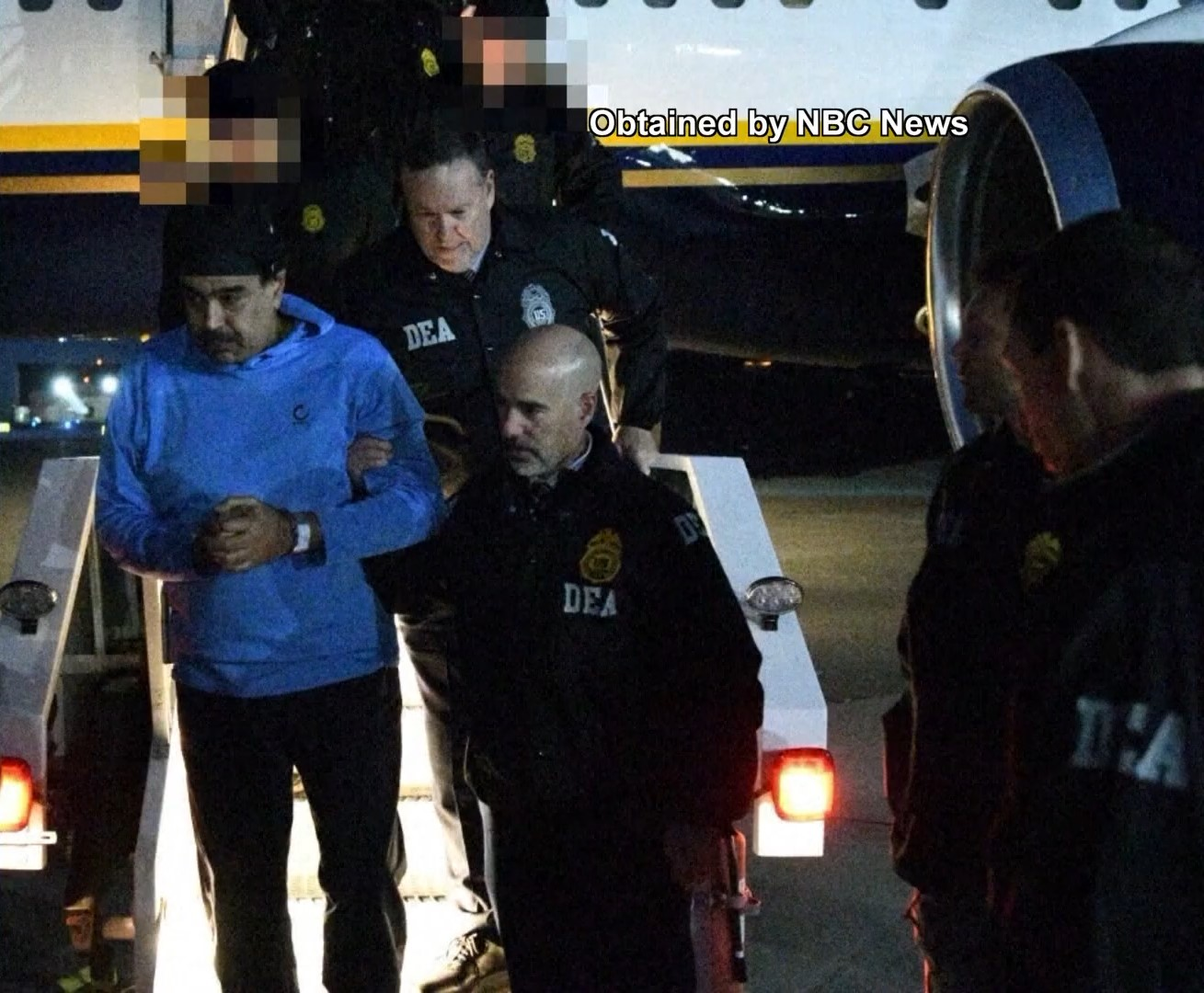
- Nicolás Maduro being escorted by the DEA
- Duration: 21st century
- Location: Western Hemisphere (Americas)
- Including: Retooling of the Monroe Doctrine (1823) and Roosevelt Corollary (1904)
- President: Donald Trump
- Key events: Publication of the US National Security Strategy (Nov 2025); U.S. military operation and capture of Nicolás Maduro in Caracas (Jan 2026); Implementation of global and regional trade tariff enforcement

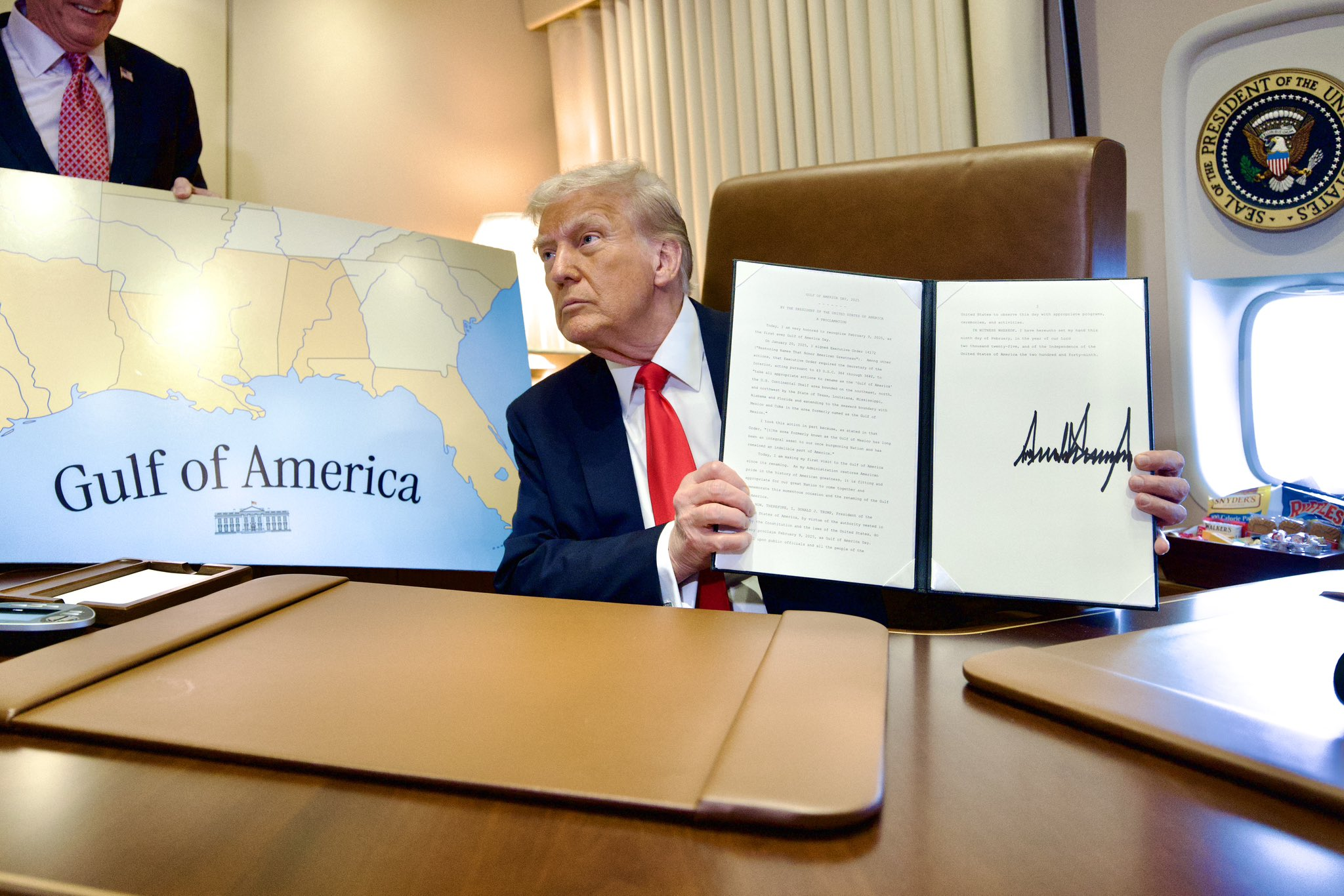
Executive Order 14172 directing U.S. federal agencies to refer to the Gulf of Mexico as the "Gulf of America" has been highlighted as an element of the Donroe Doctrine.

The Donroe Doctrine, alternatively styled as the Trump Corollary to the Monroe Doctrine, is an interpretation of principles of President Donald Trump's foreign policy in the Americas. An adaptation of the historical Monroe Doctrine, it describes a perceived desire by the second Trump administration to assert American predominance in the Western Hemisphere.

Trump's efforts to rename the Gulf of Mexico and Lake Ontario, acquire Canada, the Panama Canal, and Greenland, as well as pursuing military action against Venezuela have all been cited as part of a Trump corollary to the Monroe Doctrine. Additionally, Trump's "America First" agenda and skepticism of multilateralism has contributed to a view that the U.S. is focusing on its own hemisphere at the expense of traditional alliances, such as NATO.

Following the 2026 U.S. strikes in Venezuela and capture of its president Nicolás Maduro, Trump himself referred to "the Donroe Doctrine", stating that "American dominance in the Western Hemisphere will never be questioned again".

While supporters see the doctrine as restoring American primacy and combating the influence of China and Russia in the continent, critics have suggested that it could set a precedent for illiberal regimes to violate the rule of law and pursue territorial expansion.

== Background ==
=== Monroe Doctrine ===
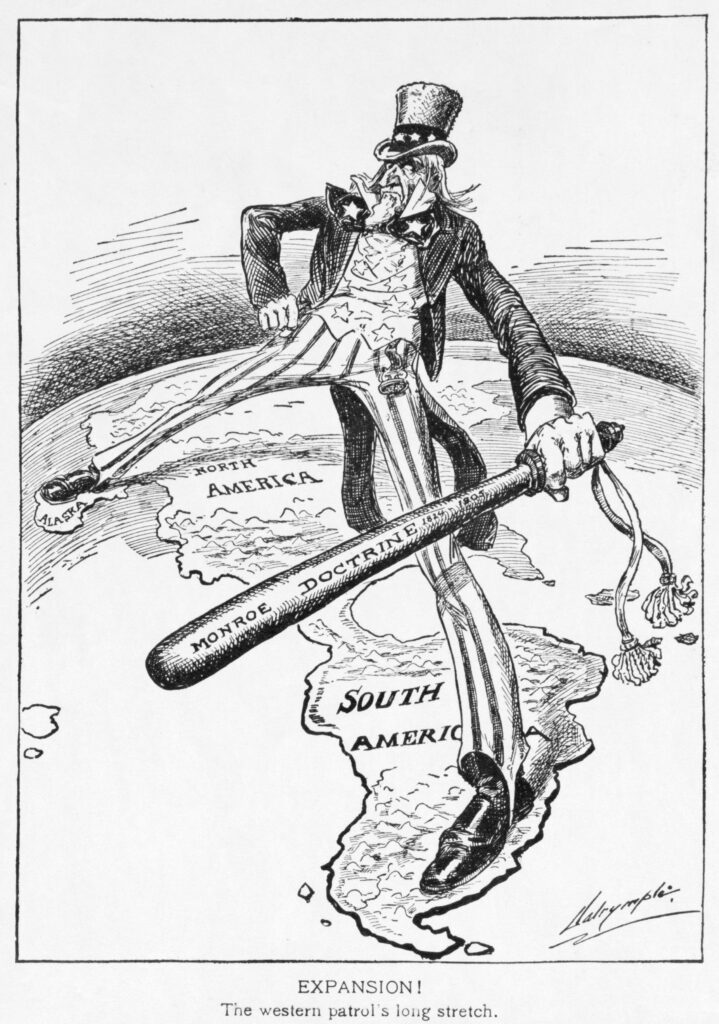
Political cartoon by Louis Dalrymple about U.S. expansionism; Uncle Sam straddles the Americas while wielding a truncheon inscribed with the words "Monroe Doctrine 1824–1905". The truncheon is a metaphor for American military force.

The original 19th-century Monroe Doctrine was outlined in James Monroe's December 1823 State of the Union Address. It opposed European intervention in the Americas and warned foreign powers that the United States would not tolerate colonization of its neighbors. At the turn of the 19th century, the Monroe Doctrine was a tried and tested foreign policy. Theodore Roosevelt's military expeditions in Latin America (Santo Domingo and Nicaragua) arguably extended the principle of the Monroe Doctrine to justifying intervention to prevent foreign powers from gaining influence in a U.S. zone of influence.

=== First Trump administration ===
The first Trump administration challenged the human rights record of the Cuban, Nicaraguan, and Venezuelan regimes. In 2017, Trump stated that he was considering using military force in Venezuela during a period of civil unrest. In 2018, Trump signed the Nicaragua Human Rights and Anticorruption Act of 2018, which imposed restrictions and sanctions on those responsible for civil rights infringements. Also in 2018, Trump stated that the U.S. was committed to "maintaining our independence from the encroachment of expansionist foreign powers" in the Americas.

In August 2019, Trump expressed interest in buying Greenland from Denmark. In reaction, Greenland's foreign ministry declared that the territory was not for sale. Citing Denmark's reluctance to discuss any purchase, Trump canceled a scheduled September trip to Copenhagen days later. The Trump administration declared rare-earth minerals to be vital to national security. With Chinese companies investing in mining of Greenland's abundant resources, the U.S. signed in 2019 an agreement to fund an aerial survey of mineral resources in Garðar.

In July 2020, Trump signed the United States–Mexico–Canada Agreement (USMCA), replacing NAFTA. The second Trump administration was accused of breaching the USMCA when the 2025 United States trade war with Canada and Mexico began in February 2025, with 25% import tariffs introduced by the U.S. to counter the "extraordinary threat posed by illegal aliens and drugs".

== Origin ==
The cover of the New York Post which has been widely credited as the origin of the portmanteau Donroe Doctrine

On January 8, 2025, the tabloid New York Post published a front cover with the title "The Donroe Doctrine: Trump's vision for hemisphere". It has been suggested that this was the origin of the portmanteau of Donald Trump and the Monroe Doctrine. The paper's front page showed an image of Trump pointing to a map in which Canada is crossed out and renamed "51st state", Greenland is labeled "our land", and the Panama Canal is labeled "Pana-MAGA". The term did not immediately gain traction following publication of the Post cover but began to circulate more widely in the fall of 2025 with headlines in the Financial Times, The New York Times and other outlets. It was also cited on the Fox News and Fox & Friends several times. The doctrine has alternatively styled as the Trump Corollary to the Monroe Doctrine. Trump would go on to use the term himself following the raid in Venezuela in January 2026, saying "they now call it the 'Donroe Doctrine'", in what was viewed as an admission that he himself did not invent the term.

Trump has a complex relationship with the New York Post. His love has been described as "well known", and he has previously acted as a source for stories, a consumer of the publication, and appeared in the Page Six gossip column under his own name and as fake public relations agent John Baron. On January 7, 2026, the cover was shared by the House Foreign Affairs Committee social media account on X with a caption reading, "Our country was built by warriors and explorers. We tamed the West, won two World Wars, and were the first to plant our flag on the moon. President Trump has the biggest dreams for America and it's un-American to be afraid of big dreams" before later deleting the post. A digitally modified version of the same cover was later re-uploaded. The cover said "The Trump Doctrine" and the post explained "President Trump's America First vision is worthy of being called by its own doctrine."

== Second Trump administration ==
Since his second inauguration, Trump's efforts to rename the Gulf of Mexico, acquire Canada, the Panama Canal, and Greenland, and pursue military action against Venezuela have all been cited as part of the doctrine which seeks to establish U.S. dominance in the Americas, while countering the influence of other major powers. The administration's national security strategy, released in November 2025, explicitly references the Monroe Doctrine and asserts a "Trump Corollary" to the doctrine. It stated the intention of the Trump administration to "reassert and enforce the Monroe doctrine to restore American pre-eminence in the Western Hemisphere". Maduro's capture and Trump's remarks are seen as a warning sign of how the United States may behave across multiple theatres.

Trump's decision to use naval forces in the Caribbean targeting alleged drug boats has also been labeled as an example of both the Donroe Doctrine and a revival of gunboat diplomacy which avoids large-scale action. It was described by John D. Feeley, a former U.S. ambassador to Panama, as a "very parochial New York view" of foreign relations and likened it to mob bosses battling for control of turf in New York. While the original Monroe Doctrine sought to exclude European interference in the Americas, the Donroe Doctrine has been described as a similar attempt to exclude Chinese and Russian influence in the region. Trump has expressed interest in creating an American security sphere aimed at regional security and countering foreign interference. In 2026 he announced the creation of the Shield of the Americas, a regional military organization that the majority of Latin American nations have signed onto.

=== Implementation ===
The Donroe Doctrine has been used to described different instances in the second presidency of Donald Trump.

"Donroe Doctrine" State Actions (2025–2026)
Target Jurisdiction	Declared Core Strategic Threat	U.S. Executive & Military Actions	Present Geopolitical Outcome	Wikisource Reference
Venezuela	State-level hostility, Russian/Chinese sovereign access to energy reserves, and alleged narco-trafficking.	Executed a Caribbean energy blockade in late 2025, culminating in Operation Absolute Resolve (January 3, 2026)—a targeted military incursion resulting in the capture of President Nicolás Maduro.	Maduro extradited to New York on federal trafficking indictments; establishment of a transitional administration under Delcy Rodríguez and negotiation of a major bilateral energy concession.	Executive Order 14245
Cuba	Ideological subversion and hosting of hostile extra-hemispheric signals intelligence infrastructure.	Enacted an unyielding maritime fuel blockade alongside re-designation as a State Sponsor of Terrorism.	Near-total collapse of national energy infrastructure and acute domestic economic contraction.	Executive Order 14404
Panama	Extra-hemispheric commercial infrastructure footprints flanking the Panama Canal corridor.	High-level diplomatic ultimatums regarding third-party state concession operations within critical transit logistics.	Abrogation of deepwater port access concessions to foreign state-linked entities; formal detachment from global infrastructure pacts.	None available (Diplomatic briefs)
Mexico	Transnational criminal organization autonomy, fentanyl transit pipelines, and unregulated migratory flows.	Unilateral executive declaration designating major cartel networks as Foreign Terrorist Organizations (FTOs), backed by targeted drone strikes and cross-border security deployment mandates.	Formation of the "Shield of the Americas" operational security pact to enforce synchronized anti-cartel interdiction regimes.	Executive Order 14157
Colombia	Ideological misalignment under President Gustavo Petro and structural resurgence of domestic illicit production.	Strategic redirection of regional military assistance assets and explicit economic warnings concerning counter-narcotics compliance.	Unraveling of historical security coordination protocols; Bogotá initiated a strategic economic pivot toward the BRICS network.	None available (Security pivot)
Argentina	Sovereign debt exposure creating vulnerability to adversarial financial dependency models.	Proactive financial stabilization intervention, leveraging U.S. Treasury mechanisms to extend a $20 billion economic line of credit to the administration of President Javier Milei.	Solidification of Buenos Aires as a key regional partner, though balancing ongoing local currency requirements with extra-hemispheric markets remains an ongoing issue.	None available (Treasury credit)
Greenland / Arctic	Access to strategic rare-earth deposits and regional vulnerability along the High North transit corridor.	Reactivation of high-level diplomatic and sovereignty purchase proposals directed toward the Kingdom of Denmark.	Met with explicit structural resistance from European partners; integrated into the broader statutory defense architecture for total Western Hemisphere preeminence. Security deal reached giving the US exclusive security and natural resource access.	Monroe Doctrine (1823) 22 September 2026 Agreement

=== South America ===
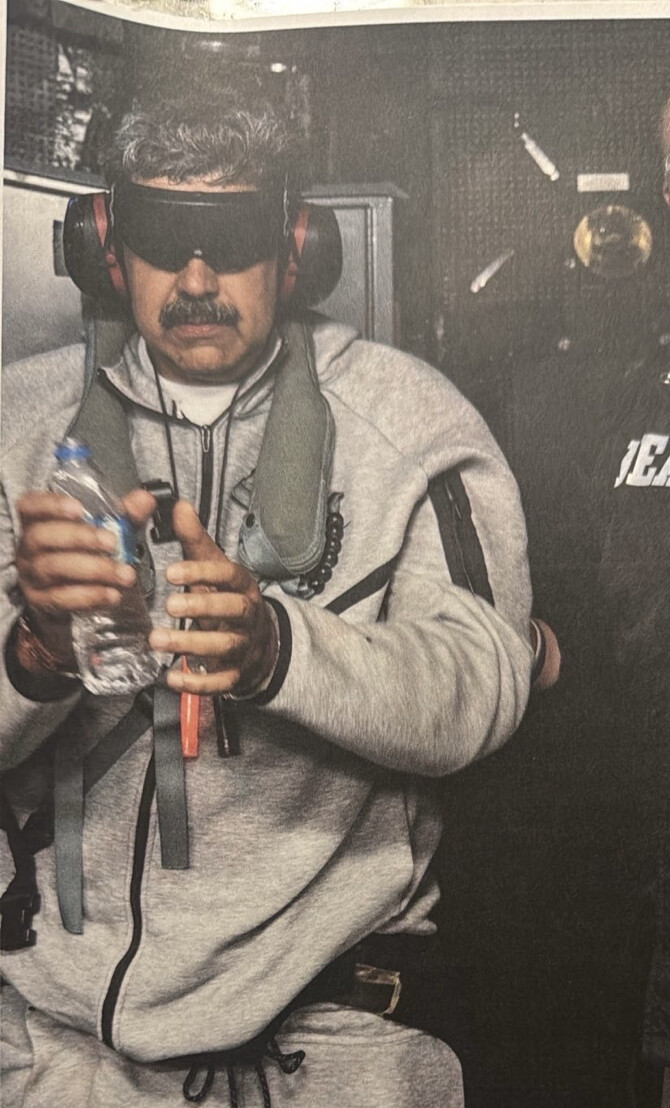
President Nicolás Maduro on board the USS Iwo Jima following his capture by U.S. forces. This incident has been widely cited as a manifestation of the Donroe Doctrine.

On January 3, 2026, U.S. military and federal law enforcement apprehended the President of Venezuela, Nicolás Maduro, in a mission codenamed Operation Absolute Resolve. Following Maduro's arrest, the official State Department X account wrote, "This is OUR Hemisphere and President Trump will not allow our security to be threatened". In a press conference later that day, Trump referred to "the Donroe document", stating that "American dominance in the Western Hemisphere will never be questioned again".

Trump has repeatedly praised Argentine president Javier Milei, who was the first foreign leader to meet with Trump after he won the 2024 U.S. presidential election. Milei came out in support of the U.S.' capture of Nicolás Maduro in January 2026. The Trump administration's support for the Argentinian government, including a $20 billion financial assistance package, particularly during the 2025 Argentine legislative election, has been cited as an example of the Donroe Doctrine in effect.

Strengthened relations with President of El Salvador Nayib Bukele, including cooperation in the administration's deportation efforts have also been identified as part of this approach.

In October 2025, Trump accused Colombian President Gustavo Petro of being an "illegal drug dealer" and simultaneously cut off diplomatic aid to Colombia. Since that time, Trump has directed the United States military to strike alleged drug trafficking vessels along Colombia's coasts, while at the same time striking similar vessels along Venezuela's coast after claiming Maduro was a drug trafficker. Following Operation Absolute Resolve, Trump appeared to threaten Petro. When asked if he was considering a military strike in Colombia, he said, "It sounds good to me", and again described Petro as a drug trafficker.

In March 2026, the United States launched Operation Total Extermination, military operations against "designated terrorist organizations" in Ecuador.

Support for other current and former South American leaders, including advocating for Jair Bolsonaro (convicted former President of Brazil), offering military cooperation with Daniel Noboa (President of Ecuador), and pardoning Juan Orlando Hernández (former President of Honduras), has been identified has part of a "refocusing of strategic resources on the Western Hemisphere". Since 2024, several South American nations have elected right wing governments as part of a conservative wave, many with overtly pro-America and pro-Trump stances.

Internal Pentagon documents suggesting the US might question the United Kingdom's sovereignty of the Falkland Islands have also been characterized as potentially indicative of the Donroe Doctrine in force.

=== North America ===
On his first day in office following his election in 2024, Trump issued an executive order to rename the Gulf of Mexico to the Gulf of America. He has also offered to send troops to Mexico to combat drug trafficking, although President Claudia Sheinbaum declined. The CIA conducted operations against purported drug traffickers in Mexico in 2025 and 2026. Trump's calls for Canada to become the 51st state, as well as the imposition of tariffs, have been viewed as examples of the doctrine in force. The buildup of U.S. military assets in Puerto Rico has been attributed to the doctrine's support for power projection.

==== Greenland ====
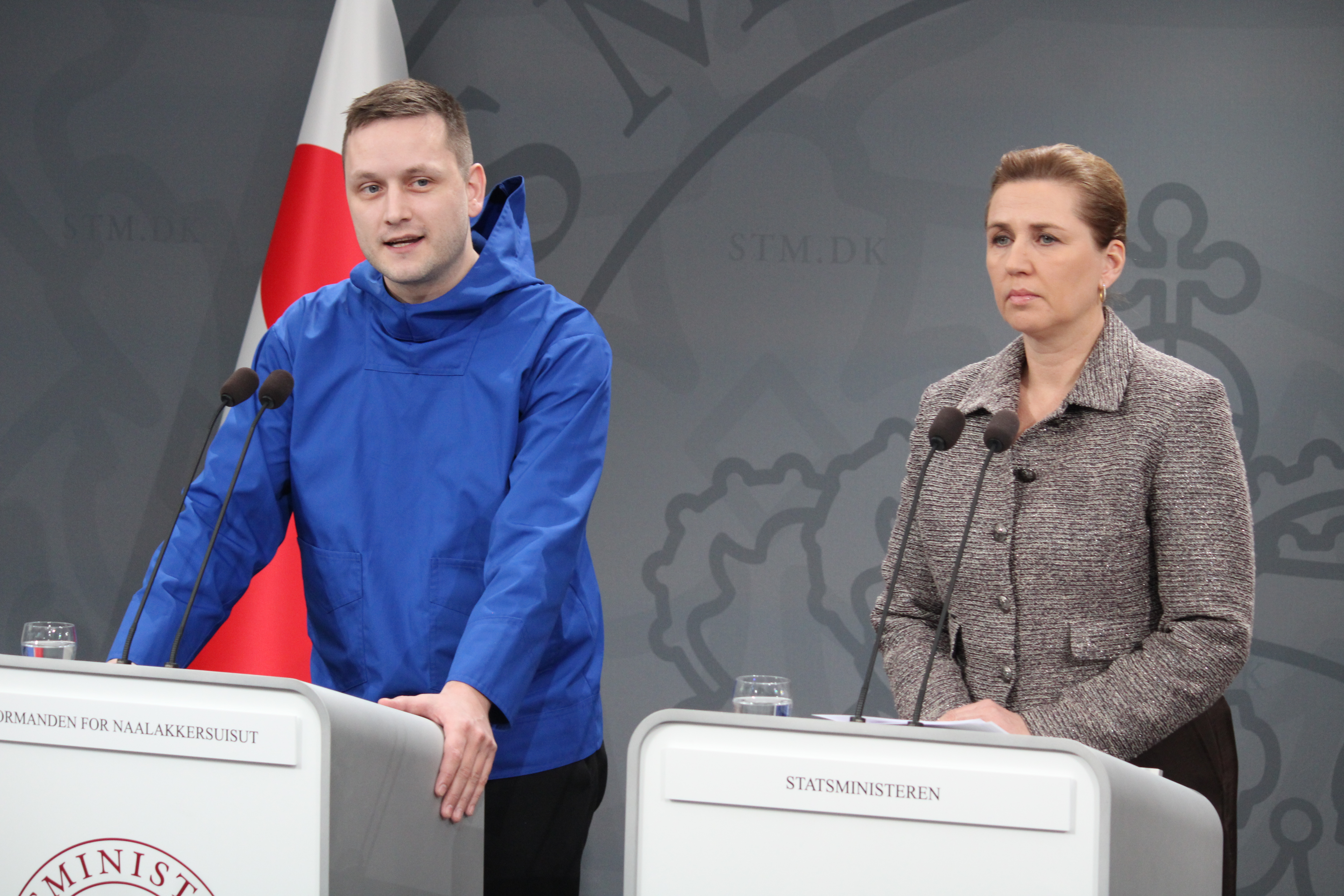
Greenlandic leader Jens-Frederik Nielsen announcing "We choose Denmark" at a January 2026 press conference with Mette Frederiksen in response to Trump's threats to invade or annex the country

The Trump administration had made efforts to acquire Greenland as a strategically important area as far back as 2017. JD Vance supported the idea of American ownership, traveling to Greenland in March 2025. Following the January 2026 raids in Venezuela, questions arose as to whether increasing focus on Greenland was also within the purview of Trump's goal, even by force. The renewed focus on Greenland followed a provocative tweet by Katie Miller, wife of senior Trump adviser Stephen Miller, showing Greenland draped in the U.S. flag with the word "soon". This prompted journalists to question Trump directly, rapidly shifting the news agenda. Stephen Miller has openly framed Trump's foreign policy as one based on raw power, reinforcing concerns that the administration views an American superpower status as justification for coercive action. White House press secretary Karoline Leavitt said of acquiring Greenland, "utilizing the U.S. Military is always an option."

At the 56th World Economic Forum, Trump said Greenland "is actually part of North America on the northern frontier of the Western Hemisphere, that's our territory (...) And in fact, it's been our policy for hundreds of years to prevent outside threats from entering our hemisphere, and we've done it very successfully.".

On 22 September 2026, during the general debate of the eighty-first session of the United Nations General Assembly, the United States, Denmark, and Greenland signed a security agreement that increases US involvement in Greenland's defence while affirming Danish sovereignty and Greenland's right to self-determination. Later that month, Frihedsbrevet linked U.S. Arctic Research Commission Tom Dans, using hidden recordings of conversations between him, Jørgen Boassen, Kuno Fencker and its mole, 21-year old theology student Christian Ursilva, to efforts to secure backdoor U.S. investments in Greenland. Danish experts stated that Dans seemed to be mixing official and private interests.

=== Iceland ===
As a result of Trump's repeated annexation threats against Greenland and jokes about Iceland becoming the "52nd state" by U.S. ambassador Billy Long, Icelandic officials noted having to work with "like-minded countries" amid a world order "rupture" while avoiding to offend the Trump administration. In an interview from The Reykjavík Grapevine, Paweł Bartoszek discussed the extent to which the Donroe Doctrine affects Iceland.

== Reactions ==
While supporters see the doctrine as restoring American primacy and combating the influence of China and Russia in the region, critics have suggested that it could set a precedent for illiberal regimes to violate the rule of law and pursue territorial expansion.

Paraguayan president Santiago Peña expressed support for the doctrine, saying that Latin America will benefit from it.

The 2026 Iran war, which contributed to global economic disruption and the ensuing fuel crisis, has been interpreted as counterproductive to the Donroe Doctrine. For instance, in undermining the presidency of José Antonio Kast in Chile.

== See also ==
- American expansionism under Donald Trump
- Foreign policy of the second Trump administration
- United States presidential doctrines
- Roosevelt Corollary
- Western Alienation
