= Shield of the Americas Summit =

2026 international summit hosted by U.S. President Donald Trump

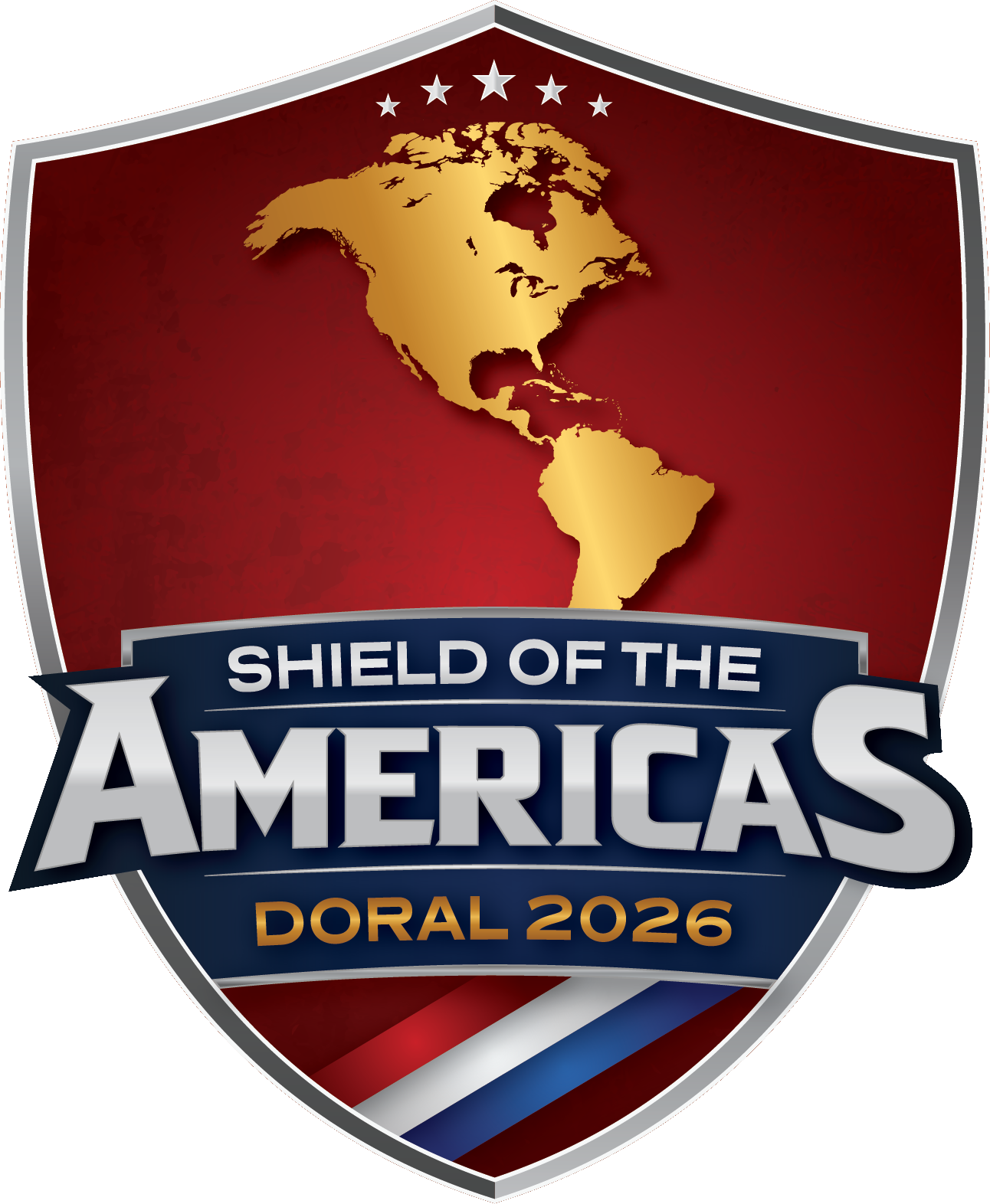

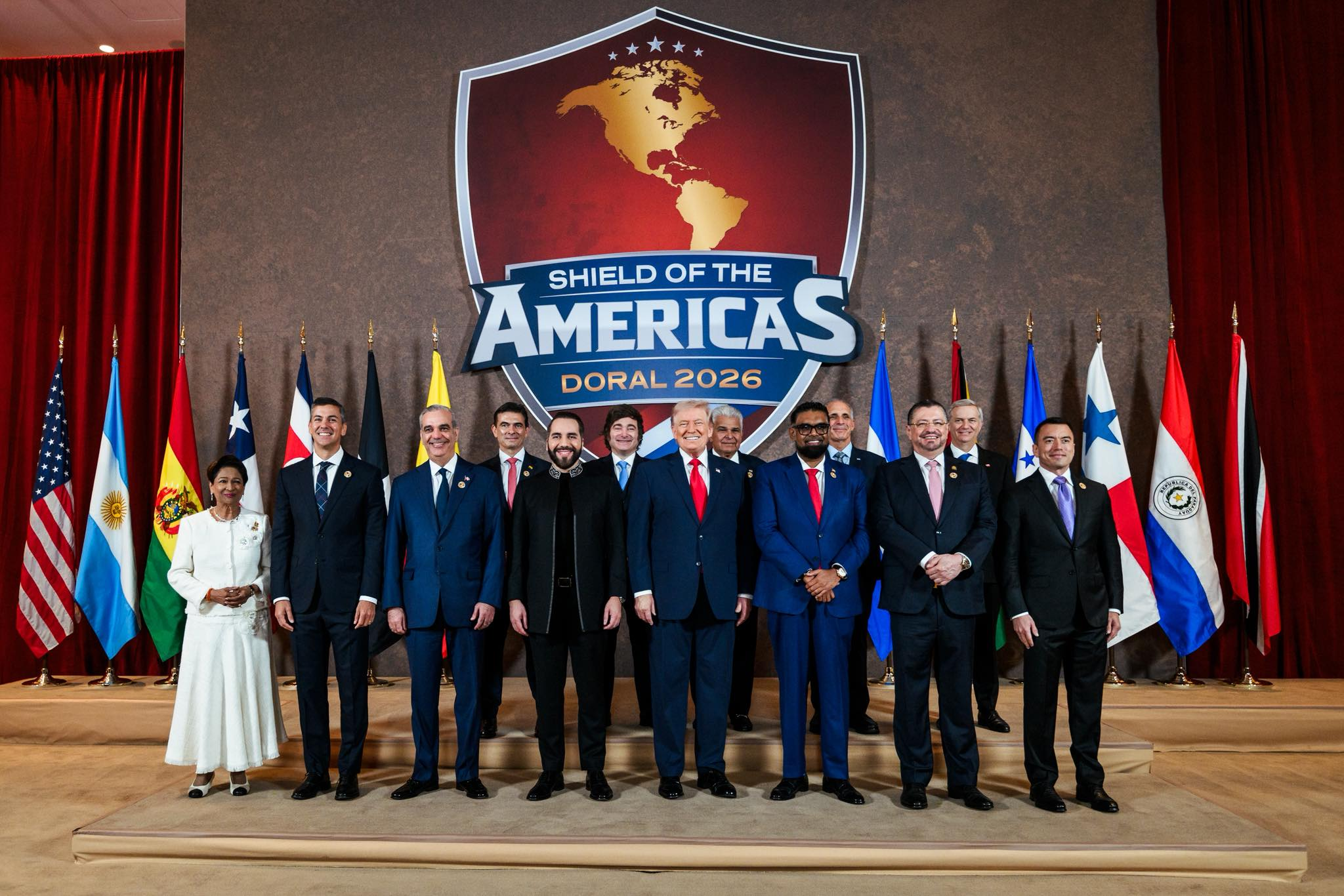
- Heads of state and government representatives at the inaugural Shield of the Americas Summit, Trump National Doral Miami
- Host country: United States
- Date: March 7, 2026; 8 months ago
- Cities: Doral, Florida
- Venues: Trump National Doral Miami
- Participants: See Participants
- Chair: Donald Trump

The Shield of the Americas Summit was a one-day international meeting held on March 7, 2026, at the Trump National Doral Miami resort in Doral, Florida. Hosted by U.S. President Donald Trump in his second term, the summit brought together leaders and senior officials from roughly a dozen countries in Latin America and the Caribbean to discuss coordinated action against transnational organized crime and above all drug cartels, as well as illegal emigration, money laundering, and what U.S. officials described as growing foreign interference in the Western Hemisphere, especially by China.

The gathering formally launched the Shield of the Americas, presented by the Trump administration as a standing mechanism for intelligence sharing, joint law enforcement operations, and in some cases direct military support targeting cartel leadership and infrastructure, including the joint United States and Ecuador attack on a group of FARC dissidents called Comandos de la Frontera during the Ecuadorian conflict. The event was attended by leaders from Argentina, Bolivia, Chile, Costa Rica, the Dominican Republic, Ecuador, El Salvador, Guyana, Honduras, Panama, Paraguay, and Trinidad and Tobago.

== Background ==
The summit took place against the backdrop of record U.S. overdose deaths attributed to fentanyl and other synthetic opioids largely produced by Mexican cartels, combined with persistent concern in Washington about Chinese investment in ports, telecommunications, and critical minerals across the region.

Administration officials had already pointed to several recent actions as precursors: expanded counternarcotics cooperation with Ecuador, the high-profile January 2026 U.S. special-operations capture of former Venezuelan president Nicolás Maduro, and broader rhetoric framing narco-trafficking as a form of "asymmetric warfare" against the United States. The choice of Trump National Doral as the venue, together with the prominent role given to Special Envoy Kristi Noem (recently transferred from Homeland Security), underscored the personal investment of the president in the initiative.

== Participants ==
Attendance was by invitation only and skewed toward right-leaning or Trump-friendly administrations. The following delegations were confirmed to have participated at the head-of-state or head-of-government level unless otherwise noted:

- United States – President Donald Trump (host), Secretary of State Marco Rubio, Secretary of Defense Pete Hegseth, Special Envoy Kristi Noem
- Argentina – President Javier Milei
- Bolivia – President Rodrigo Paz Pereira
- Chile – President-elect José Antonio Kast
- Costa Rica – President Rodrigo Chaves
- Dominican Republic – President Luis Abinader
- Ecuador – President Daniel Noboa
- El Salvador – President Nayib Bukele
- Guyana – senior representative (most likely President Irfaan Ali)
- Honduras – President Nasry Asfura
- Panama – President José Raúl Mulino
- Paraguay – President Santiago Peña
- Trinidad and Tobago – Prime Minister Kamla Persad-Bissessar

Major regional powers governed by left-of-center administrations Brazil, Colombia, and Mexico were not invited.

== Agenda and proceedings ==
Three main themes dominated the closed-door sessions and public remarks: strengthened counternarcotics operations (including U.S. offers of precision strikes on high-value cartel targets), enhanced border and migration controls, and measures to limit economic and political leverage exercised by China, Russia, and to a lesser extent Iran in the hemisphere.

Trump also used parts of his closing address to connect hemispheric security to recent U.S. military strikes on Iranian assets and to reiterate warnings directed at the governments of Cuba and the post-Maduro transitional authorities in Venezuela. Bilateral side meetings produced several smaller announcements, among them preliminary agreements on Venezuelan gold and oil transactions with U.S. partners.

== Outcomes ==
The most concrete result was Trump's signing of the presidential proclamation "Commitment to Countering Cartel Criminal Activity," which establishes the ACCC's overall framework.

=== Commitment to Countering Criminal Cartel Activity ===
The United States, under my leadership, has demonstrated a sustained commitment towards achieving the dismantlement of cartels and foreign terrorists operating in the Western Hemisphere. My Administration has designated a number of cartels and transnational gangs as foreign terrorist organizations and has since dedicated unprecedented resources towards their destruction. These international entities control territories and commerce, extort political and judicial systems, wield arms and field military capabilities, and use assassinations and terrorism to achieve their ends. In furtherance of our efforts, the Secretary of War established the Americas Counter Cartel Coalition, a pledge from military leaders and representatives from 17 countries demonstrating that the region is ready to operationalize hard power to defeat these threats to our security and civilization. We will address these grave dangers by use of any necessary resources and legally available authorities, together with our partner nations.

NOW, THEREFORE, I, DONALD J. TRUMP, President of the United States of America, by virtue of the authority vested in me by the Constitution and the laws of the United States, do hereby proclaim as follows:

(1) Criminal cartels and foreign terrorist organizations in the Western Hemisphere should be demolished to the fullest extent possible consistent with applicable law.

(2) The United States and its allies should coordinate to deprive these organizations of any control of territory and access to financing or resources necessary to conduct their campaigns of violence.

(3) The United States will train and mobilize partner nation militaries to achieve the most effective fighting force necessary to dismantle cartels and their ability to export violence and pursue influence through organized intimidation.

(4) The United States and its allies should keep external threats at bay, including malign foreign influences from outside the Western Hemisphere.

IN WITNESS WHEREOF, I have hereunto set my hand this seventh day of March, in the year of our Lord two thousand twenty-six, and of the Independence of the United States of America the two hundred and fiftieth.

DONALD J. TRUMP

=== Trump's remarks on Mexico and cartel violence ===
During the summit, President Trump criticized the role of Mexican drug cartels in regional violence and organized crime, calling Mexico the "epicenter" of cartel activity in the Western Hemisphere. He stated that much of the drug trafficking and gang-related violence in the region originates there.

President Trump also specifically criticized Claudia Sheinbaum, the current president of Mexico, suggesting her administration had not done enough to counter cartel influence. He emphasized that the United States would take measures to protect national security, including strengthening border security, reducing human smuggling, and cooperating with regional partners to target organized crime. President Trump also called for participating countries to enforce stricter domestic law and order measures, particularly against gangs and organized crime, as part of a coordinated effort to combat cartel networks and associated violence.

== Reception ==
Supporters in the United States and among attending governments welcomed the summit as overdue recognition of the transnational nature of the drug trade and a pragmatic realignment of hemispheric partnerships. Critics, including several nongovernmental organizations, expressed concern that the emphasis on military solutions and the exclusion of major democracies risked legitimizing authoritarian-leaning leaders while sidelining human-rights considerations. Some press coverage also highlighted lighter moments, among them Trump's offhand remark that he had "never really learned Spanish" and photographs showing cosmetic cover on what appeared to be a recent hand injury.

== See also ==
- Foreign policy of the second Donald Trump administration
- Summit of the Americas
- Mexican drug war
- Fentanyl
