= Shield of the Americas =

Multilateral military cooperation initiative

Shield of the Americas Escudo de las Américas
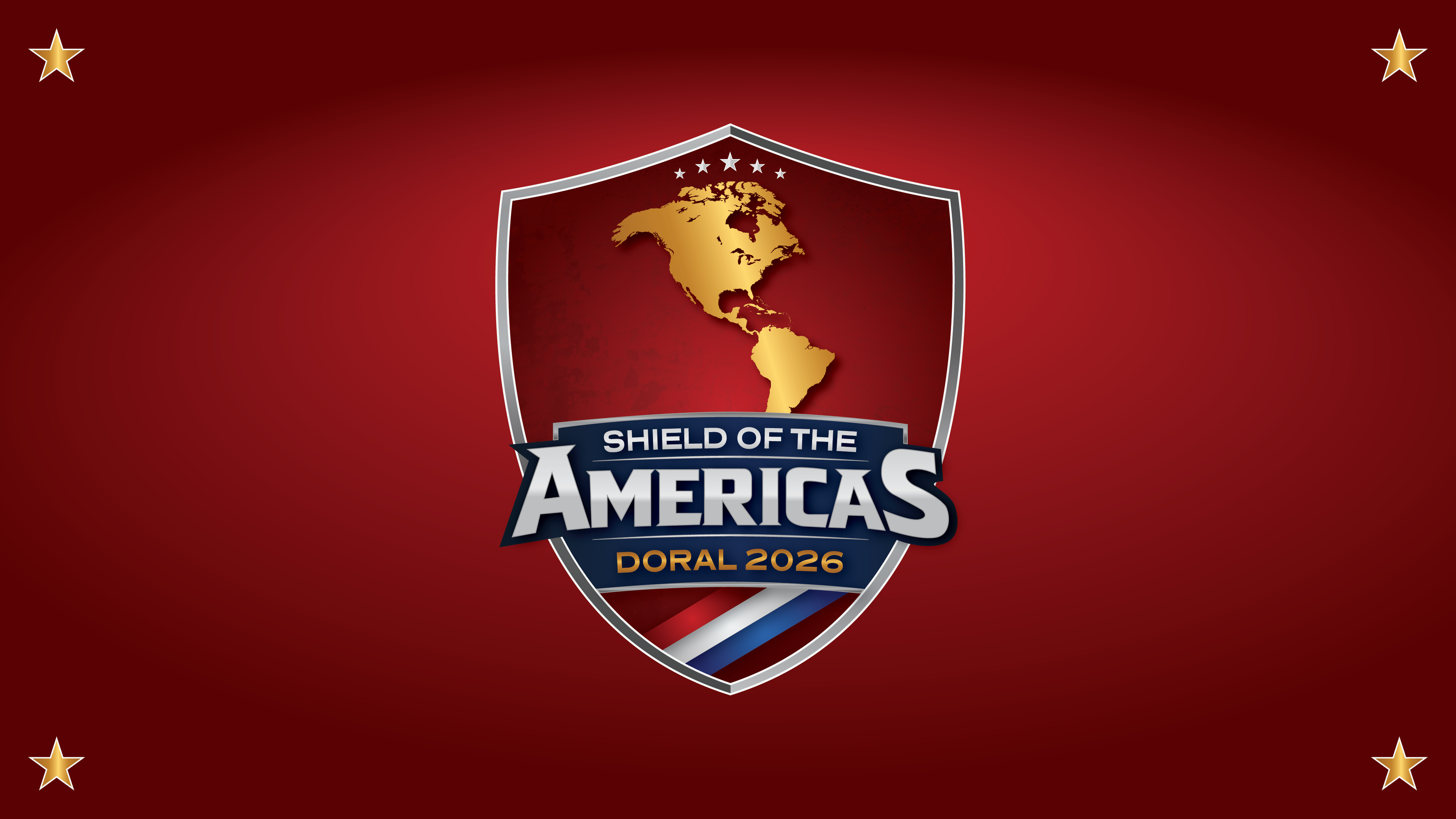
- Flag Official logo

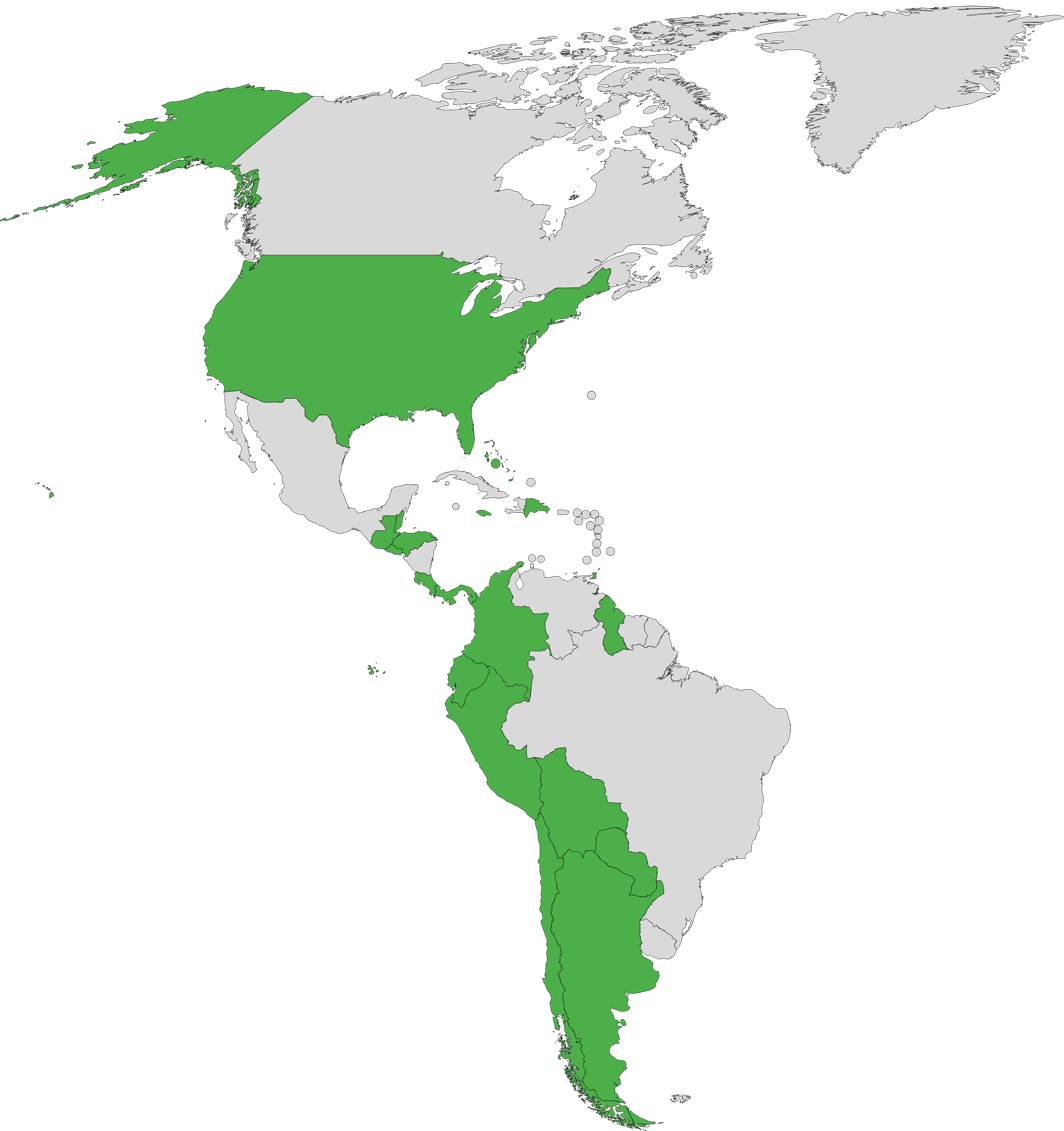
- Countries participating in the Shield of the Americas
- Type: International military and political coalition
- A3C membership: 19 countries: Argentina; Bahamas; Belize; Bolivia; Chile; Colombia; Costa Rica; Dominican Republic; Ecuador; El Salvador; Guatemala; Guyana; Honduras; Jamaica; Panama; Paraguay; Peru; Trinidad and Tobago; United States

Leaders
  - United States Special Envoy: Vacant
  - Chairman: Pete Hegseth

Establishment
  - Joint Security Declaration: March 5, 2026
  - Inaugural Shield summit: March 7, 2026
- Website www.state.gov/policy-issues/shield-of-the-americas

The Shield of the Americas (Spanish: Escudo de las Américas), also referred to by United States officials as the Americas Counter Cartel Coalition (A3C), is a multilateral military and political initiative aimed at fighting transnational gangs, countering illegal immigration and maintaining or asserting American geopolitical predominance in the Western Hemisphere.

The Shield of the Americas is led by the United States and was formed in March 2026, during the second Trump administration, as part of the Donroe Doctrine.

== History ==
=== Background ===
Trump’s administration had increasingly treated drug cartels as national security threats, citing the trafficking of fentanyl and other synthetic opioids into the United States. Although drug overdose deaths had declined from their earlier peak, the Centers for Disease Control and Prevention recorded approximately 48,400 deaths involving synthetic opioids in 2024.

Trump administration's regional policy also reflected concerns about China's expanding economic presence in Latin America, particularly its investments in ports, telecommunications networks and critical infrastructure, as well as its access to critical minerals.

Moreover, the formation of the Shield of the Americas comes in a context of a broader philosophy of renewing American imperialism, with the Donroe Doctrine. Hence, on January 3rd 2026, Venezuelan president Nicolás Maduro was captured during Operation Absolute Resolve and transferred to the United States to face criminal charges. Following Maduro's arrest, the State Department declared on X that "This is OUR Hemisphere and President Trump will not allow our security to be threatened”.

Prior establishing the coalition, the United States and Ecuador launched joint military operations against drug trafficking organizations, following an agreement to expand security cooperation under Ecuadorian president Daniel Noboa.

=== First conference ===
At the inaugural conference of the A3C, which took place on March 5, 2026, secretary of defense Pete Hegseth hosted representatives from 16 other countries at United States Southern Command headquarters in Doral, Florida. They signed the Joint Security Declaration stating their intention to expand security cooperation and participate in a coalition against narco-terrorism and other common threats.

The March 5 declaration, executed with equal validity in both Spanish and English, was signed by the United States, Argentina, the Bahamas, Belize, Bolivia, Costa Rica, the Dominican Republic, Ecuador, El Salvador, Guatemala, Guyana, Honduras, Jamaica, Panama, Paraguay, Peru as well as Trinidad and Tobago.

On the same day, President Trump announced the appointment of former homeland security secretary Kristi Noem as U.S. special envoy for the Shield of the Americas.

Analysts at the Center for Strategic and International Studies interpreted the gathering as part of a wider effort not only to combat organized crime as stated but also to reduce Chinese strategic influence in Latin America and the Caribbean. The Polish Institute of International Affairs similarly described the March summit as combining cooperation against organized crime with Trump administration's effort to reinforce its influence in the Western Hemisphere.

=== Inaugural summit ===
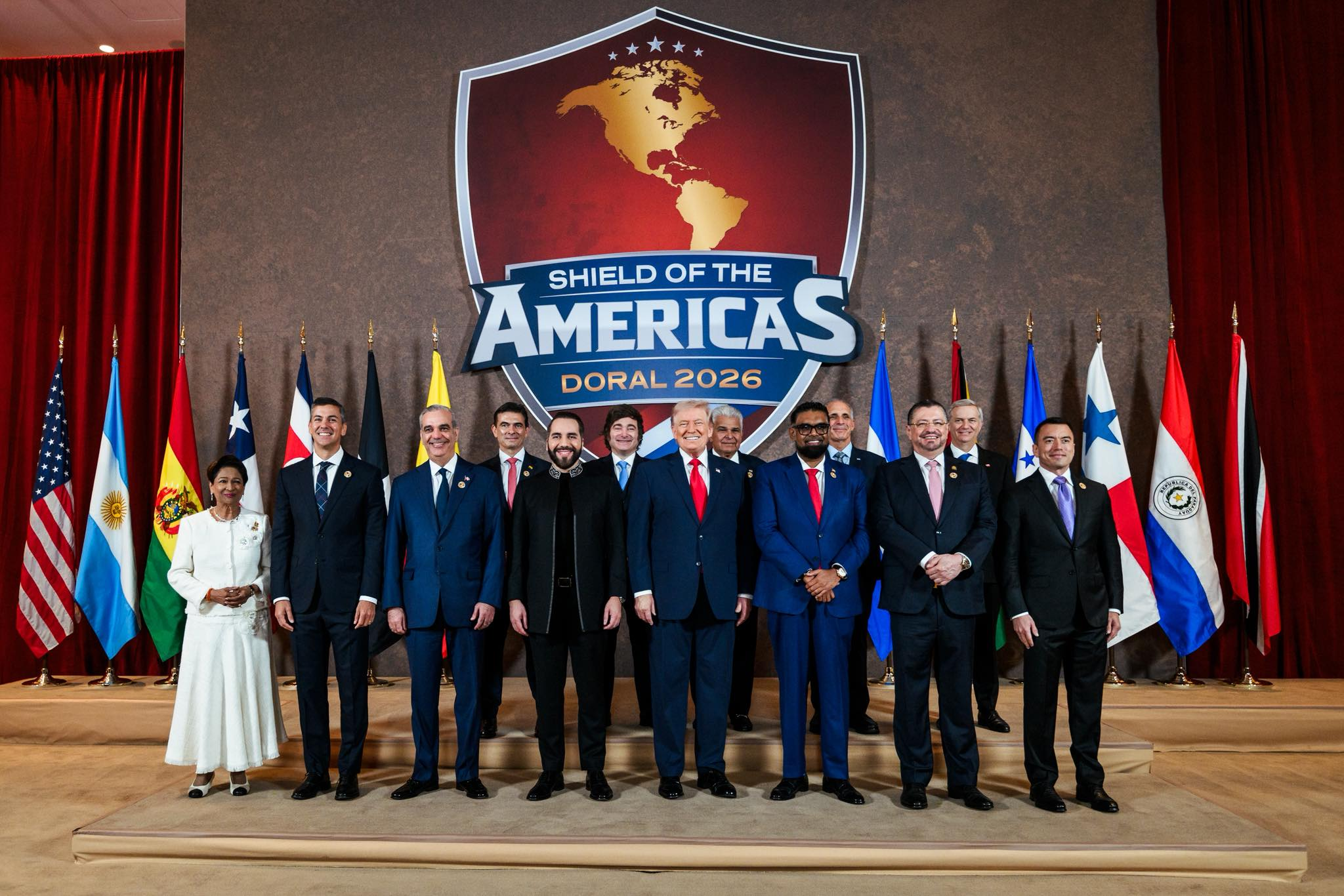
Leaders and representatives at the inaugural Shield of the Americas Summit in Doral on March 7, 2026

On March 7, President Trump convened the inaugural Shield of the Americas Summit at Trump National Doral Miami. The meeting brought together representatives of the countries that had signed the March 5 security declaration, with the exceptions of the Bahamas, Belize, Guatemala, Jamaica and Peru.

Chile, which had not signed the declaration, also participated, represented by president-elect José Antonio Kast, who had not yet taken office.

Chatham House described the inaugural summit as bringing together leaders whom Trump had praised or endorsed, alongside others whose governments supported his regional policies.

The summit focused on combating drug cartels and transnational organized crime, strengthening border security and immigration controls, and countering the influence of China, Russia and Iran in the Western Hemisphere. Trump offered U.S. military assistance against cartel leaders, including the possibility of precision missile strikes.

During the summit, Trump signed a proclamation calling for greater military cooperation against cartels and designated foreign terrorist organizations, including joint efforts to disrupt their financing, train regional armed forces and counter foreign influence in the hemisphere.

In his remarks, Trump described Mexico as the center of regional cartel activity, criticized President Claudia Sheinbaum's handling of organized crime and urged participating governments to take stronger action against criminal gangs. He also discussed ongoing U.S. military operations against Iran, warned the government of Cuba and addressed U.S. cooperation with Venezuela's post-Maduro authorities, particularly over oil.

=== JTF-WHEM and Panama forum ===
In the months after the summit, participating countries continued existing bilateral security cooperation with the United States while the U.S. government sought to develop a more permanent regional coordination mechanism.

On August 4, SOUTHCOM activated Joint Task Force Western Hemisphere (JTF-WHEM), describing it as a purpose-built joint headquarters for synchronizing U.S. military operations with allied and partner countries throughout the hemisphere. SOUTHCOM commander Gen. Francis L. Donovan selected Marine Corps Maj. Gen. Kevin Jarrard to command the task force. The command said JTF-WHEM would integrate intelligence, surveillance and reconnaissance, operational planning and multinational coordination while working with the 18 A3C partner nations.

On August 11–12, Panama hosted the second Americas Counter Cartel Coalition Forum. Ministers, chiefs of defense and senior security officials from the coalition discussed the development of operational plans, division of responsibilities and multinational working groups.

At the forum, Hegseth announced that Colombia, under president Abelardo de la Espriella, had joined the coalition, bringing its membership to 19 countries including the United States. Colombia had been absent from the inaugural Shield summit under former president Gustavo Petro.

The Panama forum coincided with PANAMAX 2026, a multinational military exercise focused on the defense of the Panama Canal and surrounding region. The conjunction of the forum with the exercise reflected the coalition's growing emphasis on existing U.S.-led training, interoperability and planning mechanisms rather than the creation of a new standing multinational force.

=== Peru and the September meeting ===
On September 7, Kristi Noem's six-month status as U.S. Special Envoy to the Shield of the Americas expired, leaving this position vacant.

Although Peru had signed the March 5 A3C security declaration, it had not participated in the inaugural heads-of-government Shield summit. On September 10, President Keiko Fujimori announced during a visit by secretary Marco Rubio that Peru would participate in the Shield of the Americas, emphasizing intelligence sharing and coordinated action against transnational criminal organizations.

U.S. president Donald Trump and Secretary of State Marco Rubio meeting Shield of the Americas heads of state and foreign ministers in New York City on September 22, 2026

On September 22, President Trump convened the second meeting of the Shield of the Americas in New York City during the 81st session of the United Nations General Assembly.

Participants in the summit adopted the Joint Statement on Defending Hemispheric Sovereignty, highlighting a new framework directed at 24 organizations already designated by the United States as foreign terrorist organizations. The statement expressed an intention, subject to each government's domestic and international legal obligations, to employ measures including asset freezes, immigration and visa restrictions and penalties for knowingly providing material or logistical support

The list included MS-13, Tren de Aragua, the Sinaloa Cartel, the Jalisco New Generation Cartel, the Gulf Cartel, Clan del Golfo, the National Liberation Army, several FARC dissident organizations, Shining Path, Brazil's Primeiro Comando da Capital and Comando Vermelho, and armed criminal organizations from Ecuador and Haiti.

The participating governments also said they intended to request a meeting of consultation within the Organization of American States under Articles 6 and 13 of the Rio Treaty to consider collective action against transnational criminal organizations.

The September meeting also had a domestic political consequence in Costa Rica. On September 24, President Laura Fernández dismissed Foreign Minister Manuel Tovar after he attended the meeting without informing her, which the Costa Rican government said prevented Fernández from attending herself. The government nevertheless reaffirmed the importance it attached to Costa Rican participation in the Shield.

== Structure ==
=== Leadership and coordination ===
Shield of the Americas:
Special Envoy for the Shield of the Americas; Vacant	Shield of the Americas Summit; Heads of state and government
Americas Counter Cartel Coalition:
Americas Counter Cartel Coalition Forum; Ministers/secretaries of defense and armed forces chiefs of staff
United States Southern Command; Commander: Gen. Francis Donovan, USMC	Joint Task Force Western Hemisphere; Commander: MG Kevin Jarrard, USMC
United States Armed Forces assigned to JTF-WHEM	A3C partner countries national armed forces and security agencies

Leadership and coordination of the Shield is currently distributed across several U.S. offices and institutions rather than concentrated in a single publicly identified multinational headquarters.

The Shield of the Americas Summit gathers heads of state or government from member countries. Its main goal is to discuss economic, security, and multilateral coordination within the region. Kristi Noem, appointed U.S. special envoy for the Shield of the Americas, diplomatically coordinates with governments participating in the Summit on behalf of the United States.

The Americas Counter Cartel Coalition Forum is the A3C's operational conference. Pete Hegseth chairs the Americas Counter Cartel Coalition and so far presided over its fora, including the second A3C Forum in Panama in August 2026. His role concerns ministerial-level defense coordination rather than direct command of participating countries' armed forces. These meetings include ministers of defense or public security, along with military chiefs of staff from member from member countries, who coordinate on related issues such as drug trafficking, organized crime, and threats to critical infrastructure.

During his speech on August 12 at the second A3C Forum, SOUTHCOM commander Gen. Francis Donovan announced that the coalition will refine priority network campaign plans, assign roles and lead countries, establish working groups with specific objectives and milestones, and begin coalition campaign assessments by November 2026.

Military coordination on the U.S. side is conducted principally through United States Southern Command (SOUTHCOM), commanded by Gen. Francis L. Donovan. In August 2026, SOUTHCOM established Joint Task Force Western Hemisphere (JTF-WHEM), commanded by Maj. Gen. Kevin Jarrard, to synchronize U.S. military operations and cooperation with regional partners. It serves as the unified command for the A3C, succeeding the role of Operation Southern Spear. Participating governments retain command of their own forces, while SOUTHCOM and JTF-WHEM provide much of the U.S. military infrastructure used for multinational planning. This includes the integration of intelligence, surveillance and reconnaissance, operational planning, and multinational coordination. Its goals include improving intelligence sharing, expanding joint training, enhancing interoperability, supporting maritime interdiction, building state capacity, and providing humanitarian aid or disaster response.

=== Participation ===
As of August 2026, the U.S. government described the A3C as comprising the United States and 18 partner nations. Fifteen governments subsequently issued the September 22 Shield statement. The difference reflects varying participation in the coalition's defense activities and high-level political meetings rather than a publicly defined system of separate membership classes.

Participation in major Shield and A3C events in 2026
Country	March 5 A3C declaration	March 7 Shield summit	A3C member by August	September 22 Shield statement
Argentina	Yes	Yes	Yes	Yes
Bahamas	Yes	—	Yes	—
Belize	Yes	—	Yes	—
Bolivia	Yes	Yes	Yes	Yes
Chile	—	Yes; Represented by president-elect José Antonio Kast, who had not yet taken office	Yes	Yes
Colombia	—	—	Yes	Yes
Costa Rica	Yes	Yes	Yes	Yes
Dominican Republic	Yes	Yes	Yes	Yes
Ecuador	Yes	Yes	Yes	Yes
El Salvador	Yes	Yes	Yes	Yes
Guatemala	Yes	—	Yes	—
Guyana	Yes	Yes	Yes	Yes
Honduras	Yes	Yes	Yes	Yes
Jamaica	Yes	—	Yes	—
Panama	Yes	Yes	Yes	Yes
Paraguay	Yes	Yes	Yes	Yes
Peru	Yes	—	Yes	Yes
Trinidad and Tobago	Yes	Yes	Yes	Yes
United States	Yes	Yes	Yes	Yes

Two of the hemisphere's largest countries, Brazil and Mexico, remained outside the coalition as of the September meeting. Flávio Bolsonaro intended to make Brazil join the coaliton if elected, but he was defeated by incumbent Lula da Silva, who is opposed to it.

=== Political alignment ===
The Shield and A3C have also been described by the U.S. and independent observers as a political coalition. This is an outgrowth of the November 2025 U.S. National Security Strategy’s hemispheric aim to “reward and encourage the region’s governments, political parties, and movements broadly aligned with our principles and strategy.” The Shield of the Americas is predominantly right-wing, albeit with some centre-left governments, like Guyanese President Irfaan Ali; most member countries' ruling parties are centre-right to far-right.

Several figures who are heads of government and/or state in the Shield have already been described as part of a pre-existing alliance through ideological affinity, rhetorical alignment, and a combination of participating in either CPAC, the Madrid Forum, or the Political Network for Values. Governments especially aligned ideologically with the second Trump administration are caudillistand right-wing populist—anti-establishment, autocratic, socially conservative, and personalist.

Most member governments share opposition to left-wing politics from social democracy to communism, mainstream media, and checks and balances on the executive branch. They are also socially conservative, being pro-life and opposed to LGBTQ and women's rights. Law and order also underlies their approach issues of internal security and public safety. Economically, they emphasize economic liberalism to limited government.

When discussing their shared identity at the ACCC’s inaugural conference, U.S. Secretary of Defense Pete Hegseth said member countries were “offspring of Western civilization,” united by “our heritage, our history and geography in this new world.” Focusing on the coalition’s aims, he posed “whether our nations will be and remain Western nations with distinct characteristics, Christian nations under God, proud of our shared heritage with strong borders and prosperous people, ruled…by law, order, and common sense,” contrasting this with “radical narco-communism and narco-tyranny, which threaten our people, borders and sovereign lands in the name of a false sovereignty or a false peace.”

== List of meetings ==
Shield of the Americas high-level meetings
No.	Date	Host	Location	Principal development
1	March 7, 2026	United States	Trump National Doral Miami, Doral, Florida	Inaugural leaders' summit and public launch of the Shield, with discussions focused on transnational criminal organizations, migration, regional security and foreign influence.
2	September 22, 2026	United States	United Nations Headquarters, New York City	Second high-level meeting; adoption of a broader agenda covering economic security, security cooperation and multilateral coordination, together with the announcement of coordinated measures concerning 24 organizations.

Americas Counter Cartel Coalition forums
No.	Date	Host	Location	Principal development
1	March 5, 2026	United States	United States Southern Command, Doral, Florida	Founding conference and signing of the Americas Counter Cartel Conference Joint Security Declaration by the United States and 16 partner governments.
2	August 11–12, 2026	Panama	Panama City	Second A3C Forum; development of operational plans and working groups, with Colombia announced as the coalition's 19th member.

== Reception and analysis ==
Following the inaugural summit, Chatham House Latin America Programme director Christopher Sabatini argued that the initiative was institutionally underdeveloped. He pointed to the absence of announced long-term burden-sharing arrangements, dedicated funding and mechanisms addressing corruption, weak institutions and socioeconomic factors associated with organized crime. Sabatini also argued that the initial selection of governments reflected political alignment with Trump and warned that a coalition built around the preferences of incumbent governments could be vulnerable to electoral change in the region.

Analysts at CSIS placed greater emphasis on the initiative's geopolitical significance, viewing the Shield as a possible vehicle for coordinating U.S.-aligned governments not only on organized crime but also on strategic competition with China, including infrastructure and economic-security issues. The September addition of investment screening, critical minerals and digital infrastructure subsequently incorporated several of those issues into the coalition's stated agenda.

Alejandro Martin Rodriguez and Kayly Ober of the Carnegie Endowment for International Peace criticized what they described as the coalition's heavy reliance on "hard security". They argued that Hard power-centered strategies risked overlooking institutional weakness, economic insecurity and environmental pressures that can facilitate illicit economies and recruitment by criminal organizations.

== See also ==
- Inter-American Treaty of Reciprocal Assistance
- Joint Interagency Task Force South
- Joint Task Force Western Hemisphere
- Latin America–United States relations
- Monroe Doctrine
- Operation Southern Spear
- Organization of American States
- School of the Americas
- United States Southern Command
