= United States military buildup in the Caribbean during Operation Southern Spear =

- Part of Operation Southern Spear, the post–Cold War era, the war on terror, the war on cartels, the Mexican drug war, and the crisis in Venezuela
- An infographic for the conflict, including approximate locations of American forces and approximate locations of airstrikes
- Location: Caribbean Sea
- Planned by: United States
- Commanded by: Lieutenant General Evan Pettus (acting); Alvin Holsey (until December 2025)
- Objective: Combat drug trafficking (US Claim); Regime change; Acquisition of nationalized Venezuelan oil and land resources by US corporations (Venezuelan Claim)
- Date: August 14, 2025 – present (1 year, 3 months and 6 days)
- Executed by: United States; United States Department of Defense; United States Southern Command (SOUTHCOM); United States Armed Forces; United States Navy; United States Fourth Fleet; United States Air Force; 158th Fighter Wing; United States Marine Corps; 22nd Marine Expeditionary Unit (SOC); United States Army; United States Army Special Operations Command; 1st Special Forces Operational Detachment-Delta (Delta Force); U.S. Army Special Operations Aviation Command; 160th Special Operations Aviation Regiment (Airborne); Military of Puerto Rico; Roosevelt Roads Naval Station; United States Department of Homeland Security; United States Coast Guard; Maritime Security Response Team; United States Intelligence Community; Central Intelligence Agency; United States Department of Justice; Federal Bureau of Investigation; FBI Hostage Rescue Team; United States Drug Enforcement Administration; Other participants: Dominican Republic; Armed Forces of the Dominican Republic; Dominican Navy; Trinidad and Tobago
- Casualties: As of 9 September 2026, in the Caribbean Sea, 89 individuals killed 1 "noncombat" Marine killed

In late August 2025, the United States began a naval buildup in the southern Caribbean with the stated goal of combating drug trafficking. US president Donald Trump directed the United States Armed Forces to begin using military force against certain Latin American drug cartels, characterizing the smugglers as narcoterrorists. The first major increase came with the deployment of the USS Iwo Jima and its amphibious ready group in August. The arrival of the USS Gerald R. Ford carrier strike group in November marked the second increase. A sharper escalation came in mid-December, when the US began intercepting and seizing crude oil tankers, imposed a naval quarantine on sanctioned vessels transporting oil to or from Venezuela, and announced plans to designate the Venezuelan government a Foreign Terrorist Organization.

The first operation of the campaign was the strike and sinking of a vessel—coming from Venezuela and purportedly involving Tren de Aragua gang members carrying illegal drugs—in September that killed 11 people. As the US continued the buildup of military assets to Puerto Rico and El Salvador, subsequent airstrikes destroyed other alleged drug-smuggling vessels, including those allegedly connected to the Colombian National Liberation Army. The Dominican Navy engaged to recover drugs from one of the destroyed vessels, and Trinidad and Tobago backed the US. By early November, the deployment of assets to the Caribbean region had become the largest in decades. US defense secretary Pete Hegseth announced Operation Southern Spear would begin later in November, with a fleet using robotics and autonomous systems to target Latin American drug trafficking.

Experts, the Trump administration, and Venezuelan opposition sources stated that a likely goal of the operation is to force the departure of top figures in the Nicolás Maduro government. By the end of November 2025, the Cartel of the Suns—which the US alleges is headed by Maduro, and Maduro denies—was designated as a Foreign Terrorist Organization, allowing for expanded US options, and in late December, the US made its first strike on a target within Venezuela. The buildup culminated in a series of strikes on Venezuelan military and civilian air infrastructure, and the capture of Maduro by the US armed forces in a predawn raid on 3 January 2026. Maduro contends the US is after Venezuela's oil; Trump does not dispute this.

== Background ==
In 1989, President Bush ordered the invasion of Panama to depose the country's de facto dictator, Manuel Noriega. The invasion was condemned by the United Nations General Assembly as a "flagrant violation of international law". The US later provided intelligence about flights with civilians suspected of carrying drugs to Colombian and Peruvian officials; after several planes were shot down, the Clinton administration ceased its assistance in providing information. According to the United States Navy, the United States Coast Guard regularly works with the Navy to intercept ships believed to be used for drug smuggling operations. The United States Armed Forces broadly engage in joint anti-drug training exercises with other countries, including Colombia and Mexico.

During the presidency of George W. Bush, the AUMF Act and the Specially Designated Global Terrorist designation in the context of the war on terror laid the groundwork for subsequent classifications.

President of Venezuela Nicolás Maduro was originally indicted in the US on drug charges including narcoterrorism in 2020.

=== Preliminary actions ===
In January 2025, US President Donald Trump signed Executive Order 14157 that directed the US State Department to label certain Western Hemisphere drug cartels as Foreign Terrorist Organizations and Specially Designated Global Terrorists. In February, the Trump administration designated Tren de Aragua, a criminal organization from Venezuela; MS-13; and six Mexico-based groups as foreign terrorist organizations, saying at the time they posed "a national-security threat beyond that posed by traditional organized crime".

In July, the US designated the Cartel of the Suns (Cartel de los Soles)—a criminal organization that the US alleges has ties to the Venezuelan leadership—as a Specially Designated Global Terrorist. At the time, the US State Department's Bureau of Western Hemisphere Affairs posted on X that it would use "all the resources at our disposal to prevent Maduro from continuing to profit from destroying American lives and destabilizing our hemisphere". US intelligence assessments have repeatedly contradicted claims made by the Trump administration in legal filings that Maduro controlled Tren de Aragua.

The "terrorist organization" designation for Sinaloa Cartel, the Jalisco New Generation Cartel, Cártel del Noreste, Tren de Aragua, MS-13, the Gulf Cartel, and La Nueva Familia Michoacana Organization established the foundation for US intervention. In July, Trump secretly signed an executive order directing the armed forces to invoke military action against cartels that had been declared as terrorist organizations.

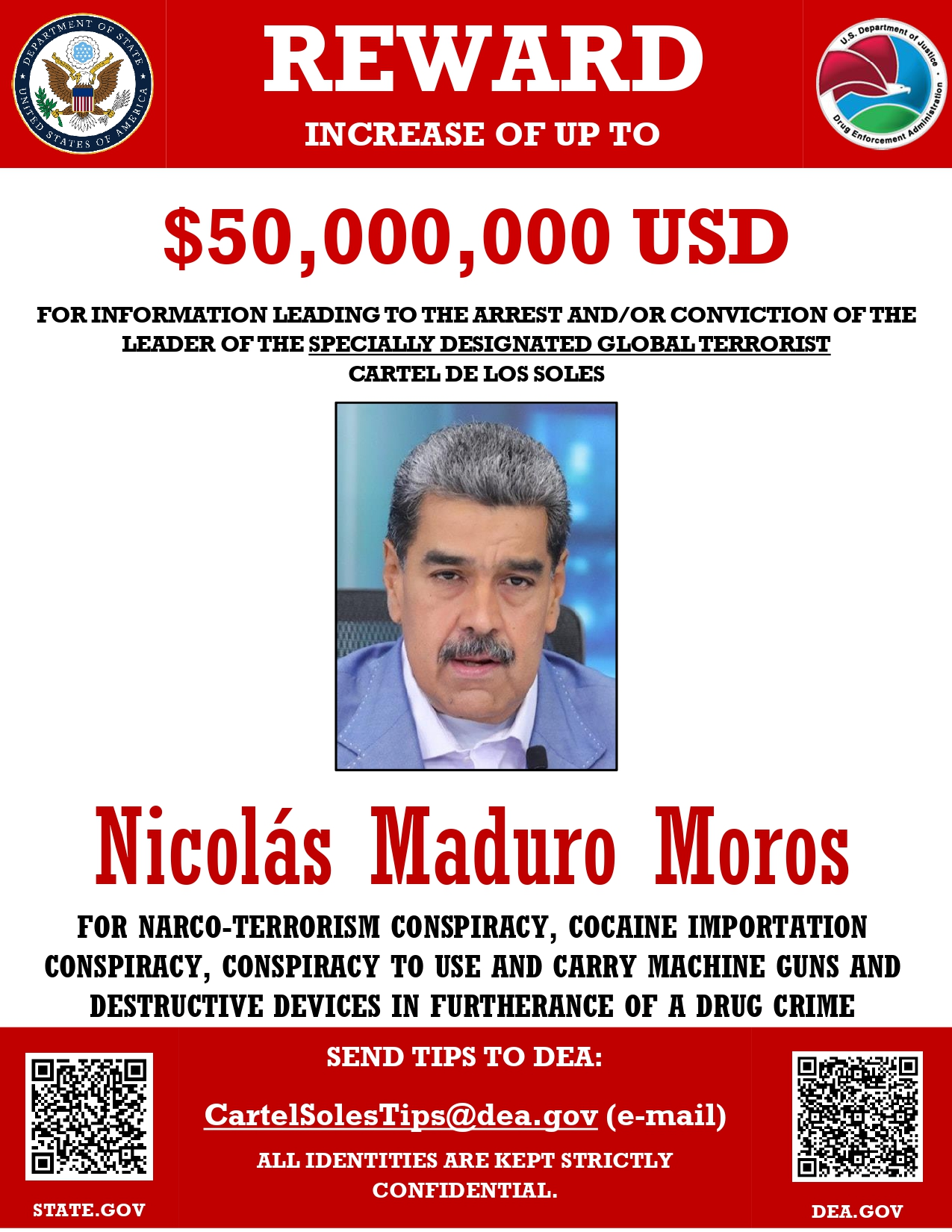
A DEA poster with a US$50 million reward for Venezuelan president Nicolás Maduro

After authorizing the Pentagon to use military force against Latin American drug cartels, the Trump administration doubled the reward for the capture of Maduro to US$50 million. At the time, an anonymous US official told Reuters that military action against those groups did not seem imminent; another official told Reuters that powers granted in the order included allowing the Navy to carry out sea operations including drug interdiction and targeted military raids.

In August 2025, the US began deploying warships and personnel to the Caribbean, citing the need to combat drug cartels, although most of the fentanyl entering the US is over land via Mexico. On 20 August, Trump ordered three Navy warships to the coast of South America. As of 29 August, seven US warships, along with one nuclear-powered fast attack submarine, were in and around the Southern Caribbean, bringing along more than 4,500 sailors and marines.

The Central Intelligence Agency joined the military campaign after confirming that it would play a significant role in combating drug cartels, just as it is considering using lethal force against these criminal organizations.

In response to this tension in United States–Venezuela relations, Venezuela said it would mobilize more than four million soldiers in the Bolivarian Militia. On 26 August, Defense Minister Vladimir Padrino López announced a naval deployment around Venezuela's main oil hub. Maduro said he "would constitutionally declare a republic in arms" if the country were attacked by the US forces deployed in the Caribbean.

== Initial deployment and airstrikes ==
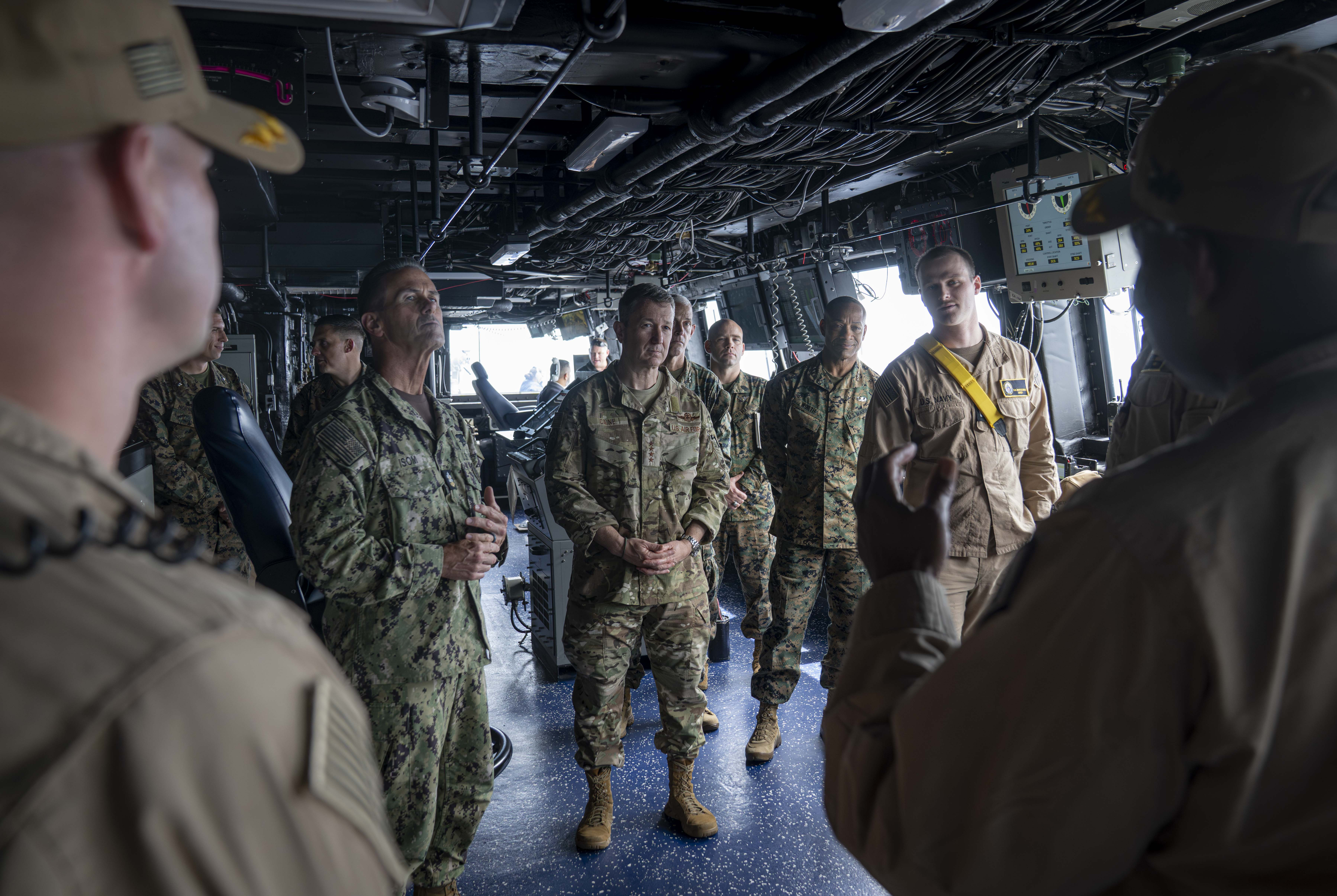
General Dan Caine and Senior Enlisted Advisor to the Chairman David Isom meet with sailors and Marines aboard the USS Iwo Jima in the Caribbean Sea, 8 September 2025

According to The Economist, the US typically has "two or three American warships and Coast Guard cutters" on patrol in the southern Caribbean. As of 25 September 2025, the deployment included ten ships: the guided-missile destroyers USS Gravely, USS Stockdale (Note: USS Stockdale replaced the USS Sampson by 23 September.) and USS Jason Dunham; the amphibious assault ship USS Iwo Jima and the amphibious transport docks USS San Antonio and USS Fort Lauderdale; the guided-missile cruiser USS Lake Erie; the littoral combat ship USS Minneapolis-Saint Paul; (Note: USS Minneapolis—Saint Paul returned to Naval Station Mayport in October 2025.) the nuclear fast attack submarine USS Newport News, and the special operations ship MV Ocean Trader. According to the Financial Times, "Five of the eight vessels are equipped with Tomahawk missiles, which can hit land targets." On 25 September, Task & Purpose reported that the US had deployed special operations ship MV Ocean Trader to the Caribbean.

The Iwo Jima, Fort Lauderdale, and San Antonio of the Iwo Jima Amphibious Ready Group left Norfolk, Virginia, on 14 August, with more than 4,000 personnel, including the 22nd Marine Expeditionary Unit, with 2,200 Marines. (Note: Reuters, "about 4,000 sailors and Marines"; Navy Times/Associated Press, "more than 4,000 sailors and Marines"; The New York Times, "The Iwo Jima Amphibious Ready Group—including the U.S.S. San Antonio, the U.S.S. Iwo Jima and the U.S.S. Fort Lauderdale, carrying 4,500 sailors—was steaming near Puerto Rico on Friday, Defense Department officials said. So was the 22nd Marine Expeditionary Unit, with 2,200 Marines"; The Guardian, "... involves the Iwo Jima amphibious ready group—including the USS San Antonio, the USS Iwo Jima and the USS Fort Lauderdale carrying 4,500 sailors—and the 22nd Marine Expeditionary Unit, with 2,200 marines";Task and Purpose, "... includes about 1,900 sailors with the Iwo Jima Amphibious Ready Group—which consists of assault ship USS Iwo Jima, the amphibious transport docks USS San Antonio and USS Fort Lauderdale — and another 2,200 Marines with the 22nd Marine Expeditionary Unit, who are embarked on the three ships.") According to the US Naval Institute this marked "the first time a US-based Amphibious Ready Group with embarked Marines has deployed since December." Historian Alan McPherson stated that the naval buildup is the largest in the region since 1965.

During a surprise trip on 8 September to Puerto Rico with Joint Chiefs of Staff Chairman Dan Caine, Defense Secretary Pete Hegseth told sailors and Marines assigned to the area: "What you're doing right now – it's not training ... This is the real-world exercise on behalf of the vital national interests of the United States of America to end the poisoning of the American people."

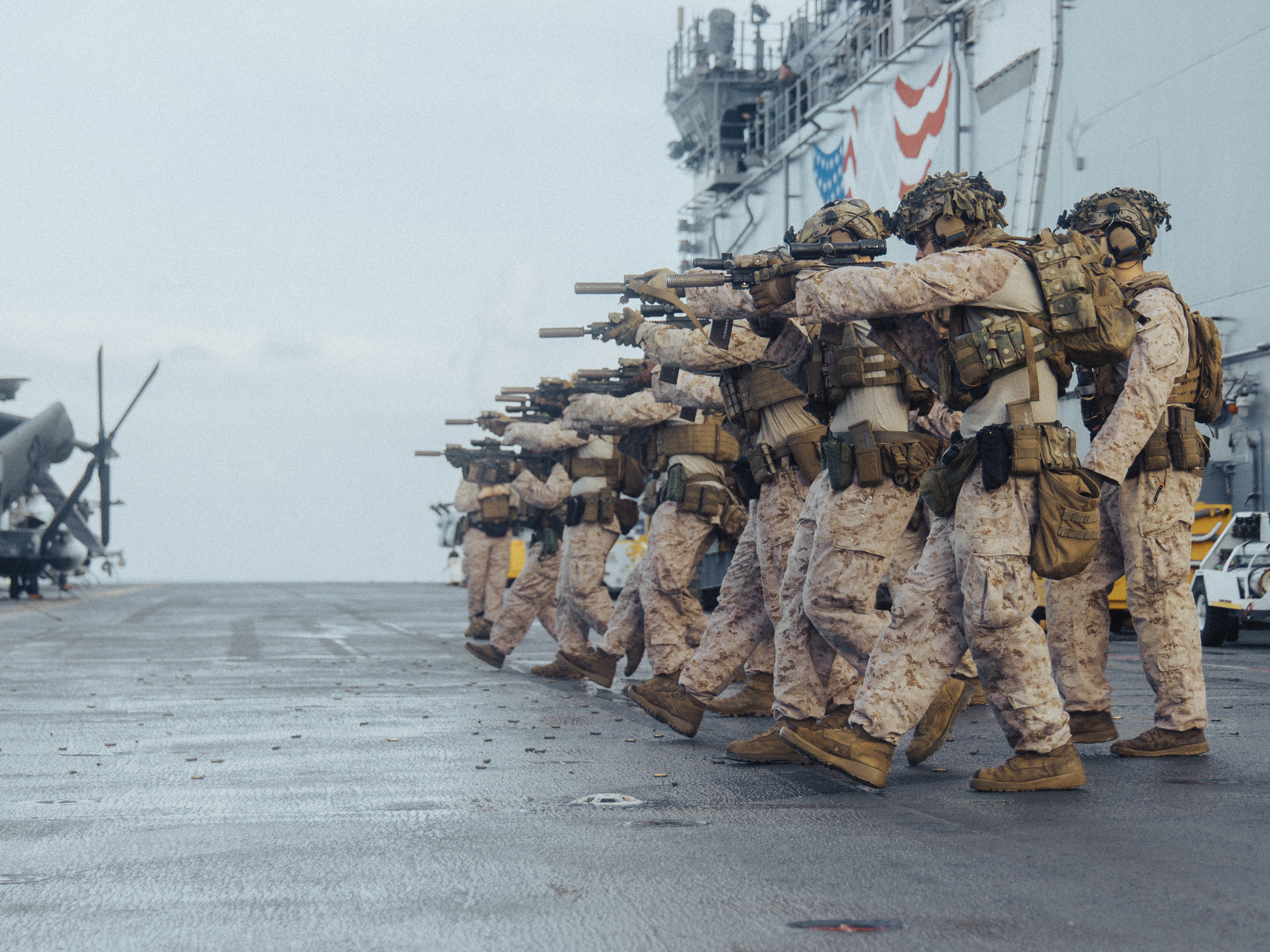
US Marines conduct live fire drills aboard USS Iwo Jima in the Caribbean Sea, 17 September 2025

In response to the presence of Navy warships in Latin America, two Venezuelan BMA F-16 fighter jets flew over the USS Jason Dunham on 4 September. The US Department of Defense called it "highly provocative" and deployed ten F-35 fighter jets and two MQ-9 Reaper drones to Puerto Rico. That same day Marco Rubio, the US Secretary of State, met with President of Ecuador Daniel Noboa in Quito; Rubio stated that Trump intended to "wage war" on those that have "been waging war on us for 30 years" and designated the gangs Los Lobos and Los Choneros as narco terrorists, with Noboa's agreement. On 23 September, the United States added the 18th Street gang, which is largely based in the Caribbean coastal nations of Guatemala and Honduras, to the designated foreign terrorists list.

The Venezuelan government stated on 12 September that a US destroyer had detained and boarded a tuna fishing boat with nine crew members. The destroyer eventually released the boat, and it was escorted away by the Venezuelan Navy. Minister of Foreign Affairs Yván Gil described the act as illegal and said that Venezuela would defend itself.

=== Airstrikes on vessels ===
Footage of a United States strike on a Venezuelan boat, September 2025

On 2 September 2025, Trump said that the US had struck a boat carrying unspecified illegal drugs, alleging it was operated by the Tren de Aragua. Trump said that the strike killed 11 "narcoterrorists". On 28 November, it was revealed that two men who survived the initial strike were killed in subsequent strikes.

A second strike occurred on 15 September, killing three. The US government did not provide evidence that those killed in either strike were narco-trafficking.

In a third strike on 19 September that killed three, the Dominican Republic later stated it had cooperated with the US Navy in a first-ever joint operation to locate the boat and salvage 377 packages of cocaine, weighing 1,000 kilograms (2,200 lb).

On 3 October, a strike on a vessel near the coast of Venezuela killed four; anonymous US officials later declared that there were Colombians on at least one of the boats.

Trump stated on 14 October that six more were killed in a strike near the coast of Venezuela.

Reuters reported that another previously unannounced strike on 16 October had killed two and included two survivors who were being held on a Navy ship. By 19 October, both were repatriated to their respective countries of origin, Colombia and Ecuador.

On 17 October, three were killed in a strike on an alleged drug vessel operated by the National Liberation Army (ELN) of Colombia. The ELN denied involvement in any drug boat trafficking.

The first strike at night, on 24 October against an alleged drug vessel operated by Tren de Aragua in the Caribbean, killed six. A strike on 2 November killed three, a strike on 6 November killed three, and a strike on 10 November killed four. A 13 February 2026 strike on a Designated Terrorist Organization vessel killed three. A 23 February strike killed three. A 25 March strike killed four. By June 2026 an estimated 210 people had been killed in U.S. military boat strikes.

=== Declaration of armed conflict ===
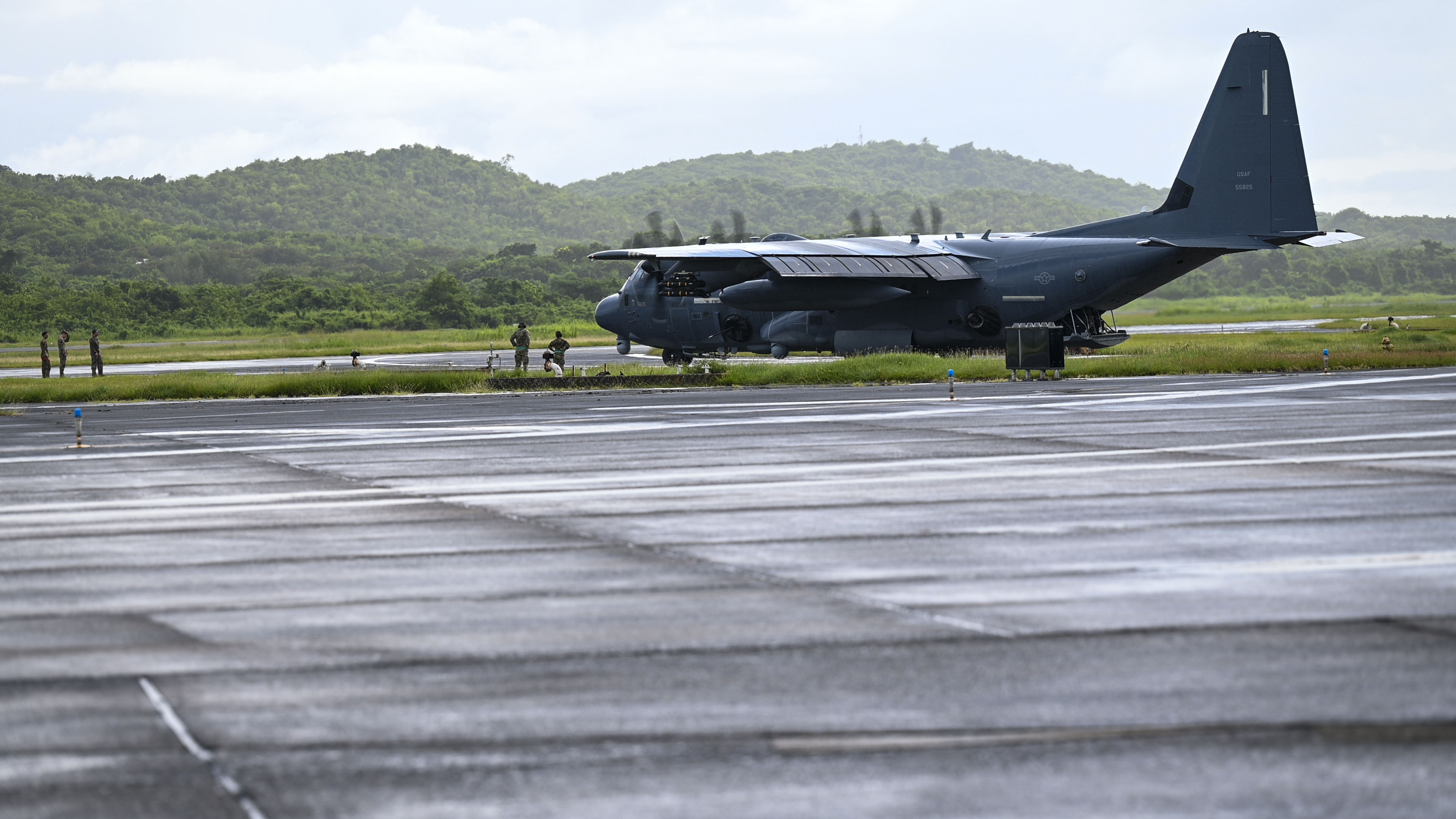
US Air Force AC-130J Ghostrider parks on an apron in Ceiba, Puerto Rico, 6 October 2025

On 30 September, Trump told reporters his administration would "look very seriously at cartels coming by land", which according to the Miami Herald "align[s] with recent media reports suggesting the administration is reviewing plans for targeted operations inside Venezuela."

Trump formally declared to Congress on 1 October that the US was in a "non-international armed conflict" with "unlawful combatants" regarding drug cartels operating in the Caribbean. The Guardian stated that the memo to Congress referred to the cartels as "non-state armed groups" engaged in attacking the US. Andrew C. McCarthy stated in the National Review that this terminology refers to a conflict "that does not pit two sovereign nations against each other" and means "armed hostilities conducted by a subnational entity that is not acting on behalf of a foreign sovereign", giving the example of Al-Qaeda and the attacks of 11 September. The Miami Herald wrote that: "In an armed conflict, a country can lawfully kill enemy fighters even when they pose no threat." The Washington Post stated: "Some lawmakers and experts have said the notification is a dubious legal justification for what have been unlawful military strikes on alleged civilian criminals".

Vladimir Padrino López, Venezuela's Minister of Defense, stated on 2 October that five US "combat planes" had been detected flying near Venezuela at 35,000 feet (11,000 m) altitude, which he called a "provocation"; a government statement said the plane was 75 kilometers (47 mi) from the Venezuelan coast, which CNN states is outside of Venezuelan territory.

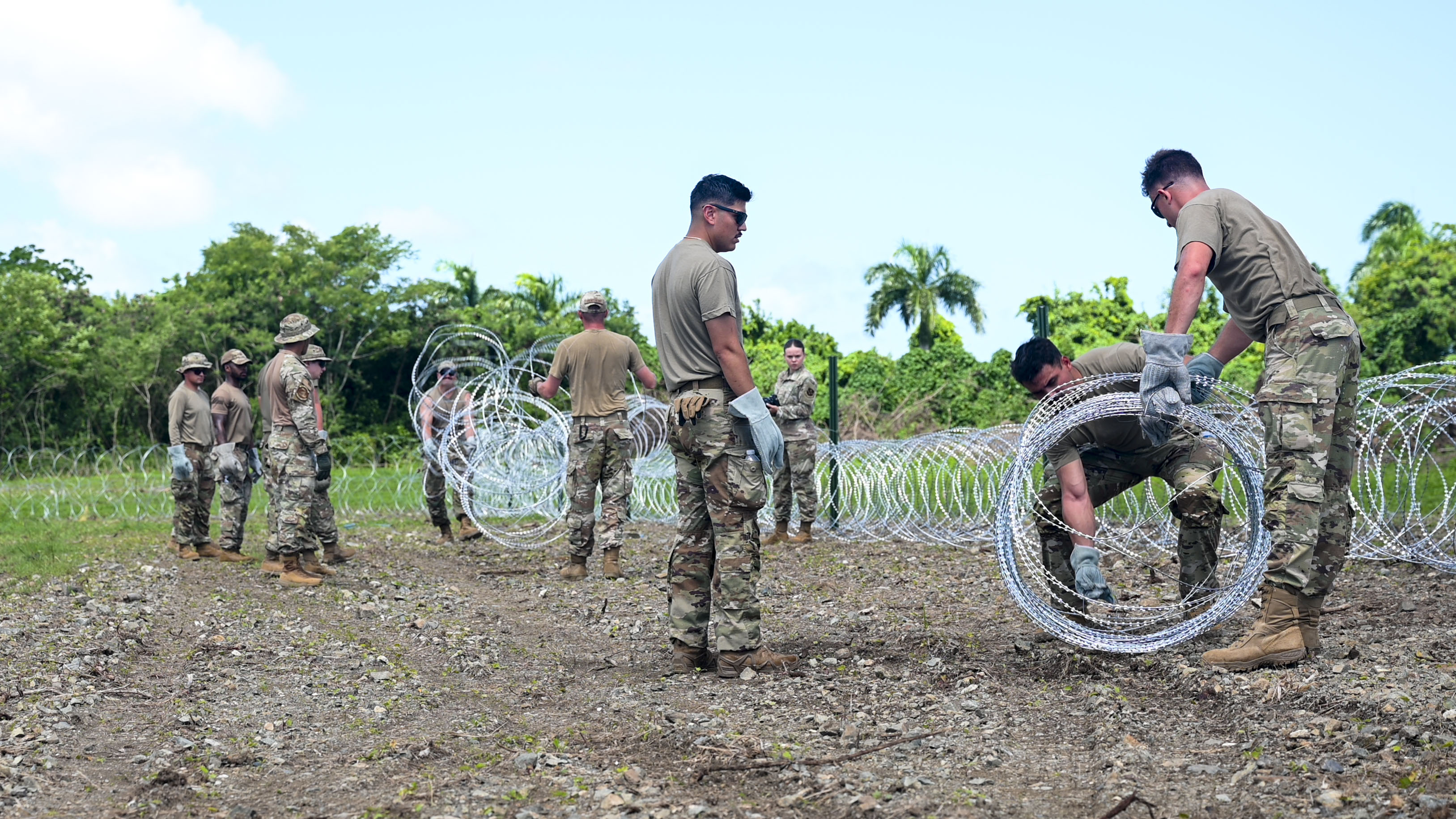
US Airmen assigned to the 346th Air Expeditionary Wing assemble concertina wire in Ceiba, Puerto Rico, 14 October 2025

The US Air Force participated amid the campaign on 15 October 2025 when airmen flew B-52 Stratofortress ("a long-range, heavy bomber that can carry precision-guided ordnance or nuclear weapons") north of Caracas for two hours, joining F-35B Lightning II from the Marines, in a "bomber attack demonstration mission", according to Task & Purpose. On 23 October, at least two US Air Force B-1B Lancers from Dyess Air Force Base, supported by KC-135 tankers from MacDill Air Force Base and an unknown type variant of RC-135 reconnaissance aircraft, conducted a flyby reportedly within 50 miles (80 km) of the Venezuelan mainland. When asked at a press conference about the B-1 flyby, Trump denied that the event had occurred. Also on 23 October, an Air Force E-11A Battlefield Airborne Communications Node (BACN) aircraft was observed operating near Puerto Rico.

According to a visual investigation report by The New York Times, satellite imagery and other data revealed the US began operating aircraft out of El Salvador in mid-October.

Reuters reported in November that the US military began construction to renovate Roosevelt Roads, a naval base in Puerto Rico that was abandoned in 2004. Upgrades include taxiway improvements that "would enable use by fighter jets as well as cargo planes", according to analysts. Changes were also observed at Rafael Hernandez Airport in Puerto Rico and Henry E. Rohlsen Airport, a civilian airport on the nearby island of St. Croix in the United States Virgin Islands.

=== End of diplomatic effort ===
Prior to the US naval deployment, Richard Grenell, Trump's special envoy to Venezuela, had been working towards a deal with Maduro's administration. After extended talks, Maduro's aides had reportedly offered American companies preference in contracts and access to all oil and gold ventures within the country, and to sharply reduce export ties with China, Iran, and Russia. Maduro knew that "loosening those alliances was an inevitable price for avoiding American military intervention", a source told The New York Times. Some concessions were made as talks continued; in May 2025, Venezuela agreed to release Joseph St. Clair, a US Air Force veteran who had been "wrongfully detained" by Venezuelan security forces, according to the US State Department. Chevron's license to operate in Venezuela under US sanctions, revoked by Trump in February, was reinstated in July 2025. Preliminary efforts to allow Shell to restart work in Venezuela also began. Rubio strongly opposed Grenell's "resource diplomacy" approach, stating that "Chevron's continued operations in Venezuela legitimize and enable Maduro's grip on power".

On 6 October, Trump directed Grenell to shut down all diplomatic talks with Venezuela amid growing tensions and frustrations with Venezuelan political dialogue. Since at least April 2025, Qatar had acted as a political go-between, attempting to maintain communications between the two nations through back-channel diplomacy.

Sources told the Miami Herald that Qatar, which "has close ties to the Venezuelan government", had "played a key role as intermediary" between Maduro officials and siblings Delcy and Jorge Rodríguez in promoting Delcy and the unrelated Miguel Rodríguez Torres to lead a transition as "a 'more acceptable' alternative to Nicolás Maduro's regime", with the aim of "preserving political stability without dismantling the ruling apparatus". The Associated Press confirmed the report, and stated that an anonymous official said the proposal was that Maduro be replaced by Delcy through the end of his term in 2031; the AP reported that Washington "rejected the proposal because it continues to question the legitimacy of Maduro's rule". Maduro and Delcy Rodríguez labeled the information as fake news, with the latter saying the report was part of a psychological warfare operation.

== Escalation ==
Initially positioned as a mission to stop narcotics traffic to the US, by mid-October 2025, Venezuelan opposition figures and independent analysts confirmed a shift in US objectives toward regime change, with Trump acknowledging the possibility of strikes within Venezuelan territory.

On 15 October, Trump confirmed he had authorized the CIA to conduct lethal ground operations inside Venezuela and elsewhere around the Caribbean, and that military officials were drafting options for strikes on Venezuelan territory. Trump related the decision to illegal immigration to the United States and narcotraffic saying: "Number one, they have emptied their prisons into the United States of America. They came in through the, well, they came in through the border ... And the other thing are drugs, we have a lot of drugs coming in from Venezuela." The New York Times reported the next day that Alvin Holsey would retire as head of USSOUTHCOM, with anonymous sources reporting tension between Holsey and the Trump administration over the legality of the strikes.

The destroyer Gravely arrived on 26 October 2025 to spend four days in Trinidad and Tobago, where their country's forces would jointly train with US Marines. In late November, the US installed a radar system in the island nation. In December, Trinidad and Tobago approved military aircraft from the US to use the country's airports for operations that are "logistical in nature".

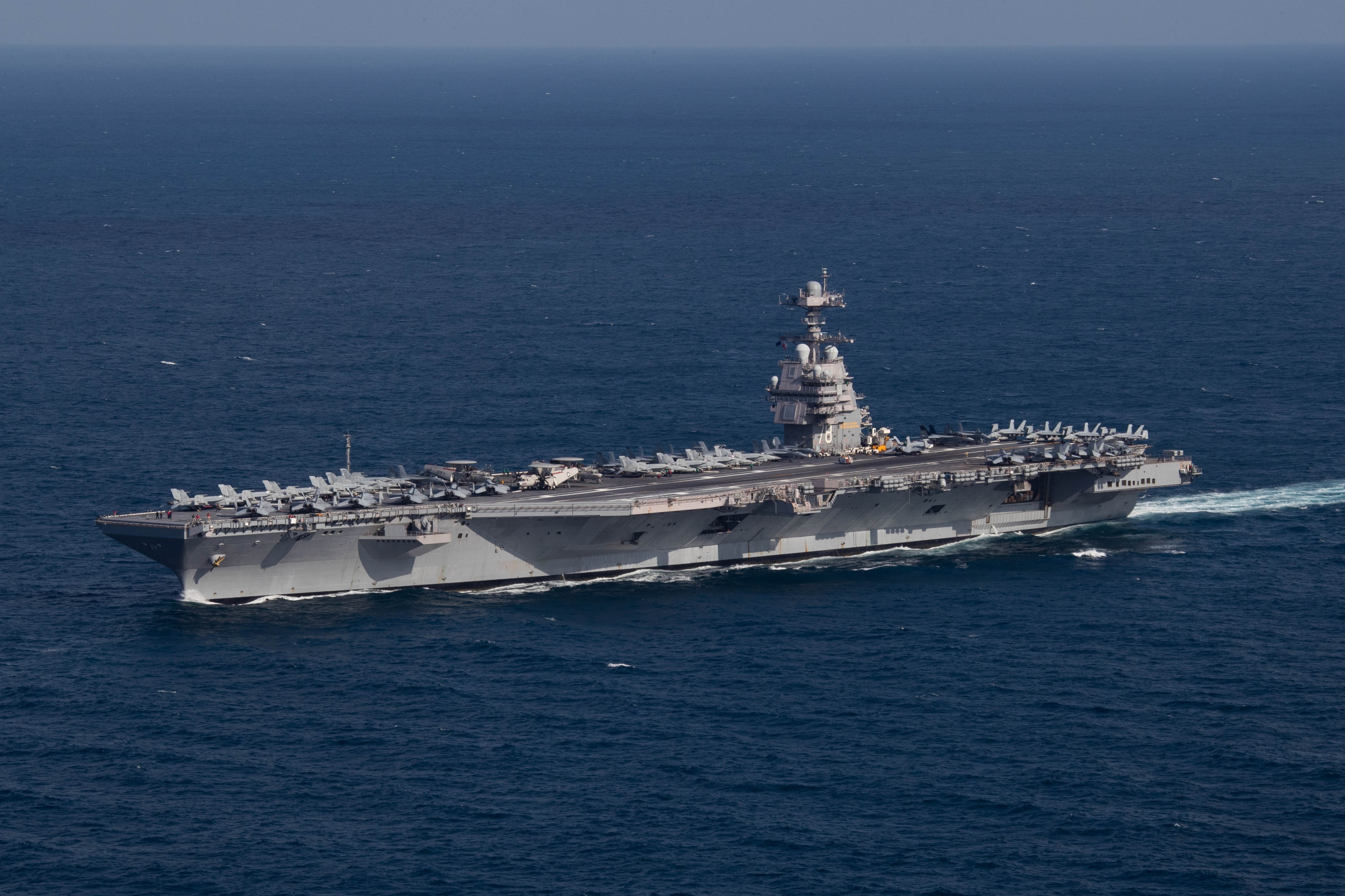
USS Gerald R. Ford

Hegseth ordered the supercarrier USS Gerald R. Ford deployed to Latin America on 24 October. According to The Washington Post, it is "the world's largest aircraft carrier" and its deployment "signaled a major expansion of [the] military campaign against 'Transnational Criminal Organizations' in Latin America". The New York Times reported it "carries about 5,000 sailors and has more than 75 attack, surveillance and support aircraft, including F/A-18 fighters". The Ford's full air wing is reportedly embarked. Though its escort typically includes five Arleigh Burke class destroyers—USS Winston S. Churchill, USS Bainbridge, USS Mahan, USS Forrest Sherman and USS Mitscher—as of 8 November the USS Forrest Sherman and Mitscher were still operating independently in other areas of the globe (such as the Red Sea).

On 26 October, a Russian Il-76 transport aircraft under US sanctions landed in Venezuela "after a circuitous route over Africa to avoid Western airspace, according to Flightradar24". The aircraft carried Pantsir-S1 and Buk-M2E air defense systems, according to a Russian official.

As of 31 October, Gettysburg (CG-64), another guided missile cruiser, had joined the fleet.

=== Number of troops deployed ===
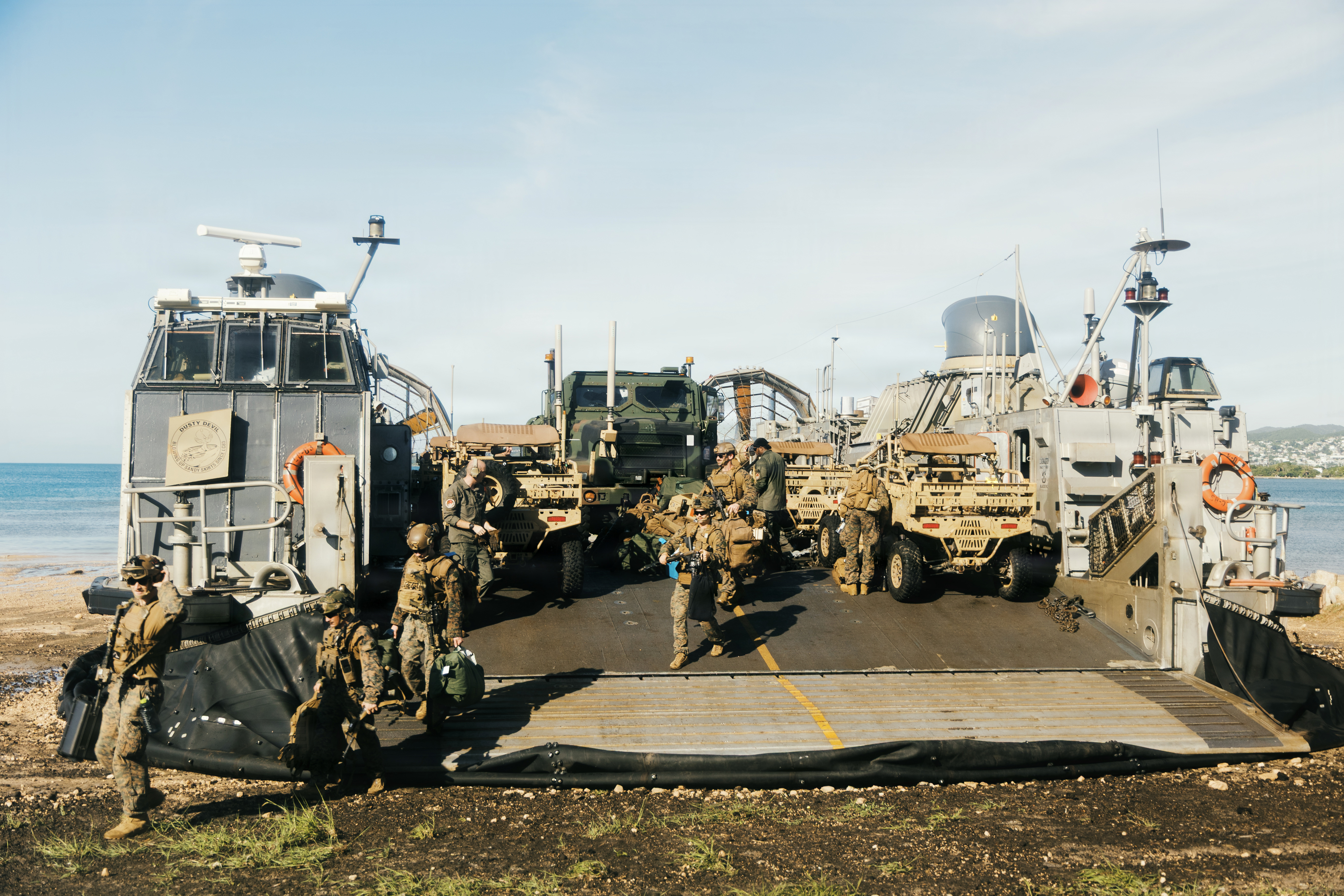
3rd Battalion, 6th Marines of the 22nd Marine Expeditionary Unit offload equipment from a Landing Craft Air Cushion in Ponce, Puerto Rico, 29 November 2025

As of 28 October, the number of US troops in the Southern Caribbean and Puerto Rico had expanded to 10,000, with about half in Puerto Rico and half on vessels. US military assets in the region are insufficient for an invasion. The forces included elements of the 160th Special Operations Aviation Regiment which provides helicopter aviation support for special operations forces. Venezuela's armed forces are estimated at 125,000 as of October 2025, with experts saying its military is "in shambles" according to The Wall Street Journal, which wrote on 17 October that Venezuela had issued a call to arms, and "cranked up its propaganda machine", announcing that the US wanted its oil wealth, as Venezuela was moving troops to the coast and prepared to "repel any invasion".

With the 11 November arrival of USS Gerald R. Ford and its escorts to the USSOUTHCOM region, the US had about 15,000 personnel in the area, described by The Washington Post as "a stunning military presence in a region that historically has seen only one or two Navy vessels assisting the U.S. Coast Guard on routine drug-interdiction missions".

Reuters reported on 2 November 2025 that: "The military buildup in the region is the largest unrelated to disaster relief since 1994, when the United States sent two aircraft carriers and more than 20,000 troops to Haiti" during Operation Uphold Democracy.

=== Joint Task Force Southern Spear ===
Hegseth had announced on 10 October the formation of a new counternarcotics joint task force, to operate in Latin America, the Western hemisphere, and the area of the United States Southern Command (USSOUTHCOM), to be headed by the II Marine Expeditionary Force, intended "to crush the cartels, stop the poison and keep America safe". On 13 November 2025, Hegseth announced the unveiling of Operation Southern Spear, led by Joint Task Force Southern Spear and using a fleet with robotics and autonomous systems to target Latin American drug trafficking, with operations to begin later in November.

A US official told a reporter in November that Hegseth's 13 November unveiling was "a formal operation naming for what the Joint Task Force Southern Spear ... and Southcom have already been doing in theater".

=== Airspace restrictions ===
At the direction of the US Department of Defense, the US Federal Aviation Administration (FAA) banned flights in an area around Ceiba, Puerto Rico, for "special security reasons" from 1 November 2025 to 31 March 2026.

On 21 November, the FAA urged airlines flying over Venezuela at any altitude to exercise caution due to the "worsening security situation and heightened military activity in or around Venezuela". Increased GPS interference, linked to military action by both the US and Venezuela, made flight dangerous; by 25 November, at least eleven airlines had temporarily suspended flights to Venezuela. After threatening to permanently suspend the clearances of airlines that did not resume flights within 48 hours, on 26 November, Venezuela revoked the licenses of six airlines they said had "joined actions of state terrorism promoted by the United States".

While Venezuela has authority over its airspace, on 29 November, Trump announced that airspace over the country should be considered entirely closed, days after he stated that the US would begin to strike land targets "very soon". The Washington Post stated that "such a move is sometimes a first step ahead of airstrikes"; while Trump cannot legally close Venezuela's airspace and he did not impose a no-fly zone, the "threat ... might be enough to prompt commercial airlines to halt flights over Venezuela". Venezuelan officials condemned Trump's statement as a "colonialist threat", stating that Venezuela rejects "orders, threats, or interference from any foreign power".

=== Land targets in Venezuela and terrorist designations ===
On 22 October, Trump said that he planned to also order strikes on land targets. The Wall Street Journal reported on 30 October 2025 that the US had identified land "targets that sit at the nexus of the drug gangs and the Maduro regime", including facilities such as ports and airstrips that the Venezuelan military allegedly uses for drug trafficking, without providing evidence to the press. Trump denied a Miami Herald report that the "Trump Administration [had] made the decision to attack military installations inside Venezuela". On 31 October 2025, Newsweek reported that US ships were positioned near the Venezuelan military base at La Orchila Island, "within immediate operational range for amphibious or precision strike missions".

The US Southern Command posted videos of live-fire drills by US Marines; satellite imagery confirmed the location to be the USS Iwo Jima, situated less than 200 kilometres (120 mi) off the coast of Venezuela and accompanied by two other USS destroyers.

The US State Department designated Cartel of the Suns a Foreign Terrorist Organization effective 24 November 2025. The Miami Herald wrote: "The designation would effectively label Maduro and senior officials, including Interior Minister Diosdado Cabello and Defense Minister Vladimir Padrino López, as terrorists." The Trump administration said the designation "allows the US military the ability to target Maduro's assets and infrastructure inside Venezuela".

A phone call between Trump and Maduro, including Rubio, occurred later in November, according to The New York Times. Unnamed sources told the Miami Herald that, in the call, Trump offered safe passage for Maduro and his immediate family, but the discussion stalled because Maduro would not agree to leave quickly, wanted "global amnesty for any crimes he and his group had committed", and wanted to retain control over Venezuela's military.

By mid-December, the US had moved more specialized military assets to Puerto Rico and the Dominican Republic that would support targeted land strikes, seizures of oil tankers or enforcement of an oil embargo. The 158th Fighter Wing of the Vermont Air National Guard deployed to Puerto Rico in December with F-35As. After a week in which more personnel and assets were deployed to the region, including special operations units "trained to support high-risk infiltration and extraction missions", on 22 December, referring to the military buildup, Trump stated: "Soon we will be starting the same program on land."

In late December, the first land strike in Venezuela was on a port facility that the US alleged was used by drug traffickers.

On 3 January 2026, explosions and low-flying aircraft were reported in Caracas and other locations and Maduro was captured in Operation Absolute Resolve by the US.

== Blockade ==
A video of the 10 December seizure of Skipper published by United States attorney general Pam Bondi on X

In December 2025, the US began blockading Venezuelan waters and directly targeting Venezuelan oil tankers. Special forces launched from USS Gerald R. Ford seized a tanker off the coast of Venezuela on 10 December 2025. The US planned additional seizures of vessels transporting Venezuelan crude, imposed additional sanctions on Maduro's family and Venezuelan oil shipments, Trump demanded the return of nationalized oil and land resources he said were seized from US corporations by the Chávez government in 2007, and announced the US would designate the "Maduro regime" a Foreign Terrorist Organization.

== Strikes on Venezuelan targets and capture of Maduro ==
On 3 January, the Federal Aviation Authority banned US commercial flights from flying over Venezuela, citing "ongoing military activity" as explosions hit Caracas at around 2 AM. Venezuela's government confirmed attacks in Caracas, as well as in Miranda, La Guaira and Aragua. Eyewitnesses reported strikes on airports and military airfields and bases. The following day, the United States announced that it had captured Maduro during a raid on Caracas. Trump said that the United States would "run" Venezuela pending a transition of power.

== Draw Down and Redeployment ==
On 12 February 2026, it was announced that the USS Gerald R. Ford Carrier Strike Group 12 would be redeployed to support the USS Abraham Lincoln (CVN-72) Carrier Strike Group 3 in the 2026 United States military buildup in the Middle East.

However while the U.S. was drawing down its forces in the area, the operation continued, as the U.S. conducted a strike on an alleged drug traffickers vessel in the Caribbean the next day on 13 February killing 3.

== Cuban crisis and further buildup ==
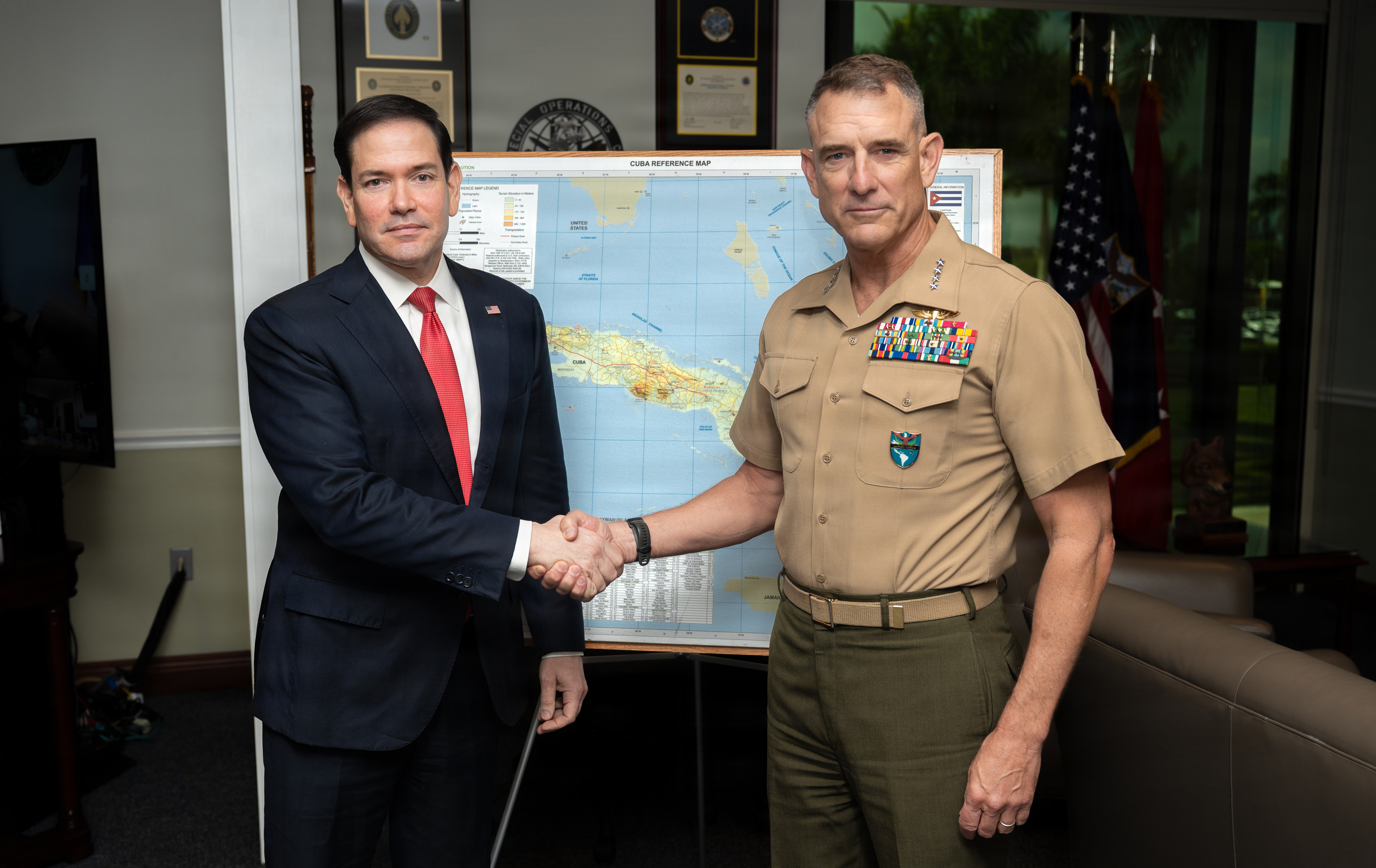
Marco Rubio and General Francis L. Donovan during the Chiefs of Mission Conference 2026

On May 5, 2026, Rubio held a meeting with SOUTHCOM commander General Francis L. Donovan regarding Operation Southern Spear with a map of Cuba on the background. When asked about why he posed a picture with the map of Cuba, he had clarified saying "Cuba is under the Southern Command, you know it's the closest part. Our ambassadors were all over the Western Hemisphere. I met with the general who just took command of SOUTHCOM, and there was a map of Cuba behind us. I thought it would be fitting to take a picture in front of it because it's the closest to the United States within SOUTHCOM.".

On May 20, 2026, USS Nimitz (CVN-68) and her Carrier Strike Group along with USS Gridley (DDG-101) and USNS Patuxent had arrived in the Caribbean.

== Casualties ==
=== United States ===
On 7 February 2026, Lance Cpl. Chukwuemeka E. Oforah, a US Marine, died in a non-combat incident after falling overboard from the amphibious assault ship USS Iwo Jima (LHD-7) while operating in the Caribbean Sea. Search and rescue efforts were unsuccessful. This is the only reported US military fatality during Operation Southern Spear.

=== Alleged drug traffickers ===
US forces reported killing approximately 144 individuals identified as narco-terrorists in airstrikes on suspected trafficking vessels during the Venezuelan authorities and human rights organizations disputed the US characterization, alleging many victims were civilians or fishermen.

Casualties among Venezuelan military personnel and allies from related ground operations are covered in 2026 United States intervention in Venezuela.

== Reactions ==
=== Venezuela ===
On 18 August 2025, Maduro said the US "has gone mad and has renewed its threats to Venezuela's peace and tranquility" and "announced the planned deployment of more than 4.5 million militia members" around Venezuela. The Economist was skeptical of the announcement, stating, "Election receipts show he received fewer than 3.8m votes last year; it is improbable that more people would fight to defend him than would vote for him." The International Institute for Strategic Studies estimated the militia had 343,000 members as of 2020. The BBC reported that many of the recently mobilized militia are "mostly made up of volunteers from poor communities, although public sector workers have reported being pressured into joining them as well." On 25 August, Maduro "said 15,000 'well armed and trained' men had been deployed to states near the Colombian border," per The Economist.

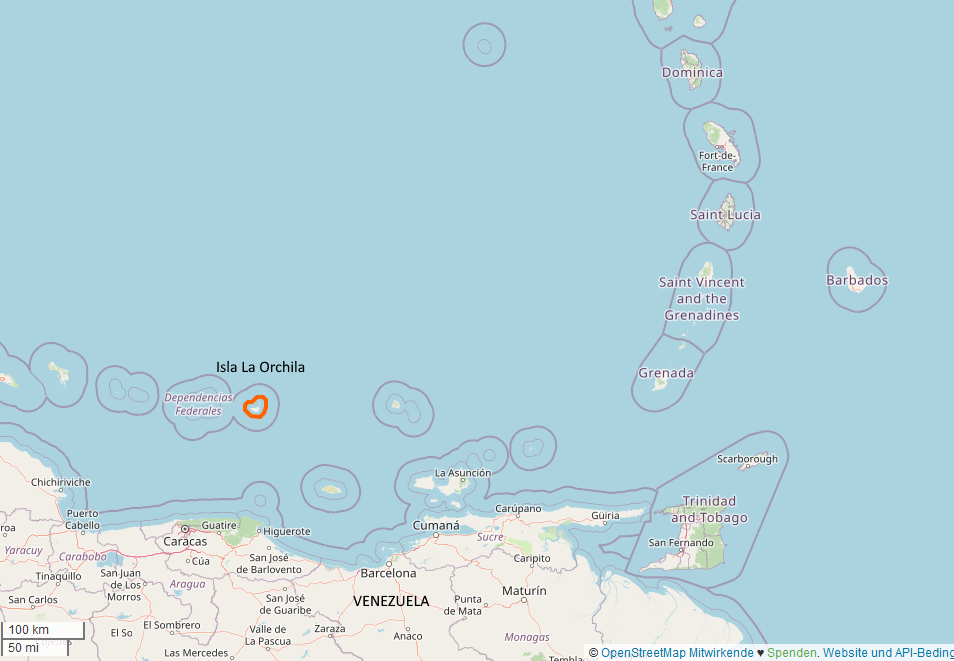
A map of the Southern Caribbean around the Venezuelan coast, showing La Orchila Island

Following the first September airstrike, Maduro said that the US was "coming for Venezuela's riches". Maduro stated that "Venezuela is confronting the biggest threat that has been seen on our continent in the last 100 years." In a display of its military strength, Venezuela initiated large-scale military exercises in the Caribbean on 17 September. The maneuvers, involving naval and air forces, were intended to bolster the nation's defense capabilities and demonstrate its readiness to protect its sovereign waters. Padrino López announced Operation Sovereign Caribbean 200 (Caribe Soberano 200) would take place on La Orchila Island aiming "to strengthen defensive capabilities and protect national sovereignty" in direct response to "the threatening and vulgar deployment of U.S. ships in the Caribbean". Following another airstrike, on 15 October 2025, Maduro declared new military exercises in Caracas shantytowns and nearby states. On 22 October, Maduro warned the US that the National Bolivarian Armed Forces had more than 5,000 Russian-made Igla-S man-portable surface-to-air-missile systems in "... key anti-aircraft defense positions to guarantee peace, stability, and tranquility". Padrino Lopez responded to the expansion after the seizure of Skipper, saying on 12 December: "We've been watching ... don't be mistaken. We're ready to defend this country. You're not going to intimidate us."

According to Reuters, the Venezuelan military is considering two strategies in preparation for a US attack. The first strategy, referred to as "prolonged resistance" on state television, would involve several small military units carrying out sabotage and other guerrilla-style tactics, according to sources. The second strategy that was not officially mentioned, "anarchization", aims to "make Venezuela ungovernable for foreign forces" by creating disorder in the capital, Caracas. The approach, labeled an acknowledgement of Venezuela's "debilitated" military, would be unlikely to succeed, as noted by sources.

After USS Gravely arrived in Trinidad and Tobago on 26 October, Venezuela condemned that country's joint drills with the US, referring to them as a "military provocation", and withdrew from an energy agreement it had established with the island nation in 2015. Vice President Delcy Rodríguez claimed without evidence that Venezuela had captured a group of mercenaries "with direct information of the American intelligence agency" whose goal was to carry out a false flag attack in the region. Minister of the Interior Diosdado Cabello said on 27 October the captured cell was four members "financed by the CIA" who had plans to blame Venezuela for an attack on the Gravely. No specifics on the captured were given; Agence France-Presse stated that "Venezuela regularly claims to have arrested US-backed mercenaries working to destabilize Maduro's administration."

Government officials announced in late October that surveillance cameras would be deployed at a large scale, and VenApp, an application used during the 2024 Venezuelan political crisis to enable citizens to report on each other's activities, would be reactivated to allow reporting to authorities of "everything they see and everything they hear, 24 hours a day".

Venezuelan opposition leader María Corina Machado said the deployment encouraged "tens and tens of thousands" of Venezuelans to join an underground movement aiming to overthrow Maduro. Machado said that the 2024 Venezuelan presidential election gave a mandate for regime change, though she said that regime change was the responsibility of Venezuelans rather than of the US.

=== Latin America and Caribbean ===
Gustavo Petro, President of Colombia, initially suggested that any attack on Venezuela would equate to an attack on Latin America and the Caribbean, and thus Colombia's armed forces could support Venezuela; he later moderated his position. On 23 September, he addressed the UN General Assembly to call for a "criminal process" to be opened against Donald Trump for US strikes in the Caribbean.

Colombia convened an extraordinary virtual meeting of the Community of Latin American and Caribbean States in September 2025, which concluded with an expression of "deep concern" over foreign intervention in the region. Over Guatemala's objection that procedures were not followed, the group issued a statement saying the region must remain a "Zone of Peace" based on "... the prohibition of the threat or use of force, the peaceful settlement of disputes, the promotion of dialogue and multilateralism, unrestricted respect for sovereignty and territorial integrity, non-interference in the internal affairs of States, and the inalienable right of peoples to self-determination." Guatemala's president Bernardo Arévalo said Guatemala was included in the list of 21 countries (of the 33 members) approving the text, although it did not sign, nor did Ecuador, Peru, Costa Rica, and El Salvador.

In August, when the initial three ships were deployed, Prime Minister of Trinidad and Tobago Kamla Persad-Bissessar offered the US military access to her nation for the US to protect Guyana amid the Guyana–Venezuela crisis. Maduro responded that Bisessar's offer was tantamount to declaring war on Venezuela, and threatened both countries with retaliation if Trinidad went through with its offer. Bisessar later praised the deployment and the 2 September strike, saying "the US military should kill [all drug traffickers] violently".

Foreign Minister of Barbados Kerrie Symmonds said that the foreign ministers of CARICOM wrote to US Secretary of State Marco Rubio asking that military operations in the Caribbean not be conducted without prior notice or explanation.

The deployment was endorsed by the government of Guyana, two-thirds of its territory being claimed by Venezuela, with Guyana's vice president and former president Bharrat Jagdeo telling The Financial Times "You cannot trust Maduro." According to Havana Times, the deployment "reignited tensions and divided positions in the region", with "the Cuba–Venezuela–Nicaragua axis" calling it an "imperialist offensive", and other countries "harden[ing] their stance against Maduro and the Cartel of the Soles."

The Commander of the Cayman Islands Coast Guard, Robert Scotland, stated that the US strikes would "send a very clear message to those entities who have been designated as narco-terrorists, and should serve as a strong deterrent to anyone who seeks to engage in the illicit trafficking of drugs and firearms within our region". The Office of the Cayman Island's Governor stated that the British government "recognizes the importance of regional security and is committed to providing advice and capacity building to our Cayman law-enforcement partners", highlighted the mutual defense alliance between the British and American governments, and emphasized organized crime as a common threat.

The United States maintains two Forward Operating Locations (FOL) on the Dutch territories of Aruba and Curaçao, stemming from a 2000 treaty. In response to escalating tensions between Venezuela and the US, the Dutch have taken a neutral position, but say treaties must be honored. Dutch Defense Minister Ruben Brekelmans stated that the treaty "permits flights from Curaçao solely for surveillance, monitoring, and the detection of drug shipments. This consent applies only to unarmed flights". According to the Curacao Chronicle, the minister indicated that the approximate 1,000 soldiers in the Dutch Antilles, as well as the Dutch Caribbean Coast Guard and accompanying aircraft, could be used "if the situation escalates". On 19 September, Prime Minister Gilmar Pisas of Curaçao stated it would renew its treaty for the Curaçao-based FOL until at least 2 November 2026.

The US expressed interest in establishing a temporary military radar base in Grenada in October. Critics urged Prime Minister Dickon Mitchell to deny the request, as they feared that the US strikes were a pretext for war with Venezuela, a nation that they say "has not done ... anything" to Grenada. The following week Admiral Alvin Holsey was denied a similar request to Antigua and Barbuda. The Grenadian government—working with CARICOM—later stated that a decision would be deferred, and in November Mitchell said that there was a non-disclosed deadline for approval of the radar station.

In December 2025, Argentina asked the International Criminal Court (ICC) to activate an arrest warrant against Maduro, to which the Venezuelan government responded by accusing Argentina of "presenting itself as a false human rights defender", citing Argentina's support of Israel at the ICC. Chilean President-elect José Antonio Kast said during a visit to Argentina and meeting with Milei that he "supports any situation that ends a dictatorship" and that an intervention in Venezuela "would solve a gigantic problem for us and all of Latin America, for all of South America".

=== Other ===
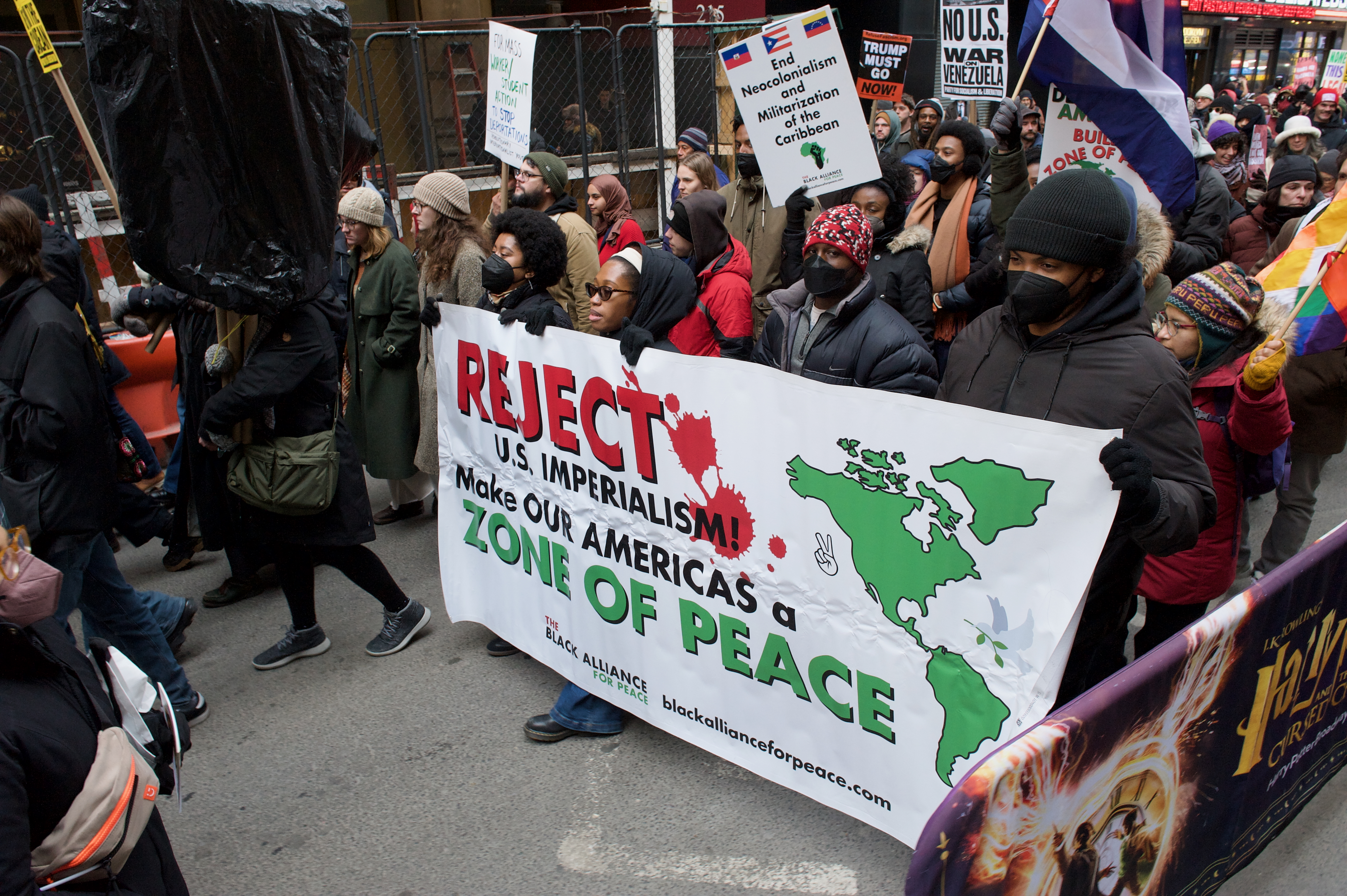
Protest in New York City featuring banners opposing US "militarization of the Caribbean", 3 January 2026

According to Pino Arlacchi, the former head of the UN Office on Drugs and Crime, the portrayal of Venezuela as a "drug state" is a "geopolitically motivated smear campaign" by the US government; he refers to the World Drug Report 2025 and his own experience, according to which the Venezuelan government's cooperation in the fight against drug trafficking is among the best in South America. According to Arlacchi, the US has taken an interest in Venezuelan oil reserves, which are among the largest in the world.

The International Federation for Human Rights (FIDH) in the Americas demands an immediate cessation of aggression against Venezuela. The U.S. government's instrumentalisation of the "fight against drugs" conveys a disproportionate use of force and sets a dangerous precedent.

Russia and China reiterated their condemnation of US actions against Venezuela at an emergency UN Security Council meeting on 23 December. Russia's Foreign Ministry called the deployment "excessive military force" and spokesperson Maria Zakharova stated that Russia "confirms our firm support for the Venezuelan leadership in defending its national sovereignty". On 19 November 2025, Chinese foreign ministry spokesperson Mao Ning said that China opposes "any interference in Venezuela's internal affairs under any pretext" and called on the United States to "choose a course of action conducive to peace and stability". On 25 November, while sending a congratulatory message to President Maduro, CCP General Secretary Xi Jinping stated that China supports Venezuela in "safeguarding its sovereignty and national security, the dignity of the nation, and social stability" and "resolutely opposes the meddling of external forces in Venezuela's internal affairs under any pretext".

Iran said that US military action in the Caribbean was provocative, destabilizing, and a threat to regional and global peace. Several Iranian officials, including Foreign Ministry spokesman Esmaeil Baghaei, stated that US military actions such as attacks on Venezuelan ships violated the United Nations Charter and international law. Iran has also turned to the UN Security Council and the UN Secretary-General to act quickly.

== Analysis ==
The Miami Herald reported on 2 October 2025 that sources said the US effort had "effectively shut down" the busy "Caribbean route" for estimated 2024 annual shipments of between 350 and 500 tons of cocaine coming from Venezuela. According to the Miami Herald, the campaign's "goal is financial: cutting off the drug revenue that sustains loyalty among Venezuela's senior military and police commanders, many of whom are accused of profiting directly from narcotrafficking." Trafficking through older air and land routes from Colombia are more costly than maritime shipments, and sources said that Venezuelan "cash flow from trafficking is under direct threat, and that puts the cohesion of the military elite at risk", with "authorities [turning] to heavier taxation and extortion of businesses to keep the state's security apparatus afloat."

According to The Economist, "Few ... think drugs are the sole or even the main focus" of the operation, noting that fentanyl, the drug that causes the most deaths in the US, is almost entirely "synthesized in Mexico and trafficked north over land" and that "the hardware"—e.g. destroyers—"doesn't match the task" of drug policing. According to The Economist, "All this makes the most sense if the principal intent is to rattle Mr Maduro, give succour to Venezuela's opposition or even stir an uprising within the Venezuelan armed forces—encouraged perhaps by that recently doubled reward." Experts speaking to Reuters and the BBC described the deployment as gunboat diplomacy and Trump administration sources stated a likely goal was to pressure the Maduro administration.

James G. Stavridis, a former US Navy admiral, characterized the strike and other US military activity around the same time as gunboat diplomacy intended to demonstrate the vulnerability of Venezuelan oil rigs and materiel. He wrote that drug interdiction was likely not the sole reason for the increased US military activity. The New York Times reported that a group of officials, led by US National Security Advisor and Secretary of State Marco Rubio, was pushing for a military campaign that would drive Maduro from power. Members of Venezuela's opposition told the New York Times they have coordinated with the Trump administration on a plan for the first hundred hours after Maduro's deposition.

PBS News reported that Trump was using the military to counter cartels he blamed for trafficking fentanyl and other illicit drugs into the US and for fuelling violence in American cities, stating that the government had "not signaled any planned land incursion"—similarly, The Guardian stated that "many experts are skeptical the US is planning a military intervention" in Venezuela.

The Financial Times wrote that the strikes were intended to pressure members of the Venezuelan government into resigning or arranging a handover of power by demonstrating the US military's capability to capture or kill them through targeted strikes.

According to The New York Times, "specialists in the laws of war and executive power" stated that Trump had "used the military in a way that had no clear legal precedent or basis".

In an interview with Vanity Fair magazine, Susie Wiles, Trump's White House Chief of Staff, told journalist Chris Whipple that Trump would "keep on blowing boats up until Maduro cries uncle." Whipple himself believed the terminology spoke to the possibility of Trump wanting to see regime change, and Wiles described the Vanity Fair article as "a hit piece".

== See also ==
- 2026 United States military buildup in the Middle East
- Air Bridge Denial Program – American program against drug trafficking
- Axis of Unity - The Venezuela–Iran strategic alliance
- Capture of Nicolás Maduro - Maduro captured by the United States Forces
- Chinese shadow fleet - Ghost fleet used to avoid sanctions
- Iranian shadow fleet - fleet used to avoid sanctions on Iran and Venezuela
- Joint Interagency Task Force South – Unified military command and control of drug interdiction activities
- Legalist Revolution – 1892 naval blockade by Great Britain, France, Germany, Spain and USA
- Venezuela–Iran ghost flights - Clandestine and irregular flight routes transporting weapons, drugs, personnel etc.
- Venezuelan crisis of 1902–1903 – naval blockade by Great Britain, Germany, Netherlands and Italy
- Venezuelan shadow fleet
