= United States strikes on alleged drug traffickers during Operation Southern Spear =

Caribbean Sea and Pacific Ocean airstrikes

- Part of Operation Southern Spear, the US military buildup in the Caribbean, the war on terror and the war on cartels
- Type: Airstrikes
- Locations: Caribbean Sea; Pacific Ocean; Venezuela; Ecuador (disputed)
- Planned by: United States
- Target: Vessels crewed by and outposts of alleged drug traffickers
- Date: 1 September 2025 – present (1 year, 2 months, 2 weeks and 1 day)
- Executed by: United States; United States Armed Forces; United States Navy; United States Air Force; United States Marine Corps; United States Coast Guard; Central Intelligence Agency
- Casualties: 243 people killed in boat strikes (includes 17 missing and presumed dead), several captured, and 2 extradited At least 1 killed in land strikes in Venezuela

The United States military began executing airstrikes on vessels in the Caribbean Sea in September 2025, described by the administration of President Donald Trump as part of an effort to fight the flow of illicit drugs from Latin America to the US. In October, the strikes expanded to include vessels in the Eastern Pacific Ocean. The Trump administration has alleged, without producing public evidence, that the vessels were operated by groups it designated as narcoterrorists, including the Venezuelan organization Tren de Aragua and the Colombian far-left guerilla group National Liberation Army.

As part of what was later unveiled as Operation Southern Spear, the US began deploying Navy warships and personnel to the Caribbean in mid-August. Trump announced on 2 September that the US Navy had carried out the first airstrike in the Caribbean on a boat from Venezuela, killing all 11 people aboard; he released a video of the incident, which Venezuelan sources said had occurred on 1 September. US officials said that this was a military operation against drug cartels in Latin America and that these military operations would continue. As of 27 October 2026, at least 243 people had been killed (including 17 who are missing and presumed dead) in at least 80 strikes on over 81 vessels and the US had made its first strike on a land target within Venezuela. On 12 June, Niño Guerrero, leader of Tren de Aragua, was killed in joint operation with the post-Maduro Venezuelan government. In addition, on 6 March 2026, as part of the Ecuador conflict, the United States and Ecuadorian Armed Forces airstriked a single target allegedly belonging to FARC dissidents.

The strikes came amid tensions between the United States and Venezuela as Trump steadily increased pressure. Venezuela's Nicolás Maduro repeatedly accused the US of seeking regime change which some third-party sources agree with. Some experts, human rights groups and international bodies have said the killings are illegal under US and international law, and the Colombian and Venezuelan governments have accused the US of extrajudicial murder. In 2025 the Republican-controlled US Senate twice rejected resolutions that would limit Trump's authority to continue military action against Venezuela or airstrikes against alleged drug vessels. On 3 January 2026, Maduro was captured and flown out of the country by US forces.

== Background ==
During the Trump administration's second term, the US intensified its focus on drug cartels, characterizing the smugglers as terrorists. In August 2025, the US deployed warships and personnel to the Caribbean, citing the need to combat drug cartels. PBS News reported that Trump was using the military to counter cartels he blamed for trafficking fentanyl and other illicit drugs into the US and for fueling violence in American cities.

== Airstrikes on vessels ==
Unclassified footage of the first airstrike (1 September)

As of 19 September 2026, at least 234 people had been killed (including 17 who are missing and presumed dead) in 78 strikes on 79 vessels, including 15 vessels struck in the Caribbean Sea, 31 in the Eastern Pacific, and 2 in an unspecified location.

In four of the strikes as of 31 December 2025, crew members survived the initial strike. The number of people killed includes two survivors from the initial strike who were killed in subsequent strikes and one missing survivor of the 27 October strike who is presumed dead. Two people who survived the 16 October strike were repatriated to their home countries. The US Coast Guard suspended a search for an unknown number of survivors of the 30 December strike.

The Department of Defense has not often provided information about what drug cartels have been involved in the vessels targeted for airstrikes, or publicly identified the alleged drug traffickers.

=== Initial strike ===
Approximate path and location of 1 September airstrike announced on 2 September, showing the vessel's start from San Juan de Unare, Sucre, Venezuela, and projected end at Chaguaramas, Trinidad and Tobago

The US announced on 2 September that a naval vessel struck and sank a speedboat that it alleged was smuggling drugs from Venezuela to the southern Caribbean. El Pitazo and Venezuela's El Nacional stated that the boat was destroyed on Monday, 1 September. Trump said the attack destroyed a significant quantity of illegal narcotics bound for the United States, and killed 11 members of Tren de Aragua. On 6 September 2025, Marco Rubio, the US Secretary of State, said: "Instead of interdicting it, on the president's orders, we blew it up. And it'll happen again." According to The Wall Street Journal, "The attack was the US military's first publicly acknowledged airstrike in Central or South America since the US invasion of Panama in 1989."

The vessel was a flipper type with four 200-horsepower engines about 12 metres (39 ft) long; it came from San Juan de Unare, located on the Paria Peninsula in Sucre state. El Pitazo reported that it was headed for nearby Trinidad and Tobago. Two other vessels which departed at about the same time escaped detection. Sources told journalist Sebastiana Barráez that the vessel carried a "considerable cargo" some of which was thrown overboard before the US attack. (Note: See Carlos Salazar X post with video of journalist Sebastiana Barraez, who states at timestamp 1:50 that the boat passengers communicated via satellite telephones.)

Originally a fishing village, San Juan de Unare had been taken over as a logistics hub for international drug and human trafficking since 2018. Tren de Aragua used the Sucre coast for transporting drugs ultimately destined for the US via Caribbean islands. An anonymous expert on organized crime told Efecto Cocuyo that drugs trafficked through the region originate in Colombia, and that gangs such as Tren de Aragua are "attempting to control these territories to establish direct transportation routes to the islands of the Eastern Caribbean". A 1 October Insight Crime report stated that the Venezuelan state has significant influence over Sucre's illicit trafficking operations.

Trump posted footage of the attack on Truth Social, showing a missile striking the boat and setting it on fire. Rubio added that the boat appeared to be heading for Trinidad or another Caribbean country.

==== Survivors and follow-up strike ====
The New York Times and Associated Press reported that national security sources acknowledged that the boat seemed to be turning back when it was hit.

In November 2025, The Washington Post reported that two anonymous sources said Pete Hegseth, the US Secretary of Defense, had given a verbal order to SEAL Team Six to leave no survivors; two people who survived the initial strike were killed in a subsequent double tap strike. Sean Parnell, a public affairs spokesperson for the Pentagon, stated: "This entire narrative is completely false." Hegseth responded on social media that "the fake news is delivering more fabricated, inflammatory, and derogatory reporting to discredit our incredible warriors fighting to protect the homeland". CNN stated that "Hegseth had ordered the military prior to the operation to ensure the strike killed every person on board, but it's not clear if he knew there were survivors prior to the second strike, one of the sources said." Five US officials speaking anonymously to The New York Times outlined the same chronology of the attack unfolding: they said Hegseth ordered a lethal strike ahead of the actual attack, but did not give orders about what to do if the lethal strike failed, and did not give the order after seeing footage showing survivors. US Navy Admiral Frank M. "Mitch" Bradley, the commander who directed the strike, stated in closed briefings to US legislators on 4 December that there was no order to "kill them all" or "grant no quarter". According to anonymous sources reported by CNN, Bradley said the struck vessel was going to meet another boat which was bound for Suriname. Five people familiar with Bradley's briefing, including one lawmaker who viewed video of the incident, believed the survivors were signaling for help, rescue, or surrender at the time they were killed. In the classified briefing, Bradley admitted that people killed in the boat may have been the victims of human trafficking.

In 1 December press conference the White House reiterated "the president has made it quite clear that if narcoterrorists are trafficking illegal drugs towards the United States, he has the authority to kill them". Karoline Leavitt, press secretary for the Trump administration, stated that "... Secretary Hegseth authorized Admiral Bradley to conduct these kinetic strikes. Admiral Bradley worked well within his authority and the law, directing the engagement to ensure the boat was destroyed and the threat to the United States of America was eliminated." According to The Guardian, the administration "argu[es] that its objective was to ensure the complete destruction of the boat". Bradley was promoted after the strike.

The Washington Post also reported that intelligence analysts observing the boat via surveillance aircraft were increasingly confident that it was carrying drugs, and that "protocols were changed after the strike", providing for rescue of survivors, according to anonymous sources.

=== Subsequent strikes associated with Venezuela ===
On 15 September, the US struck a boat allegedly transporting drugs from Venezuela during the morning hours, killing three people aboard the vessel. Following the attack, Trump wrote on social media in all capital letters: "Be warned—If you are transporting drugs that can kill Americans, we are hunting you!" Anonymous sources for The Guardian said leadership for the strike was provided by Stephen Miller, newly empowered via the Homeland Security Council. White House officials learned about the strike hours before it happened.

Trump told reporters on 16 September that the US military had sunk a third boat in the Caribbean, without providing any other detail. (Note: Sources published on 3 October would refer to the 3 October strike as the fifth vessel sunk, accounting for a 16 September strike. Later sources, for example 17 October Reuters, did not count the 16 September announcement.) Weeks later, Colombian President Gustavo Petro stated that one of the strikes may have killed a Colombian, (Note: Petro referred to la última lancha bombardeada (the last bombed boat), which some sources reported as the 3 October strike.) and two unnamed US officials stated that there were Colombians on at least one of the boats. The White House responded that these assertions were baseless. On 18 October, Petro specified that he was referring to the 16 September strike announced by Trump; other sources said Petro was referring to the 15 September strike.

On 3 October, a strike on a vessel near the coast of Venezuela killed four people. (Note: The strike was described as the fourth or fifth vessel struck, if counting the 16 September announcement by Trump.) Hegseth wrote that the vessel was transporting substantial amounts of narcotics and at the time was heading towards the United States, adding that the vessel was operating on a known narco-trafficking transit route.

On 14 October, six more people were killed in a strike on a vessel near the coast of Venezuela. Trump stated that Hegseth ordered the strike that morning. Two of those killed may have been citizens of Trinidad and Tobago.

On 24 October, Hegseth announced "the first strike at night" against a vessel allegedly operated by Tren de Aragua in the Caribbean, killing six people on board.

=== Other Caribbean strikes ===
An infographic which shows the approximate locations of American airstrikes

On 19 September, Trump announced that another vessel allegedly carrying drugs had been destroyed in the Caribbean and that three people had been killed; Trump stated that the vessel was "affiliated with a Designated Terrorist Organization conducting narcotrafficking in the USSOUTHCOM area of responsibility", but did not specify where within the United States Southern Command the strike occurred, the country of origin, or the alleged criminal affiliation. The Dominican Republic later announced that, under its National Directorate for Drug Control and the Dominican Navy, it had cooperated with the US Navy to locate the boat, which was about 80 nautical miles (130 km) south of Dominican-controlled Beata Island. After the boat was destroyed the Dominican Navy salvaged 377 packages of cocaine amounting to 1,000 kilograms (2,200 lb). The Directorate stated that "This is the first time in history that the United States and the Dominican Republic carry out a joint operation against narco terrorism in the Caribbean".

Reuters reported that there was a previously unannounced strike on 16 October 2025, which included survivors. The US alleged that the vessel struck was a narco-submarine. Two people were killed and two survived. The survivors were rescued and detained on a US Navy ship. By 19 October, both were repatriated to their respective countries of origin, Colombia and Ecuador.

On 17 October, a strike in international waters on an alleged Colombian National Liberation Army (ELN) drug vessel killed an additional three people. The ELN denied involvement with the alleged drug boat or any other drug boat trafficking.

On 1 November, a strike "at the direction of President Trump" according to Hegseth, killing three people took place on what the US claimed was a designated terrorist organization, though the organization's name was not given.

Hours after the US Senate voted down a resolution that would have required congressional approval for further strikes, a 6 November strike in the Caribbean killed three people, with debris and body parts reportedly washing ashore in Colombia days later.

A strike on 10 November in the Caribbean killed four people. A 13 February strike killed three people. Three strikes were conducted on 16 February, one of which killed three people in the Caribbean. A 23 February strike killed three people.A 25 March strike killed four people.

=== Pacific strikes ===
The US struck another alleged drug boat on 21 October, killing at least two people, marking the first strike to take place in the Pacific Ocean. An unnamed US official said the strike occurred off the Colombian coast. A second strike in the Pacific on 22 October killed three people.

Three more strikes on four alleged drug boats in the Pacific—the first instance of multiple boats struck in one day—killed 14 people on 27 October. There was one survivor, seen clinging to debris after the strike. The Mexican Navy (SEMAR) coordinated search and rescue after the US reported the location to aircraft in the area from Mexico, and the US Coast Guard. On 31 October, Mexican officials said that after its mandatory, typical 96-hour search had yielded no survivor, it would stop searching.

On 29 October, a strike on an alleged drug boat in the eastern Pacific Ocean killed four people, followed by a 4 November strike that killed two people. Two boats were struck on 9 November, each killing three people.

In the first strike after the unveiling of Operation Southern Spear, the US Southern Command announced in a post to X that the Southern Spear joint task force had conducted a 15 November strike that killed three people; a strike on 4 December killed four people, and three strikes on three vessels that killed eight people were announced on 15 December. A strike on 17 December killed four people, two strikes on two vessels on 18 December killed five people, a 22 December strike killed one person, and a 29 December strike killed two people.

Three vessels traveling in a convoy were struck on 30 December, killing three people. After the first vessel was hit, an unknown number of survivors jumped overboard from the other two vessels before they were sunk. Unnamed sources reported at least six, and possibly eight survivors. On 2 January 2026, US Coast Guard suspended a search for survivors southwest of the Mexican–Guatemalan border, in the fourth strike where crew members survived the initial strike.

A 23 January strike killed two people and left one survivor, for whom the US Coast Guard activated a search-and-rescue mission. A 5 February strike on an alleged Designated Terrorist Organization killed two people. A US military strike on 9 February killed two people and left one survivor for whom the Maritime Rescue Coordination Center Ecuador launched a search-and-rescue mission with technical assistance from the US Coast Guard. On 16 February, the US struck two boats in the Pacific, killing four people per boat. A 20 February strike killed three people. An 8 March strike killed six. A 19 March strike killed two and left one survivor who was captured. A 18 June strike killed three.

=== Summary of strikes on vessels ===
Strikes by the United States military
No.	Date	Location	Vessels struck	People killed	People captured	Missing / Presumed dead	Source and notes
1	1–2 September 2025	Caribbean – Venezuela	1	11			Most sources list as 2 September, the day Trump announced the strike; Venezuelan sources state the vessel was struck the day before it was announced. Three months later, subsequent strikes that killed two survivors were revealed.
2	15 September 2025	Caribbean – Venezuela	1	3			Gustavo Petro alleges one casualty was a Colombian fisherman
3	19 September 2025	Caribbean	1	3			Dominican Republic recovers cocaine
4	3 October 2025	Caribbean – Venezuela	1	4			First strike after notification of "armed conflict"
5	14 October 2025	Caribbean – Venezuela	1	6			Family says one missing was from Trinidad and Tobago
6	16 October 2025	Caribbean	1	2	2		Two survivors repatriated to Colombia and Ecuador. The vessel that was struck was a Narco-submarine.
7	17 October 2025	Caribbean	1	3			Allegedly affiliated with Colombian ELN
8	21 October 2025	Pacific	1	2			First strike in Eastern Pacific, allegedly off Colombian coast
9	22 October 2025	Pacific	1	3			
10	24 October 2025	Caribbean – Venezuela	1	6			
11–13	27 October 2025	Pacific	4	14		1	Three strikes on four vessels leave one survivor, presumed dead
14	29 October 2025	Pacific	1	4			
15	1 November 2025	Caribbean	1	3			
16	4 November 2025	Pacific	1	2			
17	6 November 2025	Caribbean	1	3			
18–19	9 November 2025	Pacific	2	6			Two vessels, three killed on each
20	10 November 2025	Caribbean	1	4			
21	15 November 2025	Pacific	1	3			First strike after formal unveiling of Operation Southern Spear
22	4 December 2025	Pacific	1	4			
23–25	15 December 2025	Pacific	3	8			
26	17 December 2025	Pacific	1	4			
27–28	18 December 2025	Pacific	2	5			
29	22 December 2025	Pacific	1	1			
30	29 December 2025	Pacific	1	2			
31–33	30 December 2025	Pacific	3	11			The first strike killed three people. Eight survivors from the first strike were killed on subsequent strikes on two other vessels.
34–35	31 December 2025	Pacific	2	5			
36	23 January 2026	Pacific	1	2		1	First strike on vessel post capture of Maduro.
37	5 February 2026	Pacific	1	2			
38	9 February 2026	Pacific	1	2		1	
39	13 February 2026	Caribbean	1	3			First strike in the Caribbean in three months.
40–42	16 February 2026	Pacific and Caribbean	3	11			2 vessels struck in the Pacific and 1 in the Caribbean
43	20 February 2026	Pacific	1	3			
44	23 February 2026	Caribbean	1	3			
45	8 March 2026	Pacific	1	6			
46	19 March 2026	Pacific	1	2	1		Original post on X by SOUTHCOM claimed there were 3 survivors. Costa Rican authorities recovered 1 survivor and 2 bodies.
47	25 March 2026	Caribbean	1	4			
48–49	11 April 2026	Pacific	2	5		1	
50	13 April 2026	Pacific	1	2			
51	14 April 2026	Pacific	1	4			
52	15 April 2026	Pacific	1	3			
53	19 April 2026	Caribbean	1	3			
54	24 April 2026	Pacific	1	2			
55	26 April 2026	Pacific	1	3			
56	4 May 2026	Caribbean	1	2			
57	5 May 2026	Pacific	1	3			
58	8 May 2026	Pacific	1	2		1	
59	26 May 2026	Pacific	1	1		2	
60	27 May 2026	Pacific	1	2			
61	29 May 2026	Pacific	1	3			
62	30 May 2026	Pacific	1	3			
63	3 June 2026	Pacific	1	2			
64	16 June 2026	Pacific	1	1		2	
65	18 June 2026	Pacific	1	3			
66	21 June 2026	Caribbean	1	2		6	
67	23 August 2026	Pacific	1	2			
68	25 August 2026	Caribbean	1	4			
69	28 August 2026	Pacific	1		>1		The first of several joint U.S. Marine and Navy operation boarded a refueling vessel. All individuals were captured and the vessel itself was blown up in a strike while no one was onboard.
70	2 September 2026	Pacific	1		>1		Interdiction, and destruction of vessel
71	3 September 2026	Pacific	1				Interdiction, and destruction of vessel
72	5 September 2026	Pacific	>1		>1		Interdiction, and destruction of several vessels
73	7 September 2026	Pacific	1		>1		Interdiction, and destruction of vessel
74	8 September 2026	Pacific	1		>1		Interdiction, and destruction of vessel
75	9 September 2026	Caribbean	1	3			
76	15 September 2026	Pacific	1		>1		Interdiction, and destruction of vessel
77	16 September 2026	Pacific	1		>1		Interdiction, and destruction of vessel
78	19 September 2026	Caribbean	1	4			
79	4 October 2026	Caribbean	1	4			
80	27 October 2026	Pacific	1	5			

== Armed conflict declaration and escalation ==
Trump formally notified the United States Congress on 1 October 2025 that the US was in a "non-international armed conflict" with "unlawful combatants" regarding drug cartels in the Caribbean, specifically referencing the 15 September strike. The Miami Herald wrote that: "In an armed conflict, a country can lawfully kill enemy fighters even when they pose no threat."

Initially positioned as a mission to stop narcotics traffic to the US, by mid-October, Venezuelan opposition figures and independent analysts stated the American objective had shifted to regime change, with Trump acknowledging the possibility of strikes within Venezuelan territory.

On 16 October, Admiral Alvin Holsey, the commander of United States Southern Command, announced that he would retire at the end of the year, less than a year into what is normally a three-year placement, with anonymous sources reporting tension between Holsey and the Trump administration over Venezuela. Two unnamed officials told The Wall Street Journal that tension between Hegseth and Holsey began early during Trump's administration over military planning involving the Panama Canal, with Hegseth wanting to replace Holsey, but differences intensified when "Holsey was initially concerned about murky legal authority for the boat strike campaign" and "objected that parts of the operations fell outside his direct control". The sources stated that, after months of tension, there was a confrontational meeting in October, and Holsey's resignation was announced the same day.

On 13 November 2025, Hegseth formally unveiled Operation Southern Spear, led by Joint Task Force Southern Spear and using a fleet with robotics and autonomous systems to target Latin American drug trafficking. Described by a US official as "a formal operation naming for what the Joint Task Force Southern Spear ... and Southcom have already been doing in theater", the "counter-narco-terrorism campaign" included the airstrikes on vessels.

=== Colombia conflict ===
Following increased criticism by Colombian President Gustavo Petro over US strikes on vessels and support for Israel in the Gaza war during his visit to the September session of the UN General Assembly, the US Department of State revoked Petro's visa on 27 September, stating on X that: "Earlier today, Colombian president (Gustavo Petro) stood on a NYC street and urged US soldiers to disobey orders and incite violence."

Petro stated that a US airstrike had killed a Colombian fisherman whose vessel was not involved in drug trafficking, and accused the US of murder. Trump responded calling Petro an "illegal drug leader", who was "low rated" and not helping diminish production of drugs, stating that the US would end the large subsidies it provided to Colombia.

In October 2025, the United States Department of the Treasury announced sanctions against Petro and Interior Minister Armando Benedetti, citing their alleged involvement in illicit drug trafficking activities. These measures marked a significant deterioration in bilateral relations, with the Colombian government condemning the decision as politically motivated and labeling it "an act of aggression" against its sovereignty. Analysts described the move as one of the most severe diplomatic escalations between Bogotá and Washington in recent years.

== Land targets in Venezuela ==
List of strikes on land

- Ports/docks
- 0 killed – unknown location, about 24 December 2025
- Airstrips
- At least 57 people killed in
  3 January 2026 Operation Absolute Resolve
- Targeted killings
- Niño Guerrero killed in Bolívar, about 12 June 2026

— As of 12 June 2026

US officials said on 30 October 2025 they had identified "targets that sit at the nexus of the drug gangs and the Maduro regime", including facilities such as ports and airstrips, including military facilities, allegedly uses for drug trafficking. On 22 December, referring to the military buildup and ongoing airstrikes, Trump stated: "Soon we will be starting the same program on land."

Trump announced on 29 December the first strike on a land target in Venezuela, stating that a marine facility used for loading drug boats had been hit. Trump had previously mentioned on 26 December a strike he said happened two nights earlier, likely on 24 December. Trump gave no details about the location of the facility or what entity, military or otherwise, was responsible for the strike. As of 30 December, there were no official statements from either the US or Venezuela confirming the details of any strike.

CNN reported that unnamed sources said Trump was referencing a drone strike with no casualties, conducted by the CIA, with intelligence support from US military forces, on a "remote dock on the Venezuelan coast that the US government believed was being used by the Venezuelan gang Tren de Aragua to store drugs and move them onto boats for onward shipping".

Other incidents in December were speculated to be land targets mentioned by Trump. Colombia's president Petro stated that the target was a factory near Maracaibo that he suspected was used by ELN to fabricate cocaine from coca paste. Petro did not name the factory, but extensive ELN activity in Venezuela has been documented by Insight Crime, and several sources speculated that a warehouse fire at a petrochemical facility on 24 December was the target mentioned by Trump, although the company denied any connection. Eyewitnesses reported another incident on 18 December in another area of ELN activity on the northwestern Venezuelan border with Colombia in which they say a storage hut was destroyed by an explosion. The War Zone reported on 2 January that fragments of missiles found in the area were consistent with a US drone strike.

On 3 January 2026, explosions and low-flying aircraft were reported in Caracas and other locations, and Maduro was captured in Operation Absolute Resolve by the US.

On 12 June, Trump announced that the US carried out an airstrike targeting Tren de Aragua leader Niño Guerrero in a joint operation with the Venezuelan government. Venezuela confirmed the operation the following day, which it said took place in Bolívar state.

== Ecuador ==
On 3 March, 2026, United States Southern Command and the Ecuadorian Armed Forces launched joint military operations against alleged drug traffickers based in Ecuador, in an expansion of the ongoing Ecuadorian conflict. Initial reporting indicated that the US. was not directly participating in these operations, instead providing intelligence and logistical support, as well as U.S. special forces training, for Ecuadorian commandos.

On 6 March, Ecuador and the United States claimed that their militaries had conducted a joint operation, a bombing of a location in the Cascales Canton region, along the Colombia-Ecuador border. Both governments asserted the target was a compound belonging to Comandos de la Frontera, a group of FARC dissidents accused of drug smuggling. The Pentagon claimed the bombing was conducted by the US military, while Ecuador, in a Spanish language press release, stated the bombing was conducted by their forces with US intelligence.

On 24 March, a New York Times report emerged stating that the target was actually a cattle and dairy farm, which was destroyed by at least three rockets fired from a helicopter. The strike was part of a larger, week-long operation, during which Ecuadorian soldiers interrogated farmworkers, burned down their shelters with gasoline, and burned down and bombed two nearby homes.

The following day, 25 March, the Ecuadorian Defense Ministry commented on the event, indicating "The Ministry of National Defense rejects any assertion that distorts facts". The Ministry also indicated it had captured 4 of the Comandos de la Frontera, who were later released. The United States Department of Defense, did not comment as an investigation into the event is ongoing, but referred the matter to the Office of the Director of National Intelligence for further questions.

In January 2026, an Ecuadorian fishing vessel, carrying eight crew members disappeared, while two other crew member were away. When they returned to the boat's last know location, there was no sign of it and it is unknown what happened to it. In March, two Ecuadorian fishing vessels near the Galápagos Islands in Ecuador's exclusive economic zone were attacked and damaged by small, explosive-laden rotor drones. In both these incidents, the crews reported being later taken aboard a U.S. military vessel and later transferred to El Salvador and handed over to the authorities there, before being returned to Ecuador. The Washington Post reported in August that the two Galápagos boat strikes were part of a covert CIA program, although CNN said they could not independently verify this. While the US has admitted attacking dozens of alleged drug-trafficking vessels in the Caribbean and Pacific, they have denied responsibility for these incidents. Ecuadorian authorities have also largely not commented on them. In late August, the U.S., in collaboration with Ecuador, began sinking Ecuadorian vessels alleged to be involved drug traffickiing. Within two weeks, six vessels were sunk, with the crews being removed and transferred to Ecuadorian authorities before the boats were sunk. The U.S. said the boats were linked to the criminal group Los Choneros and that some had been acting as floating refueling stations.

== Casualties and survivors ==
=== Identified ===
A report by British newspaper The Guardian on 15 May 2026 identified 13 of the victims and mentioned 3 who had already been identified. The report found no evidence of involvement in drug trafficking by any of those identified. However according to the Guardian all the victims came from poor families of Latin America and the Caribbean. The Guardian added what while some of victims "may have had some involvement in drug trafficking..." others had no connection to the drug trade. Though some participants "fit the profile" of individuals turned trafficking as a survival mechanism amid economic turmoil.

The names of the identified; in order of the Guardian report:

- Juan Carlos Fuentes, from Venezuela
- Luis Ramón Amundarain, from Venezuela
- Eduard Hildalgo, from Venezuela
- Dushak Milovcic, from Venezuela
- Robert Sánchez, from Venezuela
- Jesús Carreño, from Venezuela
- Eduardo Jaime, from Venezuela
- Luis Alí Martínez, from Venezuela
- Alejandro Andrés Carranza Medina, from Colombia
- Ronald Arregocés, from Colombia
- Adrián Lino, from Colombia
- Pedro Ramón Holguín Holguín, from Ecuador
- Carlos Manuel Rodríguez Solórzano, from Ecuador
- Chad Joseph, from Trinidad and Tobago
- Rishi Samaroo, from Trinidad and Tobago
- Ricky Joseph, from Saint Lucia

=== Trump administration claims ===
The Trump administration alleges the vessels destroyed were operated by narcoterrorists or members of cartels or gangs. The Guardian stated on 6 November 2025 that "governments and families of those killed in the US strikes on alleged drug boats have said many of the dead were civilians—primarily fishers." Sean Parnell stated that Department of Defense intelligence "consistently ... confirm[ed] that the individuals involved in these drug operations were narco-terrorists, and we stand by that assessment". Names and surnames of people missing and suspected killed in the strikes have rarely been made public and information has been repressed by the Venezuelan government, or families have avoided speaking out of fear. Dozens of those killed have not been identified; as of 8 November, those identified publicly include two Colombians, one Ecuadorian, two men from Trinidad and Tobago, and nine Venezuelans.

The family of a Colombian fisherman presumably killed in the 15 September strike stated that Alejandro Andrés Carranza Medina, alias 'Coroncoro', was not trafficking drugs, but according to CBS News, "... media have reported that Carranza had a criminal record for stealing weapons in collusion with gangs". Colombia's El Tiempo reported that in 2015 he was "allegedly involved in the theft of 264 weapons from the Santa Marta Metropolitan Police"; El País stated that the alleged perpetrator "accepted the charges of conspiracy to commit a crime, embezzlement, falsification of public documents and aggravated theft". In early December 2025, Colombian president Petro's personal lawyer filed a complaint with the Inter-American Commission on Human Rights (IACHR) against Hegseth on behalf of Carranza's family.

According to CNN, the sister of the Ecuadorian survivor of the 16 October strike, repatriated to Ecuador, "claim[ed] to know nothing of her brother's alleged involvement with drug trafficking and instead portrayed him as a desperate father trying to provide for his six kids". The Ecuadorian had been convicted and deported from the US in 2020 for drug smuggling. The Ecuadorian attorney general's office stated that no crime reports had been filed against him with their institution, so absent evidence for detaining him, the subject was released. The other survivor of the 16 October strike, repatriated to Colombia, was hospitalized upon arrival with moderate injuries, including a skull fracture. Petro and Armando Benedetti, Colombian Minister of the Interior, said at the time he was repatriated the survivor would be "prosecuted according to the law, because he is allegedly a criminal who was trafficking drugs". However, because the incident occurred in international waters, outside Colombian territory, he would only be prosecuted if he voluntarily spoke and incriminated himself. He was released on 6 November with no charges.

The families of two missing people from Trinidad and Tobago identified them publicly and suspected they were killed in the 14 October strike; one family said their relative was a fisherman who traveled often to Venezuela and denied he was involved in trafficking drugs. MSNBC wrote that one had a drug-related charge from 2018, and the other had been released in 2021 after a prison sentence for a 2009 murder.

In the Paria Peninsula of Sucre state in Venezuela, from which the first boat struck on 1 September allegedly originated, Venezuelan media reported the area was known for trafficking, although not necessarily by Tren de Aragua, and some family members stated that villagers had become involved in illicit activity out of economic necessity. Inhabitants describing a town in mourning published tributes containing photos of the deceased beginning early on 3 September. The deceased included eight persons from San Juan de Unare and three from a nearby town, Güiria. The New York Times reported that "Venezuelan security officials descended on San Juan de Unare, cut off the electricity and made clear that public pronouncements about the attacks were not welcome, according to four townspeople, including the niece of one of the victims." Associated Press journalist Regina Garcia Cano visited Sucre just after the first Venezuelan strike and interviewed dozens of people; she wrote of the "sources' very real fears of being punished—particularly by the Venezuelan government—for speaking to reporters". She gained information about nine people, including the names of four of those killed, and found that some of "the dead men had indeed been running drugs but were not narco-terrorists ... or leaders of a cartel or gang". People interviewed by Garcia Cano said most of those killed were first-time crew members, and that they "included a fisherman, a motorcycle taxi driver, laborers and two low-level career criminals ... One was a well-known local crime leader who had agreed to work for narcotics smugglers." One reportedly trafficked both drugs and humans.

Two unidentified bodies suspected by locals to be casualties from the 1 September strike washed up on the shores of Trinidad and Tobago, showing signs of having been blown up. People who knew him claimed one of the bodies was a Venezuelan, recognizable by his watch; the Associated Press report said "he had been jailed by Venezuelan authorities on human-trafficking charges after a boat he had operated capsized in December 2020" and people had described him as "a longtime local crime boss [who] made most of his living smuggling drugs and people across borders".

Two days after the 6 November 2025 strike, a boat matching the one in the video of the strike washed ashore in the Guajira Peninsula of northwestern Colombia, near the Gulf of Venezuela, followed by bodies and charred debris, according to The New York Times. Two bodies that washed ashore were later buried by locals but, due to the remoteness of the area, did not come to media attention until the 29 December Times report.

=== United States ===
On 7 February, a US Marine; Lance Cpl Chukwuemeka E. Oforah, fell overboard the USS Iwo Jima. After a search-and-rescue operation was intiated with no body recovered, he was declared dead on 10 February. He is the first known American fatality from Operation Southern Spear.

== Analysis ==
=== US rationale ===
The Trump administration did not initially announce any specific legal authority for the first strike. Secretary of Defense Pete Hegseth declared, "We have the absolute and complete authority", citing "... the defense of the American people alone. 100,000 Americans were killed each year under the previous administration because of an open border and open drug traffic flow. That is an assault on the American people." Regarding the initial strike, the Trump administration did not provide evidence about the vessel's cargo, nor did it establish that the vessel's crew were threatening to attack. Trump was questioned on 5 September about the legality of the first strike, to which he responded: "We don't want drugs killing our people. I believe we lost 300,000 ... last year"—a number he repeated days later in an Oval Office meeting. Drug overdose deaths in the US in 2024 were about 80,000 according to the US Centers for Disease Control and Prevention, representing a 25 percent decline from the previous year deaths of 112,910. When speaking impromptu to reporters prior to boarding Air Force One on 14 September, Trump inflated that number to 300 million.

CNN states that "allegations involving [Venezuela's] presidential palace in cocaine trafficking have existed for at least a decade." Former US Attorney General William Barr first accused Maduro of supporting drug trafficking in 2020, stating that 250 tons of cocaine are smuggled through Venezuela annually, facilitated by the government, although no evidence was presented. On 7 August, the Trump administration doubled an existing $50 million reward for information leading to the arrest of Maduro on the 2020 Justice Department charges.

UN analysis of global drug trafficking contradicts the broader Trump administration claims around narco-trafficking through Venezuela, as it shows that the majority of drugs trafficked to the United States are not produced in Venezuela or smuggled through the Caribbean. Drugs are instead typically produced in Colombia or Peru and transported along the Pacific coast. The United Nations Office on Drugs and Crime has not identified Venezuela as a cocaine-producing country. Independent analysts have found evidence of drug trafficking in Venezuela, including in its armed forces, and CNN states that "the reality is more complex" in regards to the US government's claims about Maduro's involvement: "while Caracas claims to be waging war on drugs, there is also evidence of direct involvement in drug trafficking from the highest levels of government." According to Insight Crime, a more accurate description is a "system of corruption wherein military and political officials profit" by using "their positions to protect traffickers from arrest and ensure that shipments pass through a territory", in which "Maduro and other high-ranking officials permit this kind of corruption to ensure the loyalty of lower ranks".

=== Legality of the strikes ===
Experts have questioned the legality of the strikes under US and international law. The US Coast Guard or other law enforcement agencies had been responsible for US drug interdiction efforts for decades prior to the strikes, and suspects were prosecuted as a criminal matter, but according to CNN, the DOJ argued before the strikes began "that the president is legally allowed to authorize lethal strikes against 24 cartels and criminal organizations in self-defense, because the groups pose an imminent threat to Americans".

Experts speaking to the BBC said that the 2 September strike was potentially illegal under international maritime and human rights law. Though the US is not a signatory to the United Nations Convention on the Law of the Sea, previous US policy had been to "act in a manner consistent with its provisions"; countries are not supposed to interfere with ships in international waters except in cases such as hot pursuit out of a country's territorial waters.

==== International law ====
Law professor Mary Ellen O'Connell said that the strike "violated fundamental principles of international law". Luke Moffett of Queen's University Belfast, also a law professor, stated that striking the ship without grounds of self-defense could be extrajudicial killing. In October, the Associated Press stated that the Trump administration is "treating alleged drug traffickers as unlawful combatants who must be met with military force". Regarding the 2 September strike, Geoffrey Corn, former senior adviser on the law of war to the US Army, said "I don't think there is any way to legitimately characterize a drug ship heading from Venezuela, arguably to Trinidad, as an actual or imminent armed attack against the United States, justifying this military response." George W. Bush administration legal figure John Yoo has also questioned the legality of the strikes arguing that "There has to be a line between crime and war." Obama era legal figure Harold Hongju Koh said that the strikes were "lawless, dangerous and reckless". Former chief White House ethics lawyer Richard Painter called the strikes a violation of international and federal law.

Unnamed sources told The New York Times and the Washington Post that the US military used a plane during the first strike in September 2025 that was part of a US Air Force fleet painted to look like civilian aircraft. Although its radio transponder was electronically broadcasting its military identity, some legal experts opined that using a plane without visible military markings could have constituted perfidy, considered a war crime under international law. In response, the Pentagon asserted that all its aircraft and weaponry used in the strike complied with Defense Department policy, U.S. laws, and the laws of armed conflict.

A group of UN human rights experts stated on 21 October 2025 that the use of lethal force in international waters without a proper legal basis constitutes "extrajudicial executions", and that covert or direct military action against another sovereign state would represent "an even graver breach of the UN Charter". On 31 October, Volker Türk, the UN High Commissioner for Human Rights, said that the US "must halt" strikes on alleged drug boats to prevent "extrajudicial killing" and also called for an investigation into the strikes. A spokeswoman for Türk's office said Türk believed that "airstrikes by the United States of America on boats in the Caribbean and in the Pacific violate international human rights law." She added, in a statement that contradicts Trump's "armed conflict" declaration, that the strikes were taking place "outside the context" of armed conflict or active hostilities. Amnesty International USA described a strike as murder. Human Rights Watch said the strikes are extrajudicial killings. Adam Isacson of the Washington Office on Latin America said the strike "[l]ooks like a massacre of civilians at sea". In an interview with Democracy Now!, Greg Grandin said that the strike was "bringing the logic of Gaza into the Caribbean, in terms of unaccountability, impunity and an expansive notion of national defense to justify what is, in effect, just extrajudicial killing."

A former ICC chief prosecutor, Luis Moreno Ocampo, told the BBC that the strikes would be considered under international law as crimes against humanity. Referring to premeditated killing outside of armed conflict as murder, he also said: "For me, it's very clear. A crime against humanity is a systematic attack against a civilian population, and there is no clarity why these people are not civilians, even [though] they could be criminals ... and it's clearly systematic, because President Trump says they have planned and they organised this, so that should be the charge."

The UN Human Rights Council released a report in September 2026 concluding that the killings were unjustified in national or personal self-defense and added "There are reasonable grounds to believe that the reported 68 attacks that killed 223 people constituted crimes against humanity of murder under customary international law.”

===== Inter-American Commission on Human Rights =====
A case was filed with the IACHR on behalf of the wife of a Colombian man allegedly killed in the 15 September strike by Colombian president Petro's personal lawyer, Dan Kovalik, accusing "the United States of violating the rights to life, equality before the law, recognition of legal personality, a fair trial, and due process", according to El País. In an 8 December interview with Democracy Now!, prosecutor Reed Brody called the strikes murder, distinguishing them from war crimes because they took place in the absence of a legitimate conflict. He compared the actions of the US to the actions for which Rodrigo Duterte is on trial at the International Criminal Court, saying both countries had endorsed the killing of suspected drug traffickers without trial.

March 2026 Inter-American Commission on Human Rights hearing

In March 2026, the Inter-American Commission on Human Rights held a hearing on the strikes. The American Civil Liberties Union, Ben Saul, Center for Constitutional Rights, Morris Tidball-Binz, International Crisis Group and the US Department of State testified before the commission.

==== Domestic law ====
BBC News said that "Questions also remain as to whether Trump complied with the War Powers Resolution, which demands that the president 'in every possible instance shall consult with Congress before introducing United States Armed Forces into hostilities'". The US Department of Justice (DOJ) stated in November 2025 that the 60-day limit of the War Powers Resolution did not apply to the airstrikes, as they involved unmanned vehicles that did not endanger US armed forces, and on 6 November, the US Senate voted against a resolution that would have required congressional approval for further military action directed at Venezuela, following an October vote that failed to limit strikes in the Caribbean. California senator Adam Schiff and Virginia senator Tim Kaine sponsored a resolution to prevent the administration from launching further strikes without congressional approval, which failed in the Senate 51–48 on 8 October 2025.

The Atlantic and the Center for Strategic and International Studies (CSIS) suggested that Trump was relying on the authority given the president as commander in chief under Article II of the US Constitution. According to CSIS, critics say the president must notify Congress within 48 hours to gain authorization. An expert in US constitutional law from King's College London stated to the BBC that it is not clear if the strike would fall under the presidential powers granted by the anti-terrorist Authorization for Use of Military Force of 2001 (AUMF), but that the administration's use of the term "narco-terrorists" may hint at this being their legal justification. According to the Center for Strategic and International Studies (CSIS), for several decades AUMF "has substituted for a formal declaration of war", and was used in 2001 to authorize war against "nations, organizations, or persons [the president] determines planned, authorized, committed, or aided" the attacks of 11 September or "harbored such organizations or persons". CSIS states that this authorization has been "used as a controversial legal basis for US counterterrorism operations against the Taliban, al-Qaeda, and other organizations" and Joe Biden "did not seek congressional authorization for its frequent strikes against the Houthis in Yemen". Law professor Gabor Rona argued in a 2 October 2025 Lawfare article that, while he agreed with other analysts that the strikes were unlawful, they reflected a predictable overreach that followed the precedents established during the George W. Bush, Barack Obama and Joe Biden administrations following the 11 September attacks. Political scientist Peter Feaver noted that every presidential administration since Ronald Reagan's considered deploying military force in the war on drugs, but only the second Trump administration followed through.

Repatriating the survivors of the 16 October strike on a semi-submersible to their home countries for prosecution avoids a civilian court challenge to continued detention without evidence, and a military court challenge to the legal justification for treating prisoners as unlawful combatants if they were not engaged in armed conflict.

==== Survivors of initial strike ====
Hegseth in a Cabinet Meeting on 2 December 2025

Regarding allegations about the 1 September double tap strike that killed survivors, Sarah Harrison, a former Pentagon legal adviser, told CNN that "They're killing civilians in the first place, and then if you assume they're combatants, it's also unlawful", stating that in the laws covering armed conflict, hors de combat (out of combat) people "no longer able to fight...have to be treated humanely."

Experts questioned whether the survivors of the initial explosion could be lawfully targeted, with some describing the allegations about the follow-up strike as potentially constituting an extrajudicial killing. According to these assessments, the legality of the operation depended on whether US forces reasonably believed those targeted remained combatants or posed a continuing threat at the time of the second strike. According to The Guardian, the Trump administration is following a memo from the Office of Legal Counsel that has been "fiercely criticized by outside legal experts" which "says it is permissible for the US to use lethal force against unflagged vessels carrying cocaine since the cartels use the proceeds to fund violence", and by "framing the strikes as specifically targeting the boat ... put the attack on the firmest legal ground".

Time magazine reported that experts said the killing of survivors, if true, could be considered murder and a war crime, and that Hegseth could be subject to criminal charges under the Uniform Code of Military Justice, or charged under the US War Crimes Act of 1996. US legislators expressed similar concerns, and bipartisan investigations were launched by the Senate and the House Armed Services Committees. On 17 December, the Senate passed the National Defense Authorization Act for Fiscal Year 2026 with a bipartisan amendment that, if passed by the House, would require Hegseth to provide unedited footage of the strikes and their authorizing orders to both committees or lose part of his travel budget.

== Reactions ==
=== Venezuela ===
Early on 3 September, tributes containing photos, videos and names of the deceased began to appear on social media. There was no response from the Maduro administration for four hours after the strike was announced; Freddy Ñáñez, the Venezuelan communications minister, was the first Venezuelan official to address the strike. He stated that the footage of the attack was fake. Inhabitants of San Juan de Unare disagree with this version.

During his regular TV show on 3 September, Diosdado Cabello, Venezuela's Minister of Interior, Justice and Peace, characterized the strike as "fake news" "invented" by the US as a cover for regime change. In the TV segment, he called the killings extrajudicial murders. Cabello later said that Venezuelan investigations determined none of the 11 people killed were members of Tren de Aragua. A neighbor of one of the missing people disagreed with this version.

The next day, on 4 September, Attorney General Tarek William Saab said the attack never occurred.

Maduro accused the US of threatening regime change with the strike and build up of naval forces in the area. He said there were no criminal connections to drug traffickers. Delcy Rodríguez, the vice president of Venezuela, asked on 8 September, "How can there be a drug cartel if there's no drugs here?"

In November 2025, Yván Gil, Venezuela's foreign minister, issued a statement saying that "Venezuela categorically, firmly, and absolutely rejects the new and ridiculous fabrication by the Secretary of the U.S. Department of State, Marco Rubio, which designates the non-existent Cartel of the Suns as a terrorist organization," saying it is "an infamous and vile lie to justify an illegitimate and illegal intervention against Venezuela, under the classic US regime-change format."

=== United States ===
In an exchange on X, Vice President JD Vance stated, "Killing cartel members who poison our fellow citizens is the highest and best use of our military," to which writer Brian Krassenstein responded, "killing the citizens of another nation who are civilians without any due process is called a war crime"; Vance responded "I don't give a shit what you call it." Senator Rand Paul intervened in the argument, saying "What a despicable and thoughtless sentiment it is to glorify killing someone without a trial." Senator Bernie Moreno responded to Paul saying, "what's really despicable is defending foreign terrorist drug traffickers who are directly responsible for the deaths of hundreds of thousands (Note: The CDC estimates that in 2023, Kentucky had 2,077 drug overdose deaths and Ohio had 4,745 drug overdose deaths; while 2024 provisional data shows that total overdose deaths in the United States fell overall by 27% compared to 2023 numbers, from 110,037 to 80,391.) of Americans in Kentucky and Ohio."

The initial strike was welcomed by Republican senators Lindsey Graham and Bernie Moreno, with Moreno saying that "Sinking [the] boat saved American lives." Senator Mark Warner said he was worried about putting American sailors "in harm's way by violating international law", and declared that neither he, a member of the Gang of Eight, nor the Senate Intelligence Committee were briefed ahead of the operation.

A bipartisan briefing scheduled for 5 September was abruptly canceled. Warner condemned the government's briefing procedures again on 29 October. When asked for comment in response, a White House spokesperson accused the Democratic Party of "running cover for foreign drug smugglers."

In November 2025, senator Mark Kelly and five other Democratic Congress members participated in a video, telling military personnel to defy "illegal orders". Trump said those in the video were traitors who should be charged with sedition and shared a social media post that called for them to be hanged. The Pentagon announced that Kelly was under investigation after it received "serious allegations of misconduct" in relation to the "illegal orders" video.

Puerto Rico governor Jennifer Gonzalez thanked the Trump administration on 9 September 2025 for the "fight against drug cartels in our hemisphere".

Susie Wiles, Trump's White House Chief of Staff, said that Trump would "keep on blowing boats up until Maduro cries uncle." Representatives Joaquin Castro and Sara Jacobs released a letter in March 2026 in support of an Inter-American Commission on Human Rights investigation into the legality of the strikes.

In November 2025, it was reported that the Committee on Armed Services in the House and Senate had opened inquiries into the strikes. In December 2025, the House reportedly ended its inquiry. The same month, POLITICO reported that the Senate's inquiry was proceeding. The National Defense Authorization Act for Fiscal Year 2026 conditions pentagon funding on the secretary of defense providing the House and Senate committees unedited video of the strikes.

In May 2026, after stalling, the Department of Defense Office of Inspector General opened an investigation.

==== Lawsuits ====
Burnley v. United States
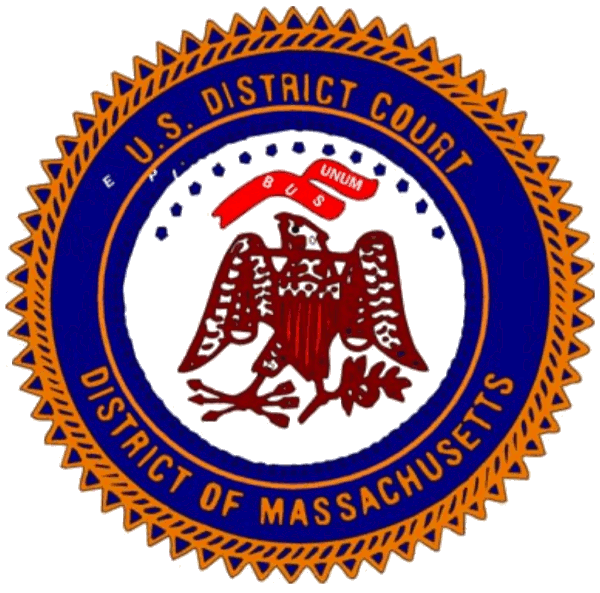
- Court: District of Massachusetts
- Started: January 27, 2026; 9 months ago
- Docket nos.: 1:26-cv-10364

Court membership
- Judge sitting: Leo T. Sorokin

Keywords
- Death on the High Seas Act; Alien Tort Statute

In January 2026, the American Civil Liberties Union, Center for Constitutional Rights, and Jonathan Hafetz filed a federal lawsuit against the United States government on behalf of the families of two people from Las Cuevas, Trinidad and Tobago who were killed in a strike on 14 October 2025. The lawsuit alleged that the strikes were "premeditated and intentional killings" that "lack any plausible legal justification" and were "simply murder, ordered at the highest levels of government and obeyed by military officers in the chain of command."

=== Other Latin American and Caribbean ===
Addressing, the first strike near Chaguaramas, Prime Minister of Trinidad and Tobago Kamla Persad-Bissessar praised the U.S. attack and encouraged more operations against drug traffickers, saying: "The pain and suffering the cartels have inflicted on our nation is immense. I have no sympathy for traffickers; the US military should kill them all violently." Raising concerns that the bodies washing ashore won't be investigated, and placing Trinidad and Tobago at odds with other CARICOM members, she supports the strikes, saying: "I much prefer seeing drug and gun traffickers blown to pieces than seeing hundreds of our citizens murdered each year because of drug-fueled gang violence." The family of one of the Trinidad missing said due process was not given and accused Trump of "killing poor people".

Colombian president Gustavo Petro said that attacking the boat occupants in drug interdictions rather than capturing them amounted to murder. On 11 November, Petro announced he would suspend sharing of intelligence with the US while strikes on vessels continued; Efecto Cocuyo reported that Colombian Ministers of Defense and of the Interior stated on 13 November that Colombia would continue cooperating with the US.

When asked whose side he was on, Brazilian president Luiz Inácio Lula da Silva said he was on the side of peace, favored negotiations, and that US forces in the Caribbean had become a source of tension. Addressing the United Nations General Assembly, Lula compared "using lethal force in situations that do not constitute armed conflict" to "executing people without trial."

Mexican President Claudia Sheinbaum stated in October: "We do not agree with these attacks, with the way they are being carried out." Mexico and the US agreed in November 2025 on a protocol whereby "Mexico's Navy will be responsible for intercepting these vessels in international waters near the country's coasts in order to prevent further bombings", according to El País.

Foreign Policy magazine described Latin America's reaction to the strikes as "disjointed" and fragmented in November 2025, "explained, in part, by ideological divisions across the region", with "left-wing leaders of Colombia, Mexico, and Brazil [as] the most vocal critics of the strikes", while "countries with right-wing leaders—such as Paraguay, Argentina, and Ecuador—have generally aligned themselves with the Trump administration's approach to drug trafficking and Maduro.

=== Other ===
During a G7 foreign ministers' meeting in Canada on 11 November 2025, the French foreign minister, Jean-Noël Barrot, criticized US military operations in the Caribbean, saying they violated international law and could contribute to regional instability. He was quoted as saying, "We have observed with concern the military operations in the Caribbean region, because they violate international law and because France has a presence in this region through its overseas territories, where more than a million of our compatriots reside," without citing specific US actions, and said that it was crucial to avoid "instability caused by potential escalations".

Canadian officials distanced the Canadian military and intelligence personnel from the strikes. Sources speaking to CNN said that Canada did not want its intelligence used for the strikes but that it intended to continue its partnership with the Coast Guard under Operation Caribbe. A Department of National Defence spokesperson stated that "Canadian Armed Forces activities under Operation Caribbe, conducted in co-ordination with the United States Coast Guard, are separate and distinct", referencing the strikes on suspected drug boats. On 12 November, when foreign affairs minister, Anita Anand, was asked whether Canada was withholding intelligence from Washington on narcotics trafficking in Latin America, she responded: "The US has made it clear it is using its own intelligence. We have no involvement in the operations you were referring to."

United Kingdom officials refused to comment on an 11 November CNN report that the UK had suspended intelligence sharing with the U.S. about suspected drug trafficking vessels over the risks of being complicit in the strikes, which it reportedly believes are illegal. A spokesperson for Prime Minister Keir Starmer stated that "the US is our closest partner on defense, security, intelligence", while declining to comment on intelligence matters. Rubio denied the CNN report, calling it a "false story". Yvette Cooper, the UK foreign secretary, responded that intelligence sharing continues, and referenced Rubio's comment about the "false story".

Amid increasing tensions, many European high-level leaders canceled their planned participation in a November summit held in Colombia between the European Union and the Community of Latin American and Caribbean States (CELAC), in contrast to the 2023 EU–CELAC summit attended by numerous heads of state.

According to Pino Arlacchi, the former head of the UN Office on Drugs and Crime, the portrayal of Venezuela as a "drug state" is a "geopolitically motivated smear campaign" by the U.S. government; he refers to the World Drug Report 2025 and states that the Venezuelan government's cooperation in the fight against drug trafficking is among the best in South America. His view is that the U.S. has taken an interest in Venezuelan oil reserves, which are among the largest in the world.

On 4 November, Chinese Foreign Ministry spokeswoman Mao Ning defended China's growing cooperation with Venezuela, saying it "constitutes normal cooperation between sovereign states" and is "not directed against any third party". She was quoted as saying "China supports strengthened international cooperation to combat transnational crime and opposes the use or threat of force in international relations." She added that China "opposes any attempt to undermine peace and stability in Latin America and the Caribbean, as well as unilateral coercive actions against foreign vessels that exceed reasonable and necessary limits." China urged the U.S. to "carry out regular judicial and law enforcement cooperation through bilateral and multilateral legal frameworks".

The Iranian ambassador to the UN in Geneva condemned the attack as illegal under international law.

Journalist Katy Balls wrote that the strikes were "a response to Beijing's fast-growing influence in Latin America."

In November 2025, Pope Leo XIV noted that the strikes were gradually nearing Venezuela's coastline and stated that they were only "increasing tension"; he called for the United States and Venezuela to "seek dialogue".

The Inter-American Commission on Human Rights called "upon the United States to: refrain from employing lethal military force in the context of public security operations, ensuring that any counter-crime or security operation fully complies with international human rights standards; conduct prompt, impartial, and independent investigations into all deaths and detentions resulting from these actions; and adopt effective measures to prevent recurrence" and urged the U.S. to "to ensure that all security operations, including those carried out beyond its borders, are consistent with international human rights obligations, particularly regarding the protection of the right to life, the use of force, due process guarantees, and accountability mechanisms."

=== Opinion polls ===
A Harvard CAPS/Harris poll from 1–2 October found that 71% of respondents supported the US destroying boats trafficking drugs from South America.

A Reuters/Ipsos poll from 7–12 November found that 51% of Americans opposed "killing suspected drug traffickers abroad without judicial process", while 29% supported it.

== See also ==
- Air Bridge Denial Program – American program against drug trafficking
- Laconia incident – War crime during the naval battles of the Second World War
- Battle of the Bismarck Sea – 1943 Allied attack on a Japanese convoy
- Japanese transport ship Buyo Maru – Japanese transport and hellship during World War II
- Ecuadorian conflict (2024–present) – Ecuadorian conflict against criminal groups in which the United States recently bombed
