= World Drug Report =

Annual UN publication

The World Drug Report is a United Nations Office on Drugs and Crime annual publication that analyzes market trends, compiling detailed statistics on drug markets. Using data, it helps draw conclusions about drugs as an issue needing intervention by government agencies around the world. UNAIDs stated on its website "The use of illicit drugs needs to be understood as a social and health condition requiring sustained prevention, treatment, and care. This is one of the major conclusions emerging from the 2015 World Drug Report, published on 26 June by the United Nations Office on Drugs and Crime."

== History ==
The World Drug Report is published annually by the United Nations Office on Drugs and Crime. The first report was published in 1997, the same year the agency was established. The agency was tasked with the responsibility of crime prevention, criminal justice and criminal law reform. The World Drug Report is utilized as an annual overview of the major developments of global drug markets and as a tool to publish evidence-based drug prevention plans. There have been 19 World Drug Reports published since the original report was made public.

== Leader of the United Nations Office on Drugs and Crime ==
On July 9, 2010, United Nations Secretary-General Ban Ki-moon appointed Yury Fedotov of the Russian Federation as executive director for the United Nations Office on Drugs and Crime Leadership. Fedotov is also Under-Secretary General for the United Nations as a whole. Fedotov has been active in the UN since 1972, when he was a member of the USSR delegation to the United Nations Disarmament Committee in Geneva. Since then, he has championed international issues around global human and drug trafficking. In that vein, he strongly advocates for supporting counter drug trafficking by building upon regional initiatives by providing technical assistance. Fedotov also promotes the idea that successful drug policies that stem from the World Drug Report have the ability to develop entire economies. On June 26, 2015, he gave remarks to announce the release of the 2015 World Drug Report. In those remarks, he said, "The report also shows that successful projects can foster a sustainable licit economy, including the transfer of skills and access to land, credit and infrastructure, as well as marketing support and access to markets." He uses his position as executive director of the United Nations Office on Drugs and Crime to encourage UN members to support these programs and initiatives through funding under the premise that this funding will grow their domestic economies.

== Research methodology ==
The World Drug Report relies mainly on data submitted by member states through the Annual Reports Questionnaire, which is revised and monitored by the Commission on Narcotic Drugs. These Member States are all required to submit national drug control related information to the United Nations Office on Drugs and Crime annually, although historically the United Nations does not receive a response from 100% of the surveyed Member States. The World Drug Report will be based on the submitted information from the prior year. If there is insufficient information submitted from a Member State or in other relevant circumstances, the United Nations Office on Drugs and Crime will seek information from additional, reliable sources, such as government sources.

There have been several attempts made to standardize and improve the reliability of information provided for the report. The United Nations Office on Drugs and Crime has noted many challenges in relying on the Annual Reports Questionnaire such as the difficulty of validating data, irregular data reporting by Member States and bridging data gaps. According to the 2015 World Drug Report, there was greater success in data reporting on illicit drug supply, 78% complete, as opposed to drug demand, 61% complete. The office has also noted budgetary constraints, as 90% of its budget is reliant on voluntary contributions.

== Structure ==
The World Drug report is an extensive and comprehensive document. The first substantive piece of the report is the preface which is written by the executive director of the United Nations Drug Control Programme and gives readers insight into the purposes of publishing this research. Next is the explanatory notes which provides readers with definitions of the acronyms and abbreviations within the report. In addition, it notes how the United Nations Drug Control Programme distinguished borders in terms of international drug trafficking and that the it measures drug values in United States currency. Next is the executive summary, which gives a heavily condensed overview of the findings of the report and includes data and graphs. Using the 2014 report as an example, data from the report is formatted in the following way:

Trends in Seizures of Cocaine
Year	Index (Baseline in 2003)
2003	1
2004	1.1
2005	1.5
2006	1.2
2007	1.4

Trends in Seizures of Cannabis
Year	Index (Baseline in 2003)
2003	1
2004	1.05
2005	0.8
2006	0.9
2007	1

Seizures of Heroin and Illicit Morphine
Year	Index (Baseline in 2003)
2003	1
2004	1.1
2005	0.9
2006	1.2
2007	1

After the preface, explanatory notes, and executive summary, the World Drug Report has two main sections. The first section is titled "Research Statistics and Trend Analysis of Illicit Drug Materials" and has several subsections. There are subsections for the following categories: global extent of drug use, health and social impacts of drugs, regional drug use trends, overview of opiate data, overview of cocaine data, overview of cannabis data, overview of amphetamine-type stimulant data, and overview of psychoactive substances data. The second section is centered around a relevant topic as determined by information compiled in the accumulation of research and data. For example, the 2014 report's second category is titled, "Precursor Control". It contains the following subsections: an introduction, a description of precursor chemicals, the potential vulnerability of the chemical industry to the diversion of precursor chemicals, the response from the international community, trends in precursor chemicals, key precursors in the manufacturing of illicit drugs, and concluding remarks. After these two main sections, the report contains annexes and a glossary.

Opioids, which include both heroin and legal pain relievers, were responsible for around two-thirds of drug-related deaths in 2017, World Drug Report revealed on June 26, 2019. The number for global opioids users contained within the World Drug Report, some 585,000 people, is more than double the previous estimate. The study from the UN Office on Drugs and Crime, also shows that the negative health consequences associated with drugs are more severe and widespread than previously thought, with around 35 million people with drug use disorders and requiring treatment services.

== Criticism ==
The report has now been criticized for its accuracy and the figures are said to be gross exaggerations of global market drug valuation. In their article, Measuring Global Drug Markets, Peter Reuter and Victoria Greenfield claim that the United Nations Drug Control Programme overlooks factors like consumer-base (using numbers from a drug consumer base like the US, for heroin, to determine the flow and price, when in actuality they only constitute around 5% of the heroin globally, and at much higher prices than Southwest and Southeast Asia). Another fundamental problem with the drug data they cite is that it reflects not the " trade flow but the estimate of turnover." The article projects an estimated valuation number for global drug market to be at $20–25 billion annually which is a stark contrast to the United Nations Drug Control Programme's $500 billion.

In their book Sex, Drugs, and Body Counts: The Politics of Numbers In Global Crime and Conflict, Peter Andreas, Kelly M. Greenhill too argue that these figures may be, and in fact often are, distorted and manipulated. They write, " Illicitness makes possible a politics of numbers." Andreas and Kelly discuss how political actors may play with the numbers intentionally. They cite a few incentives for the inflation distortion and fabrication of numbers, one of the main ones being that the government or any NGO is viewed in a positive light, if it is seen as providing good security (high number of drug confiscations) to a big threat (the inflated number of drug trade).
