= Air Bridge Denial Program =

American program against drug trafficking

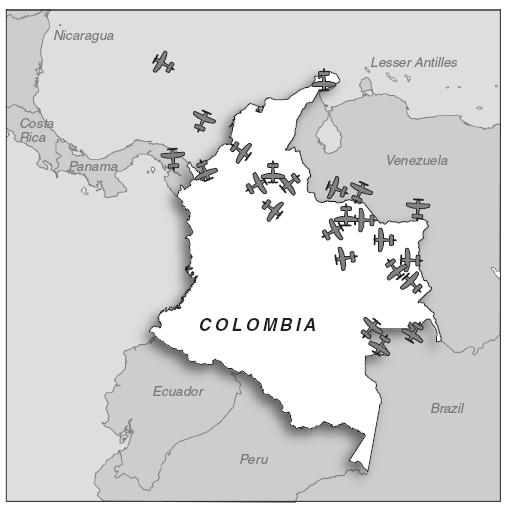
An image presented by the Government Accountability Office showing "suspicious tracks" of aircraft detected over and near Colombia in May 2005

The Air Bridge Denial (ABD) Program is an anti-narcotics program operated by the U.S. Central Intelligence Agency in Colombia and Peru. Starting in the 1990s, it targets traffickers transporting illicit drugs through the air by forcing down suspicious aircraft, using lethal force if necessary. The program was suspended in April 2001 when a legitimate civilian aircraft was shot down in Peru and two U.S. citizens were killed. It was restarted in Colombia in August 2003 after additional safeguards were established.

As of 2005, the United States had provided $68 million for the program, which had so far produced only one drug seizure. In 2010 the Government Accountability Office produced a report stating that the program faced challenges and that the effectiveness of the program at stopping narcotics trafficking was difficult to assess. It noted, however, that the program often advanced broad foreign policy objectives of the United States.

== Mistaken shootdown of US civilians ==
In 2001, a small floatplane carrying a family of four missionaries and a pilot was tracked by a CIA spotter plane as a possible drug-running plane. The Peruvian Air Force wrongly identified it as belonging to a drug smuggler, and a Peruvian fighter aircraft shot it down. Of the five people on the plane, Veronica Bowers and her infant daughter were killed in the incident, while her husband Jim and their son Cory, as well as the pilot Kevin Donaldson, managed to survive after crash-landing the plane on the Amazon River despite serious leg wounds.

On November 1, 2010 the Central Intelligence Agency declassified a 2008 CIA inspector general report that indicated that retired and current officers were given administrative punishments for their role in the incident. While the report laid the blame for the shoot-down at the feet of the Peruvian military, investigators concluded "there were problems with the program" and mistakes were made, requiring disciplinary action.

== See also ==
- Plan Colombia
- War on drugs
