= Foreign interventions by the United States =

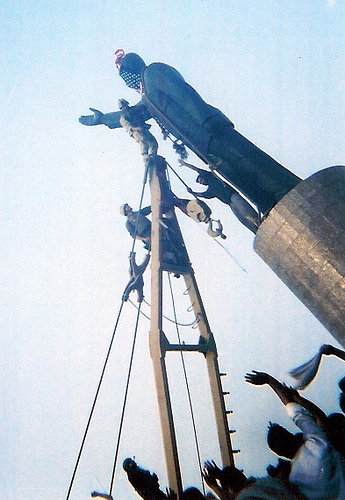
U.S. Marines raise the U.S. flag over Saddam Hussein's statue during the 2003 Iraq War.

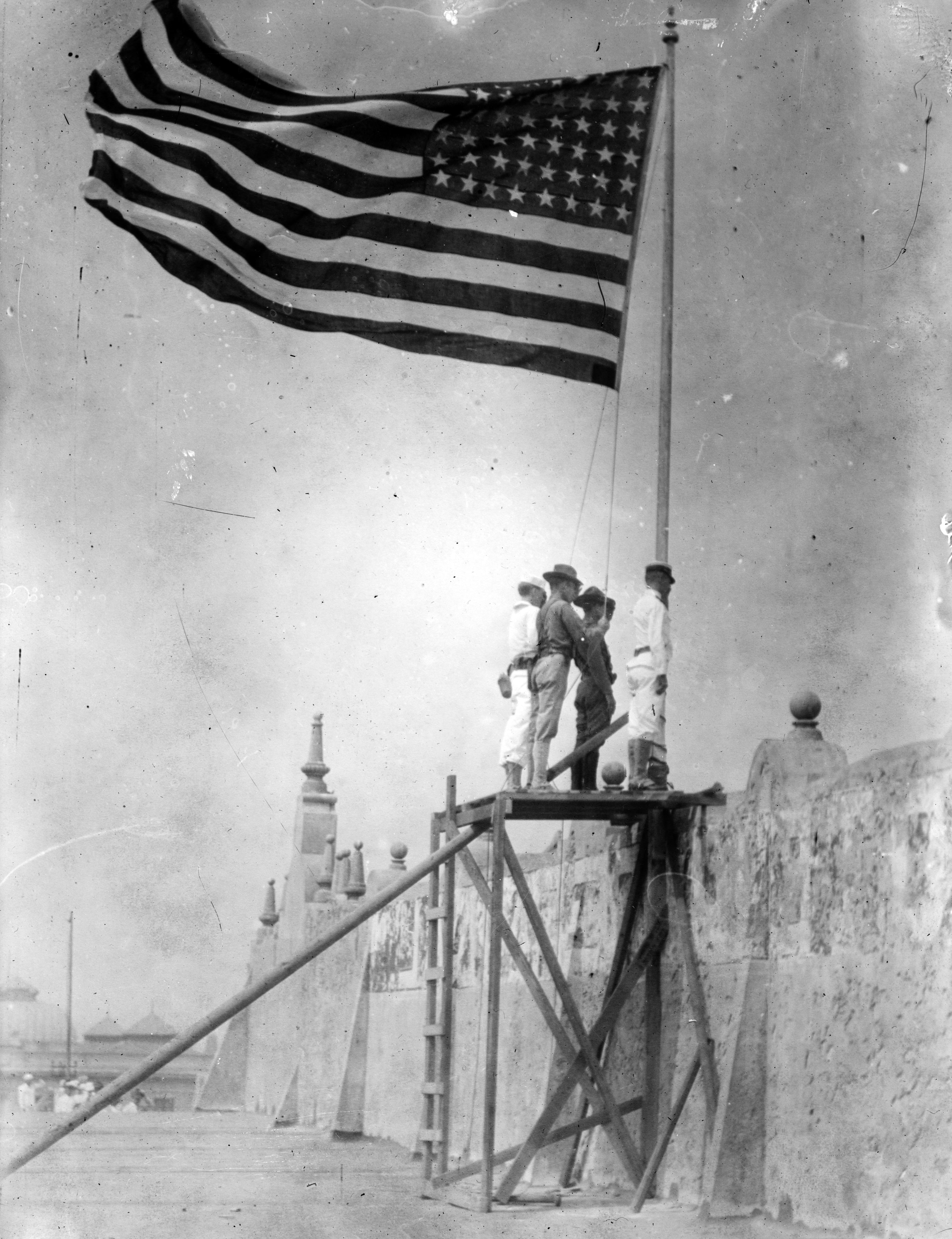
U.S. Marines raise the U.S. flag over Veracruz, Mexico during the Banana Wars.

The United States has been involved in hundreds of interventions in foreign countries throughout its history, engaging in nearly 500 military interventions between 1776 and 2026, with half of these operations occurring since 1950 and over 25% occurring in the post-Cold War period. Common objectives of U.S. foreign interventions have historically revolved around economic opportunity, protection of U.S. citizens and diplomats, territorial expansion, counterterrorism, fomenting regime change and nation-building, promoting democracy, providing aid and enforcing international law. There have been two dominant ideologies in the United States regarding foreign policy—interventionism, which encourages economic, political and military intervention in the affairs of foreign countries—and isolationism, which discourages these.

The 19th century formed the roots of United States foreign interventionism, which at the time was largely driven by economic opportunities in the Pacific and Spanish-held Latin America along with the Monroe Doctrine, which saw the U.S. seek a policy to resist European colonialism in the Western Hemisphere. The 20th century saw the U.S. intervene in two world wars in which American forces fought alongside their allies in international campaigns against Imperial Japan, Imperial and Nazi Germany, and their respective allies. The aftermath of World War II resulted in a foreign policy of containment aimed at preventing the spread of world communism. The ensuing Cold War resulted in the Truman, Eisenhower, Kennedy, Carter, and Reagan Doctrines, all of which saw the U.S. engage in espionage, regime change, proxy wars, and other clandestine activity internationally against affiliates and puppet regimes of the Soviet Union. The Nixon Doctrine reaffirmed the nuclear umbrella but wanted U.S. allies to be self-dependent, as exemplified by Vietnamization.

After the Soviet Union collapsed in 1991, the U.S. emerged as the world's sole superpower and, with this, maintained interventionist policies in Africa, Eastern Europe, and the Middle East. Following the September 11 attacks in 2001, the Bush administration launched the "war on terror" in which the U.S. waged international counterterrorism campaigns against various extremist groups—such as al-Qaeda and the Islamic State—in various countries. The Bush Doctrine of preemptive war saw the U.S. invade Afghanistan in 2001 and Iraq in 2003. In addition, the U.S. expanded its military presence in Africa and Asia via status of forces agreements and a revamped policy of foreign internal defense.

The Obama administration's Pivot to Asia strategy sought to refocus U.S. geopolitical efforts from counter-insurgencies in the Middle East to bolstering U.S. influence in East and Southeast Asia, reinforcing the first island chain and countering China's rising influence and perceived expansionism in the South China Sea —a trajectory continued by the Trump (2017–2021, 2025–present) and Biden administrations under the Free and Open Indo-Pacific (FOIP) strategy. The second Trump administration introduced the Trump Corollary to the Monroe Doctrine, aiming to consolidate U.S. dominance in the Western Hemisphere and prevent Chinese, Russian and other adversarial powers from meddling in "America's backyard." In January 2026, the U.S. intervened in Venezuela, capturing President Nicolas Maduro and constraining his government. The next month, the United States and Israel jointly attacked Iran, killing Iranian supreme leader Ali Khamenei and other Iranian leaders, sparking the ongoing 2026 Iran war.

The United States Navy serves as a key element of United States global power projection and its ability to conduct foreign interventions. As a blue-water navy, it has been involved in anti-piracy activity in international and foreign territory throughout its history, from the Barbary Wars to combating modern piracy off the coast of Somalia and other regions. The United States Air Force's strategic airlift and global strike capabilities alongside clandestine activity by special operations units are two other major components in U.S. hard power projection.

== Post-colonial ==
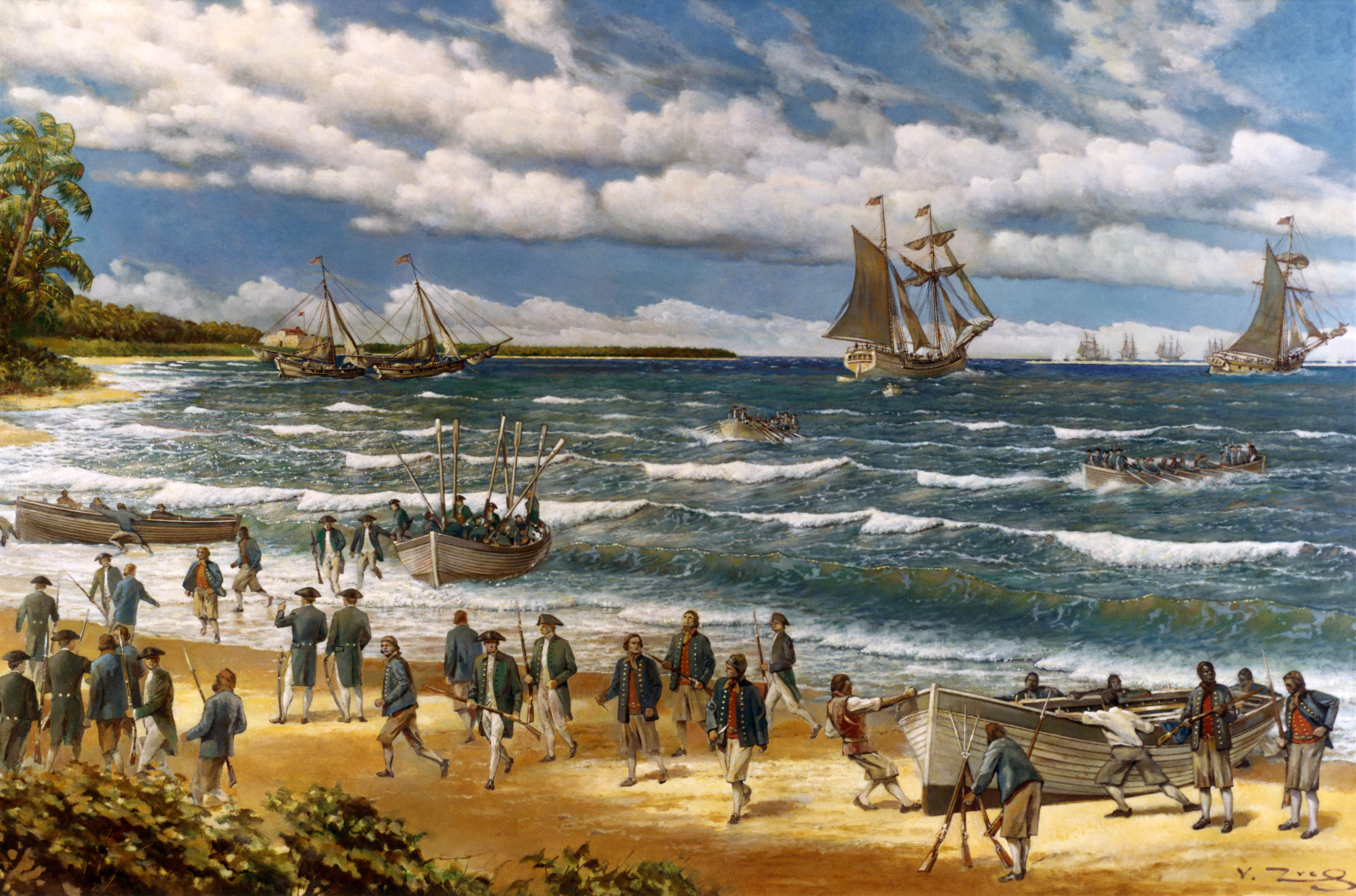
American colonial forces raided Nassau during the Revolutionary War in March 1776, as depicted by an artist in 1973.

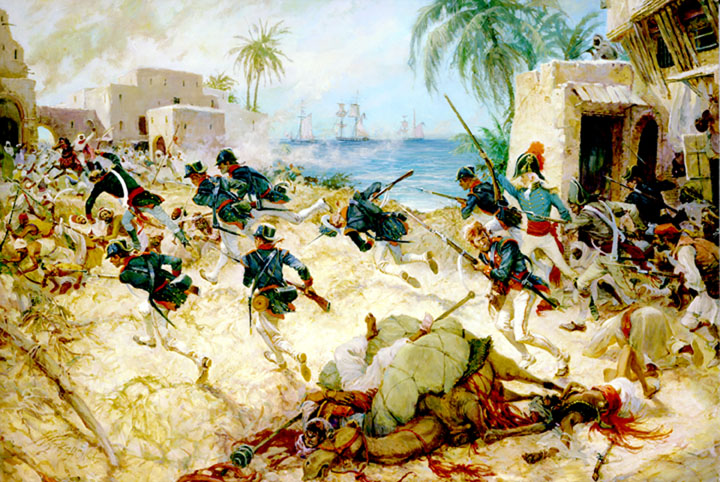
The 1805 Battle of Derna, the first foreign United States military victory, as depicted by Charles Waterhouse.

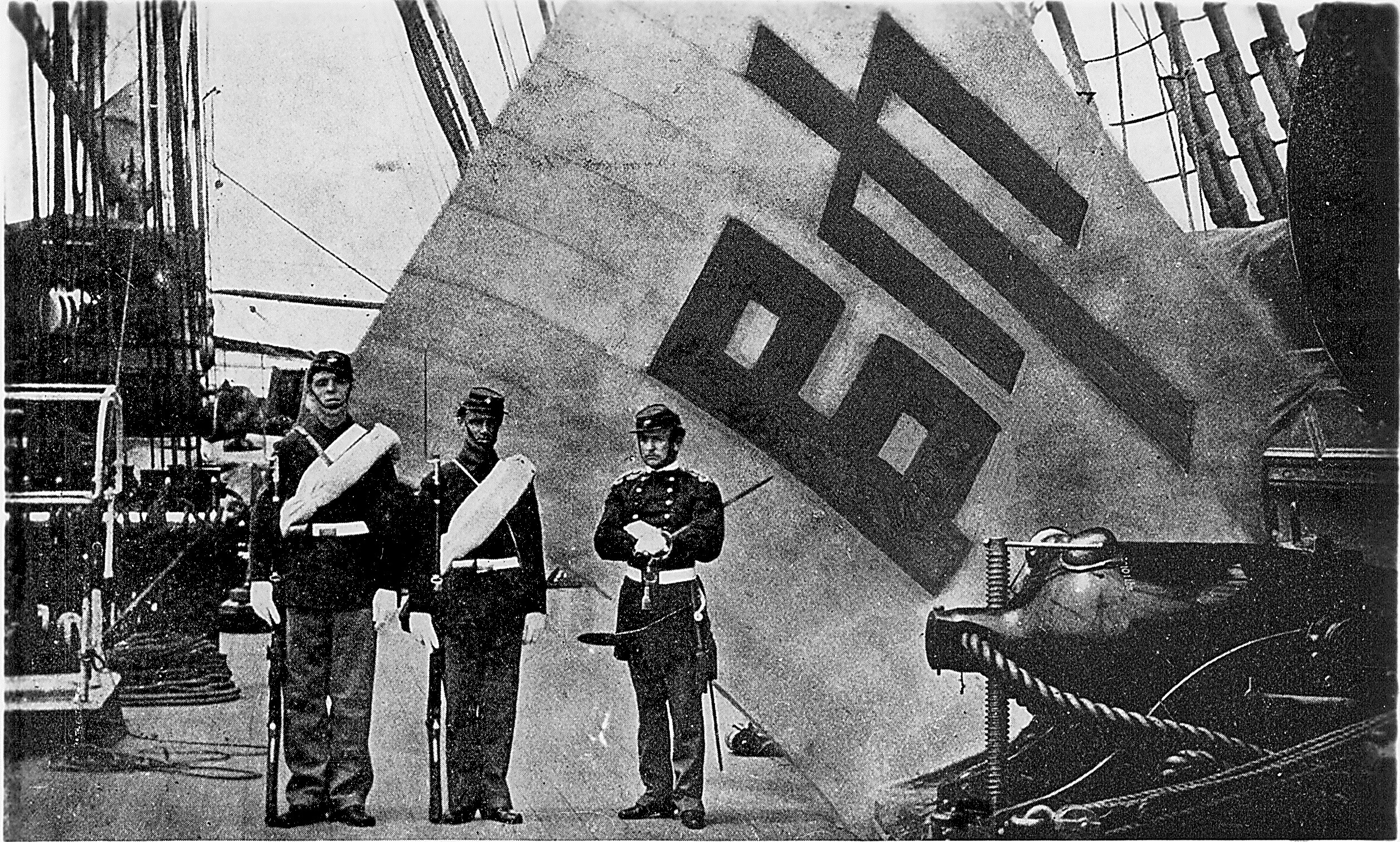
Marines of the Asiatic Squadron with the captured Sujagi during the 1871 Korean Expedition. The flag was returned to Korea in 2007.

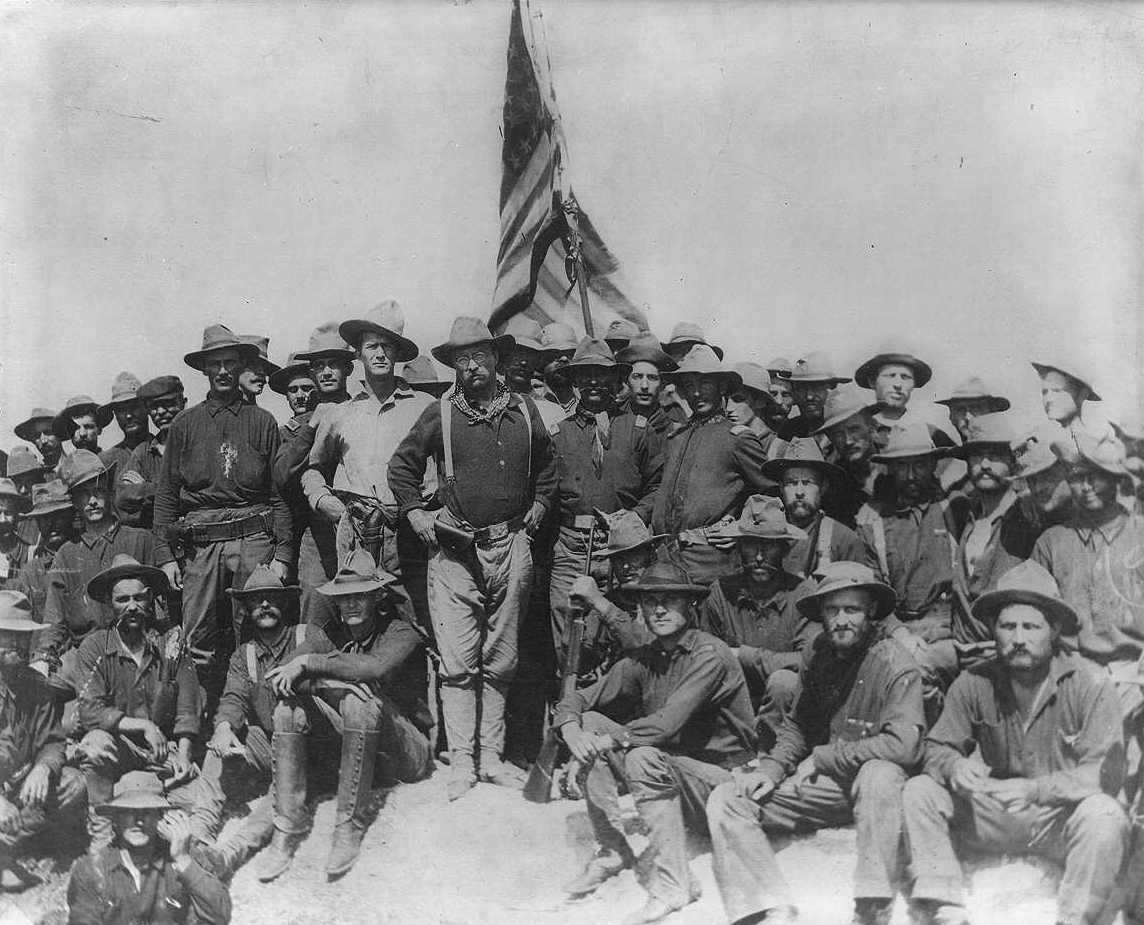
Colonel Theodore Roosevelt and the Rough Riders after capturing San Juan Hill during the Spanish–American War

The 18th-19th century saw the United States transition from an isolationist, post-colonial regional power to a Trans-Atlantic and Trans-Pacific maritime power. From 1790 to 1797, the U.S. Revenue Marine served as the United States' only armed maritime service, tasked with enforcing export duties, and was the predecessor to the United States Coast Guard. The 1794 Naval Act authorized the construction of the first six frigates of what would subsequently become the permanent United States Navy. Throughout the century, the United States increasingly engaged in gunboat diplomacy to intimidate less powerful entities and fulfill foreign policy objectives. President James K. Polk was an advocate of American expansionism under Manifest Destiny and saw U.S. territory reach the Pacific Ocean, setting the foundations for future U.S. power projection and interventionism.

The first and second Barbary Wars of the early 19th century were the first nominal foreign wars waged by the United States following independence. Directed against the Barbary States of North Africa, the Barbary Wars were fought to end piracy against American-flagged ships in the Mediterranean Sea, similar to the undeclared "Quasi-War" with the French Republic from 1798 to 1800. The founding of Liberia was privately sponsored by American groups, primarily the American Colonization Society, but the country enjoyed the support and unofficial cooperation of the United States government.

Notable 19th century interventions included:

- 1803–1860: The United States purchases the Louisiana territory from France in 1803, expanding its sovereignty west of the Mississippi River and nearly doubling the nominal size of the country across North America. The treaty of 1818 establishes a boundary along the 49th parallel north between Rupert's Land and the U.S. In 1853, the U.S. purchases 29,640-square-mile (76,800 km2) of land from Mexico, defining the Mexico–United States border.
- 1811: U.S. federal agent Joel Roberts Poinsett arrives in Chile to assess the prospects of Chilean revolutionaries during their war against the Spanish Empire, leading the first of many U.S. interventions in Chile.
- 1846–1848: During the Mexican–American War, Mexico and the United States warred over Texas, California, and what today is the American Southwest but was then part of Mexico. During this war, U.S. Armed Forces troops invaded and occupied parts of Mexico, including Veracruz and Mexico City.
- 1854: Commodore Matthew C. Perry negotiated the Convention of Kanagawa, which effectively ended Japan's centuries of national isolation, opening the country to Western trade and diplomacy. From 1863 to 1864, U.S. forces participated in the Shimonoseki campaign, a conflict over Japan's open-door policy as a result of Perry's expedition.
- 1854–1949: The U.S. Navy launches the Yangtze Patrol in 1854, an operation to protect U.S. interests, merchant ships and citizens in China's Yangtze river treaty ports and along China's coast. The mission was permanently ended in 1949 amid the Chinese Civil War.
- 1858–1859: President James Buchanan dispatched a diplomatic mission and nineteen-ship squadron to Paraguay under the auspices of seeking reparations for previous Paraguayan aggression against U.S. citizens.
- 1871: The U.S. dispatched an expeditionary force to Korea after failed attempts to ascertain the fate of the armed merchant ship General Sherman, which was attacked during an unsuccessful attempt to open up trade with the isolationist kingdom in 1866. After being ambushed, the 650-man American expeditionary force launched a punitive campaign, capturing and occupying several Korean forts and killing over 200 Korean troops.
- 1887–1889: U.S. and German naval forces engaged in a months-long standoff over control of the Samoan Islands during the Samoan Civil War. The standoff ended when a cyclone wrecked all six ships involved. The 1899 Tripartite Convention partitioned the islands into American Samoa and German Samoa.
- 1898: The short but decisive Spanish–American War saw overwhelming American victories at sea and on land against the Spanish Kingdom. The U.S. Army, relying significantly on volunteers and state militia units, invaded and occupied Spanish-controlled Cuba, subsequently granting it independence. The peace treaty saw Spain cede control over its colonies of Puerto Rico, Guam, and the Philippines to the United States. The U.S. Navy set up coaling stations there and in Hawaii. See also: Bath Iron Works
- 1899: The U.S. advanced the Open Door Policy to guarantee equal economic access to China and support of Chinese territorial and administrative integrity.

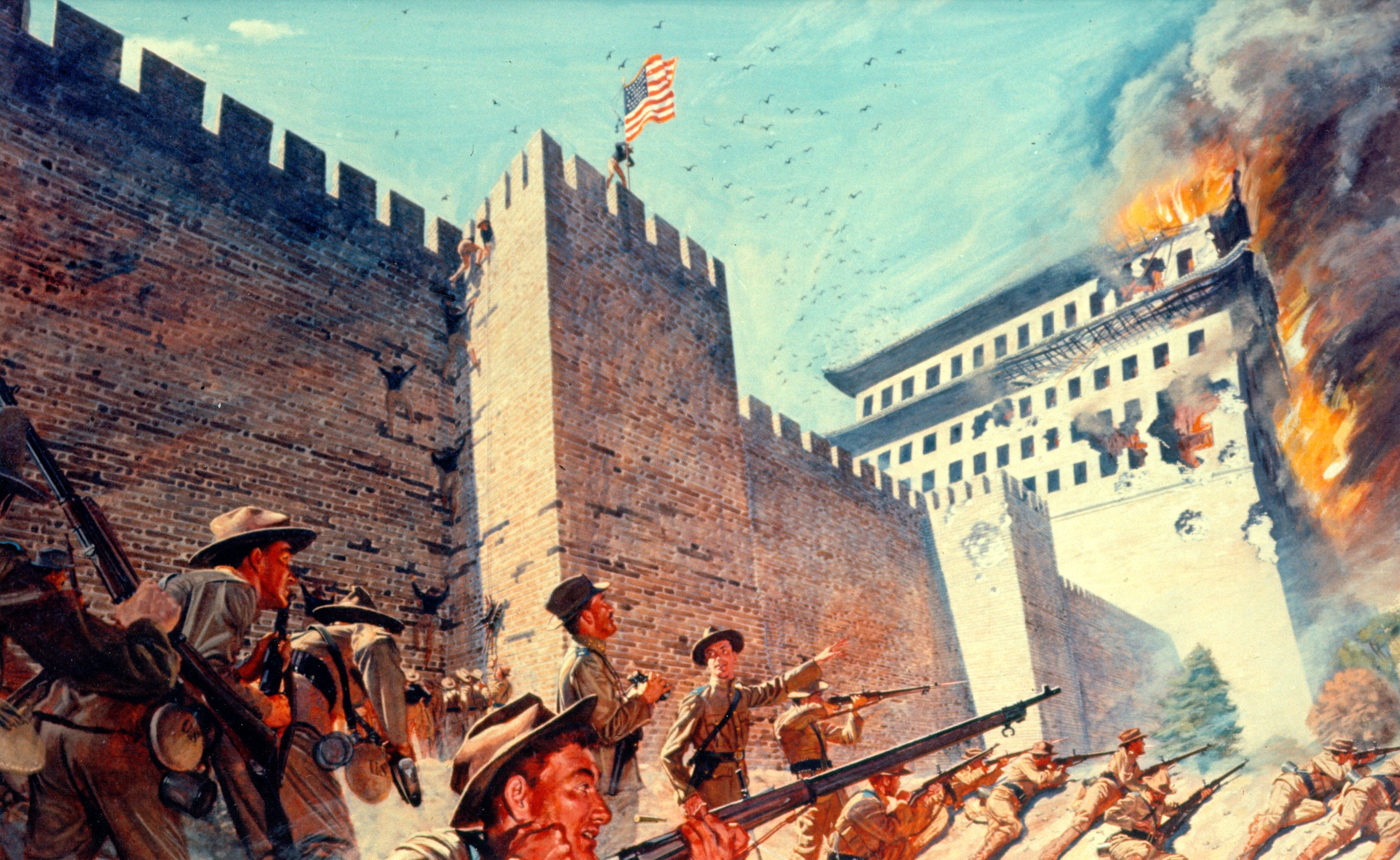
U.S. 14th Infantry Regiment assaulting Peking during the Boxer Rebellion

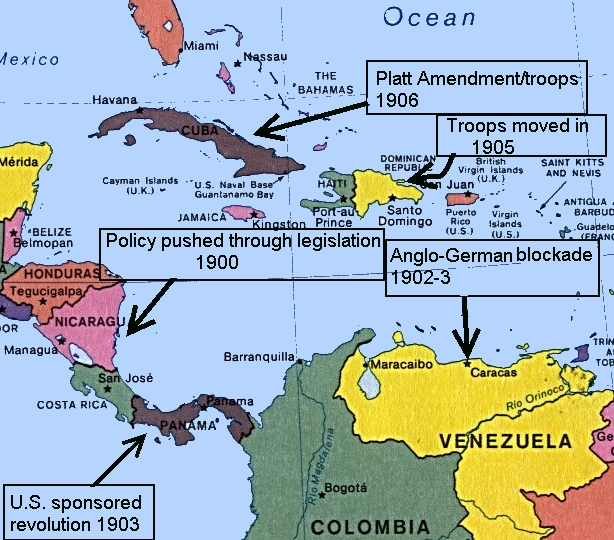
A map of Middle America showing the places affected by Theodore Roosevelt's Big stick policy

The early decades of the 20th century saw a number of interventions in Latin America by the U.S. government often justified under the Roosevelt Corollary to the Monroe Doctrine. President William Howard Taft viewed Dollar diplomacy as a way for American corporations to benefit while assisting in the national security goal of preventing European powers from filling any possible financial power vacuum. The Small Wars Manual outlined the role U.S. Marines served as an expeditionary force to project power and police countries in the U.S.'s sphere of influence. Marines were often deployed to safeguard customs revenues which were the cause of local civil wars.

- 1898–1935: The U.S. launched multiple minor interventions (Banana Wars) into Latin America, resulting in U.S. military presence in Cuba, Honduras, Panama (via the Hay–Bunau-Varilla Treaty and Isthmian Canal Commission), Haiti (1915–1935), the Dominican Republic (1916–1924), and Nicaragua (1912–1925; 1926–1933).
  - 1901: The Platt Amendment amended a treaty between the U.S. and the Republic of Cuba after the Spanish–American War, virtually making Cuba a U.S. protectorate. The amendment outlined conditions for the U.S. to intervene in Cuban affairs and permitted the United States to lease or buy lands for the purpose of the establishing naval bases, including Guantánamo Bay.
  - 1904: When European governments began to use force to pressure Latin American countries to repay their debts, Theodore Roosevelt announced his "Corollary" to the Monroe Doctrine, stating that the United States would not just prevent but militarily intervene in affairs between European and Latin American governments if European pressure resulted in the Latin countries becoming chronically unstable failed states.
  - 1906–1909: The U.S. governed Cuba under Governor Charles Magoon.
  - 1914: During a revolution in the Dominican Republic, the U.S. Navy fired at revolutionaries who were bombarding Puerto Plata, in order to stop the action.
  - 1916 to 1924: U.S. Marines occupied the Dominican Republic following 28 revolutions in 50 years. The Marines ruled the nation completely except for lawless parts of the city of Santo Domingo, where warlords still held sway.
- 1899–1901: The U.S. organized the China Relief Expedition during the Boxer Rebellion, which saw an eight-nation alliance put down a rebellion by the Boxer secret society and toppled the Qing dynasty's Imperial Army.
- 1899–1913: The Philippine–American War saw Filipino revolutionaries revolt against American annexation following the Spanish-American War. The U.S. Army deployed 100,000 (mostly National Guard) troops under General Elwell Otis to the Philippines, resulting in the poorly armed and poorly trained rebels to break off into armed bands. The insurgency collapsed in March 1901 when the leader, Emilio Aguinaldo, was captured by General Frederick Funston and his Macabebe allies. The concurrent Moro Rebellion concluded at the Battle of Bud Bagsak in June 1913.
- 1910–1919: The Mexican Border War along the U.S.-Mexico border saw U.S. forces occupy Veracruz for six months in 1914. U.S. troops intervened in northern Mexico during the Pancho Villa Expedition.
- 1917–1920: The U.S. intervened in Europe during World War I. Over the next 18 months, the U.S. would suffer casualties of 116,708 killed and 204,002 wounded. U.S. troops also intervened in the Russian Civil War against the Red Army via the Siberian intervention and the Polar Bear Expedition's North Russia intervention.

=== World War II ===
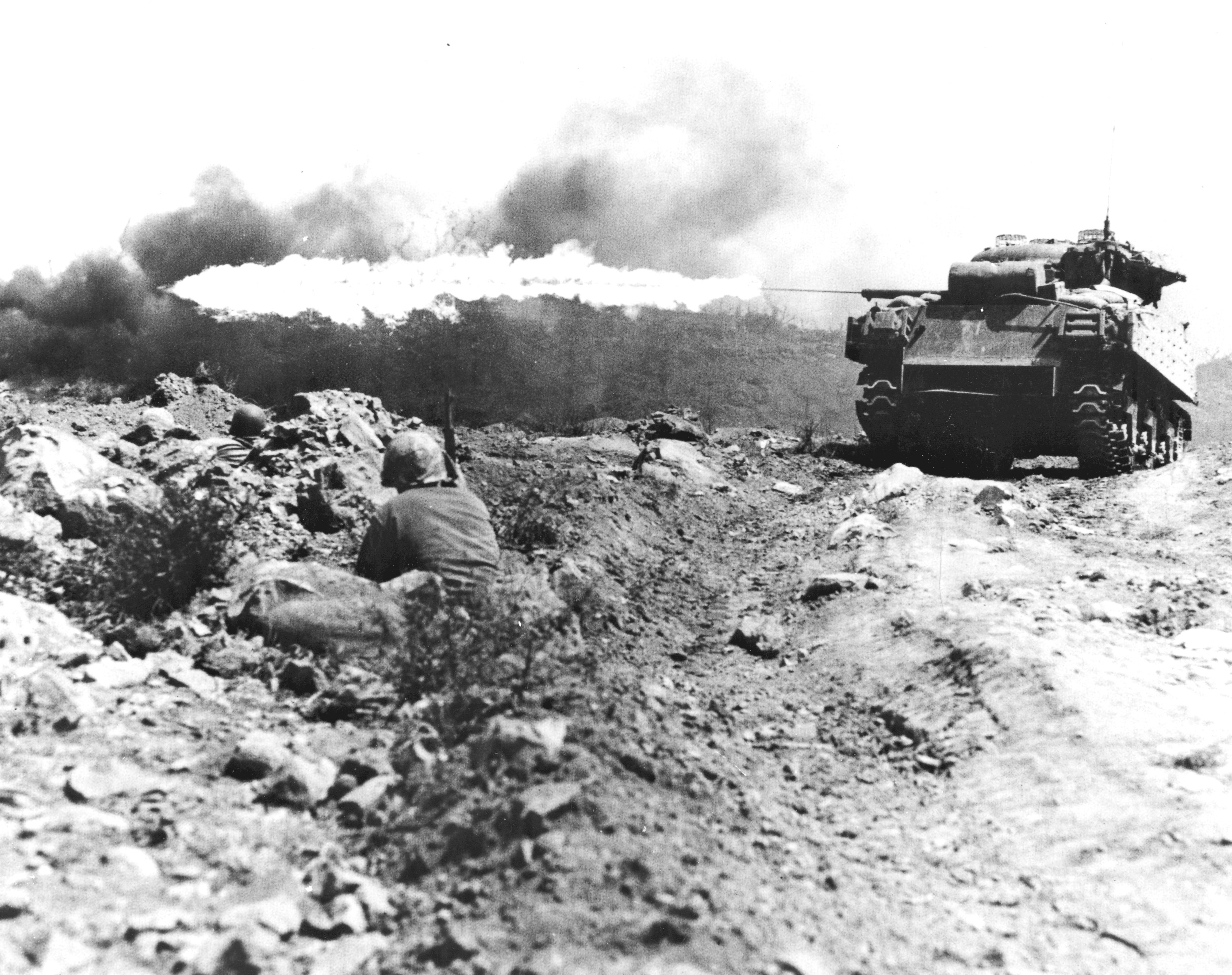
U.S. M4 Sherman tank clearing an Imperial Japanese bunker on Iwo Jima during the Second World War

A series of Neutrality Acts passed by the U.S. Congress in the 1930s sought to return foreign policy to non-interventionism in European affairs, as it had been prior to the American entry into World War I. However, Nazi Germany's U-boat attacks on American vessels in 1941 saw many provisions of the Neutrality Acts largely revoked. The Two-Ocean Navy Act of 1940 would ultimately increase the size of the United States Navy by 70%. The British-American destroyers-for-bases deal in September 1940 saw the U.S. transfer 50 Navy destroyers to the Royal Navy in exchange for rent-free, 99-year leases over various British imperial possessions. The U.S. gained the land rights to establish new military bases in Antigua, British Guiana, Newfoundland, the Bahamas, the southern coast of Jamaica, the western coast of Saint Lucia, the Gulf of Paria, the Great Sound and Castle Harbour, Bermuda.

During the Second World War, the United States deployed troops to fight in Europe, North Africa, and the Pacific. The U.S. was a key participant in many battles, including the Battle of Midway, Operation Torch, the Normandy landings, and the Battle of the Bulge. In the time period between December 7, 1941, to September 2, 1945, more than 400,000 Americans were killed in the conflict. After the war, American and Allied troops occupied Austria, Germany and Japan. The U.S. maintains garrisoned military forces in both Germany and Japan today. The United States also gave economic support to a large number of countries and movements who were opposed to the Axis powers. President Franklin D. Roosevelt's cash and carry policy was a precursor to what would become the Lend-Lease program, which "lent" a wide array of resources and weapons to many countries, especially Great Britain and the USSR, ostensibly to be repaid after the war. In practice, the United States frequently either did not push for repayment or "sold" the goods for a nominal price, such as 10% of their value. Significant aid was also sent to France and Taiwan, and resistance movements in countries occupied by the Axis.

During the war, postwar planning efforts moved from securing a "quarter hemisphere" against Nazi Germany in June 1940 to economically and then politically and militarily dominating "the whole postwar world unified under U.S. leadership. Now globalization was axiomatic, requiring no justification. American interests and responsibilities "embrace the whole world." By early 1942, the diplomats and experts recruited by the United States Department of State saw the aim of U.S. superiority as a "established fact".

== Cold War ==
Following the Second World War, the U.S. spent billions to rebuild post-war Europe and aid global development through initiatives such as the Marshall Plan. The U.S. also helped form the North Atlantic Treaty Organization (NATO) in 1949 to resist communist expansion and supported resistance movements and dissidents in the communist regimes of Central and Eastern Europe and the Soviet Union during a period known as the Cold War. One example is the counterespionage operations following the discovery of the Farewell Dossier which some argue contributed to the fall of the Soviet regime. After Joseph Stalin instituted the Berlin Blockade, the United States, Britain, France, Canada, Australia, New Zealand and several other countries began the massive "Berlin airlift", supplying West Berlin with up to 4,700 tons of daily necessities. U.S. Air Force pilot Gail Halvorsen created "Operation Vittles", which supplied candy to German children. In May 1949, Stalin backed down and lifted the blockade.

United States Forces Korea was established in 1957 and oversees a contingent of ~24,000 U.S. troops in South Korea today.

In 1945, the United States and Soviet Union occupied Korea to disarm the Imperial Japanese Armed Forces that occupied the Korean peninsula. The U.S. and Soviet Union split the country at the 38th parallel and each installed a government, with the Soviet Union installing a Stalinist Kim Il Sung in North Korea and the US supporting anti-communist Syngman Rhee in South Korea, who was elected president in 1948. Both leaders were authoritarian dictators. Tensions between the North and South erupted into full-scale war in 1950 when North Korean forces invaded the South. From 1950 to 1953, U.S. and United Nations forces fought communist Chinese and North Korean troops in the war. The war resulted in 36,574 American deaths and 2–3 million Korean deaths. The war ended in a stalemate with the Korean Peninsula devastated and every major city in ruins. North Korea was among the most heavily bombed countries in history. Fighting ended on 27 July 1953 when an armistice was signed. The agreement created the Korean Demilitarized Zone (DMZ) to separate North and South Korea, and allowed the return of prisoners. However, because an armistice is only a temporary cessation of hostilities, and a peace treaty was never signed, the two Koreas are technically still at war. U.S. troops have remained in South Korea with the stated aim of deterring further conflict.

Throughout the Cold War, the U.S. frequently used government agencies such as the National Security Agency (NSA) and the Central Intelligence Agency (CIA) for covert and clandestine operations against governments, groups, and individuals considered unfriendly to U.S. interests, especially in the Middle East, Latin America, and Africa. In 1949, during the Truman administration, a coup d'état overthrew an elected parliamentary government in Syria, which had delayed approving an oil pipeline requested by U.S. international business interests in that region. The exact role of the CIA in the coup is controversial, but it is clear that U.S. governmental officials, including at least one CIA officer, communicated with Husni al-Za'im, the coup's organizer, prior to the March 30 coup, and were at least aware that it was being planned. Six weeks later, on May 16, Za'im approved the pipeline.

From 1949 to 1956, NATO unsuccessfully attempted to overthrow Albania's communist regime. After their defeat in the Chinese Civil War, parts of the Nationalist army retreated south and crossed the border into Burma. The United States supported these Nationalist forces because the United States hoped they would harass the People's Republic of China from the southwest, thereby diverting Chinese resources from the Korean War. The Burmese government protested and international pressure increased. Beginning in 1953, several rounds of withdrawals of the Nationalist forces and their families were carried out. In 1960, joint military action by China and Burma expelled the remaining Nationalist forces from Burma, although some went on to settle in the Burma-Thailand borderlands.

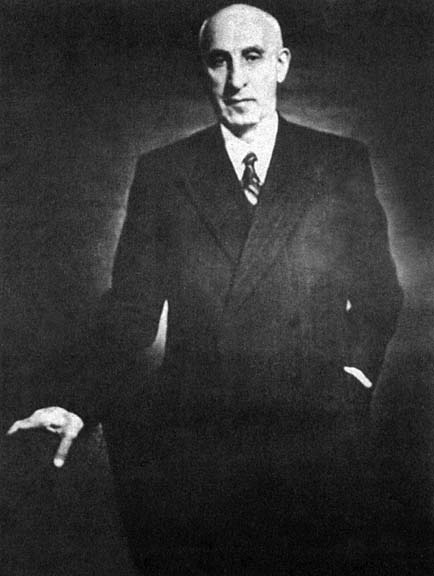
The U.S. orchestrated the 1953 Iranian coup d'état which ousted Prime Minister Mohammad Mosaddegh.

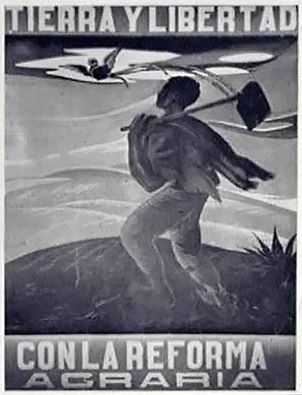
When democratically elected Guatemalan President Jacobo Árbenz attempted a modest redistribution of land, he was overthrown in the 1954 CIA Guatemalan coup d'état.

In the early 1950s, the CIA spearheaded Project FF, a clandestine effort to pressure the Egyptian king Farouk I into embracing political reforms amenable to American interests. After he resisted, the project shifted towards deposing him, and Farouk was subsequently overthrown in a military coup in 1952. In 1953, under U.S. President Dwight Eisenhower, the CIA helped Shah Mohammad Reza Pahlavi of Iran remove the democratically elected Prime Minister, Mohammad Mosaddegh. Supporters of U.S. policy claimed that Mossadegh had ended democracy through a rigged referendum. Allen Dulles oversaw the CIA's covert operations beginning in 1951 and in 1953 became the CIA's first civilian director, overseeing many covert operations until his dismissal in 1961.

In 1952, the CIA launched Operation PBFortune and, in 1954, Operation PBSuccess to depose the democratically elected Guatemalan President Jacobo Árbenz and ended the Guatemalan Revolution. The coup installed the military dictatorship of Carlos Castillo Armas, the first in a series of U.S.-backed dictators who ruled Guatemala. Guatemala subsequently plunged into a civil war that cost thousands of lives and ended all democratic expression for decades.

The CIA armed an indigenous insurgency in order to oppose the invasion and subsequent control of Tibet by China and sponsored a failed revolt against Indonesian President Sukarno in 1958. As part of the Eisenhower Doctrine, the U.S. also deployed troops to Lebanon in Operation Blue Bat. President Eisenhower also imposed embargoes on Cuba in 1958. Covert operations continued under President John F. Kennedy and his successors. In 1961, the CIA attempted to depose Cuban president Fidel Castro through the Bay of Pigs Invasion; however the invasion failed when President Kennedy withdrew overt U.S. air support at the last minute. During Operation Mongoose, the CIA aggressively pursued its efforts to overthrow Castro's regime by conducting various assassination attempts on him and facilitating U.S.-sponsored terrorist attacks in Cuba. American efforts to sabotage Cuba's national security played a significant role in the events leading up to the Cuban Missile Crisis, which saw the U.S. blockade the island during a confrontation with the Soviet Union. The CIA also considered assassinating Congolese leader Patrice Lumumba with poisoned toothpaste (although this plan was aborted).

In 1961, the CIA sponsored the assassination of Rafael Trujillo, former dictator of the Dominican Republic. After a period of instability, U.S. troops intervened in the Dominican Republic during the Dominican Civil War (April 1965) to prevent a takeover by supporters of deposed left wing president Juan Bosch who were fighting supporters of General Elías Wessin y Wessin. The soldiers were also deployed to evacuate foreign citizens. The U.S. deployed 22,000 soldiers and 44 died. The OAS also deployed soldiers to the conflict through the Inter-American Peace Force. U.S. soldiers were gradually withdrawn from May onwards. The war officially ended on September 3, 1965. The first postwar elections were held on July 1, 1966. Conservative Joaquín Balaguer defeated former president Juan Bosch.

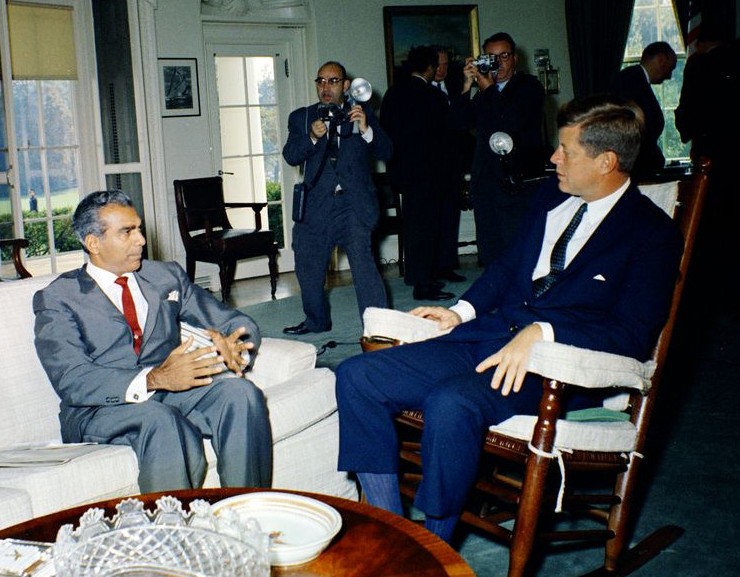
President John F. Kennedy meeting with Cheddi Jagan in October 1961. The trip was a political disaster for Jagan, who failed to sooth the suspicions of Kennedy and Congress by equivocating on Cold War issues.

At the end of the Eisenhower administration, a campaign was initiated to deny Cheddi Jagan power in an independent Guyana. This campaign was intensified and became something of an obsession of John F. Kennedy, because he feared a "second Cuba". By the time Kennedy took office, the United Kingdom was ready to decolonize British Guiana and did not fear Jagan's political leanings, yet chose to cooperate in the plot for the sake of good relations with the United States. The CIA cooperated with AFL-CIO, most notably in organizing an 80-day general strike in 1963, backing it up with a strike fund estimated to be over $1 million. The Kennedy Administration put pressure on Harold Macmillan's government to help in its effort, ultimately attaining a promise in July 1963, that Macmillan's government would unseat Jagan.

This was achieved through a plan developed by Duncan Sandys whereby Sandys, after feigning impartiality in a Guyanese dispute, would decide in favor of Forbes Burnham and Peter D'Aguiar, calling for new elections based on proportional representation before independence would be considered, under which Jagan's opposition would have better chances to win. The plan succeeded, and the Burnham-D'Aguiar coalition took power soon after winning the election in December 1964. The Johnson administration later helped Burnham fix the fraudulent 1968 election—the first election after decolonization in 1966. To guarantee Burnham's victory, Johnson also approved a well-timed Food for Peace loan, announced some weeks before the election so as to influence the election but not to appear to be doing so. U.S.–Guyanese relations cooled in the Nixon administration. Henry Kissinger, in his memoirs, dismissed Guyana as being "invariably on the side of radicals in Third World forums."

From 1965 to 1973, U.S. troops fought at the request of South Vietnam, Laos, and Cambodia during the Vietnam War against the military of North Vietnam, Viet Cong, Pathet Lao, China, Soviet Union, North Korea and Khmer Rouge insurgents. President Lyndon Johnson escalated U.S. involvement following the Gulf of Tonkin Resolution. North Vietnam invaded Laos in 1959, and used 30,000 men to build invasion routes through Laos and Cambodia. North Vietnam sent 10,000 troops to attack the south in 1964, and this figure increased to 100,000 in 1965. By early 1965, 7,559 South Vietnamese hamlets had been destroyed by the Viet Cong. The CIA organized Hmong people to fight against the Pathet Lao, and used Air America to "drop 46 million pounds of foodstuffs....transport tens of thousands of troops, conduct a highly successful photoreconnaissance program, and engage in numerous clandestine missions using night-vision glasses and state-of-the-art electronic equipment."

After sponsoring a coup against Ngô Đình Diệm, the CIA was asked "to coax a genuine South Vietnamese government into being" by managing development and running the Phoenix Program that killed thousands of insurgents. In 1968, U.S. Army Chief of Staff William Westmoreland also sought to put nuclear weapons in South Vietnam, but the project was abandoned in February of the same year after public statements by Eugene McCarthy and others revealed its plans to the public. North Vietnamese forces attempted to overrun Cambodia in 1970, to which the U.S. and South Vietnam responded with a limited incursion. The U.S. bombing of Cambodia, called Operation Menu, proved controversial. Although David Chandler argued that the bombing "had the effect the Americans wanted--it broke the communist encirclement of Phnom Penh," others have claimed it boosted recruitment for the Khmer Rouge. North Vietnam violated the Paris Peace Accords after the US withdrew, and all of Indochina had fallen to communist governments by late 1975.

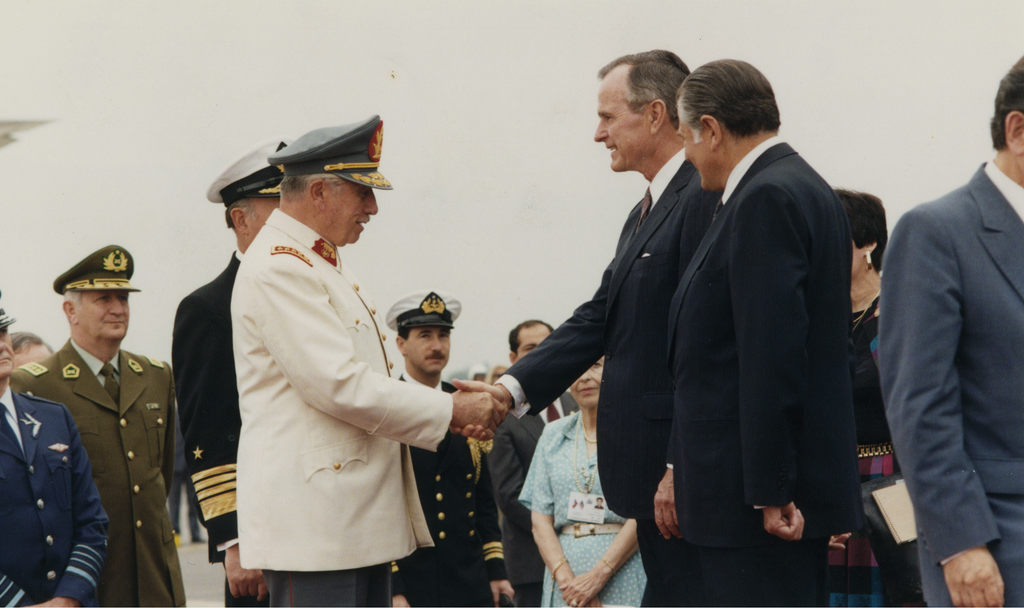
Chilean General Augusto Pinochet with George H. W. Bush

In 1975, it was revealed by the Church Committee that the United States had covertly intervened in Chile from as early as 1962, and that from 1963 to 1973, covert involvement was "extensive and continuous". In 1970, at the request of President Richard Nixon, the CIA planned a "constitutional coup" to prevent the election of Marxist leader Salvador Allende in Chile, while secretly encouraging Chilean Armed Forces generals to act against him. The CIA changed its approach after the murder of Chilean general René Schneider. Although disputed by Mark Falcoff, Peter Kornbluh and other analysts state that the CIA destabilized Chile and helped create the conditions for the 1973 Chilean coup d'état, which led to years of dictatorship under Augusto Pinochet.

From October 1972 to March 1975, the CIA armed Kurdish rebels fighting the Ba'athist government of Iraq. The Kurds suffered a total defeat after Iran and Iraq agreed to resolve their border dispute, leading to a cessation of U.S., Israeli, and Iranian sponsorship. In 1973, Nixon authorized Operation Nickel Grass, an overt strategic airlift to deliver weapons and supplies to Israel during the Yom Kippur War, after the Soviet Union began sending arms to Syria and Egypt. The same year, Libyan leader Muammar Gaddafi claimed the Gulf of Sidra as sovereign territory and closed the bay, prompting the U.S. to conduct freedom of navigation operations in the area, as it saw Libya's claims as internationally illegitimate. The dispute resulted in Libyan-U.S. confrontations, including an incident in 1981 in which two U.S. F-14 Tomcats shot down two Libyan Su-22 Fitters over the gulf. In response to purported Libyan involvement in international terrorism, specifically the 1985 Rome and Vienna airport attacks, the Reagan administration launched Operation Attain Document in early 1986, which saw operations in March 1986 that killed 72 Libyans and destroyed multiple boats and SAM sites. In April 1986, the U.S. bombed Libya again, killing over 40 Libyan soldiers and up to 30 civilians. The U.S. shot down two Libyan Air Force MiG-23 fighters 40 miles (64 km) north of Tobruk in 1989.

Months after the Saur Revolution brought a communist regime to power in Afghanistan, the U.S. began offering limited financial aid to Afghan dissidents through Pakistan's Inter-Services Intelligence, although the Carter administration rejected Pakistani requests to provide arms. After the Iranian Revolution, the United States sought rapprochement with the Afghan government—a prospect that the USSR found unacceptable due to the weakening Soviet leverage over the regime. The Soviets invaded Afghanistan in December 1979 to depose Hafizullah Amin and install a puppet regime led by Babrak Karmal. Disgusted by the collapse of détente, President Jimmy Carter began covertly arming Afghan mujahideen in a program called Operation Cyclone.

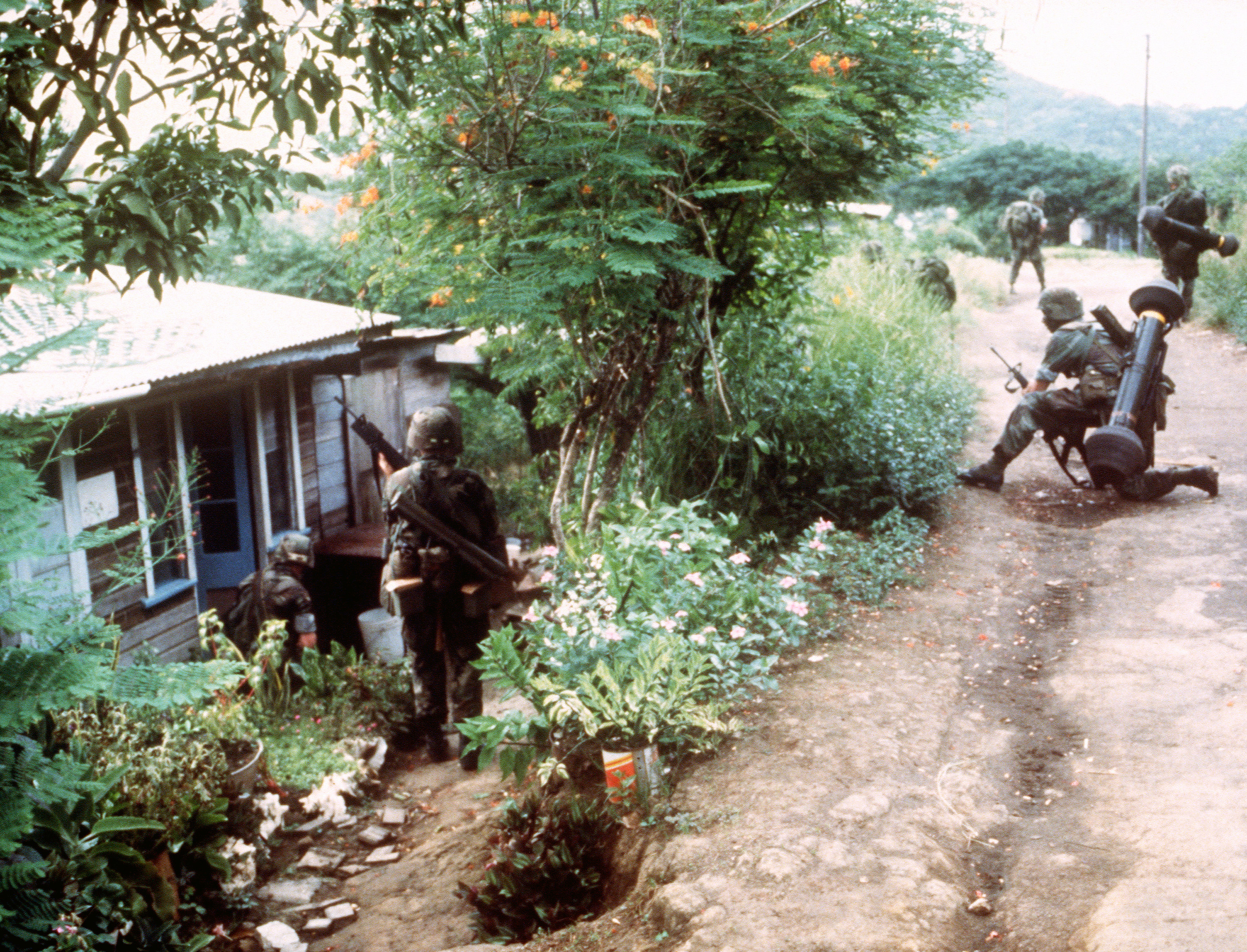
82nd Airborne soldiers during Operation Urgent Fury, the American invasion of Grenada in October 1983

Operation Cyclone was greatly expanded under President Ronald Reagan as part of the Reagan Doctrine. In accordance to this doctrine, the CIA also supported the UNITA movement in Angola, the Solidarity movement in Poland, the Contras in Nicaragua, and the Khmer People's National Liberation Front in Cambodia. U.S. and UN forces later supervised free elections in Cambodia. Under Reagan, the US sent troops to Lebanon during the Lebanese Civil War as part of a peace-keeping mission, later withdrawing after 241 servicemen were killed in the Beirut barracks bombing. In Operation Earnest Will, U.S. warships escorted reflagged Kuwaiti oil tankers to protect them from Iranian attacks during the Iran–Iraq War. The United States Navy launched Operation Praying Mantis in retaliation for the Iranian mining of the Persian Gulf during the war and the subsequent damage to an American warship. The attack helped pressure Iran to agree to a ceasefire with Iraq later that summer, ending the eight-year war.

Under Carter and Reagan, the CIA repeatedly intervened to prevent right-wing coups in El Salvador and the U.S. frequently threatened aid suspensions to curtail government atrocities in the Salvadoran Civil War. As a result, the death squads made plans to kill the U.S. Ambassador. In 1983, after an internal power struggle ended with the deposition and murder of revolutionary Prime Minister Maurice Bishop, the U.S. invaded Grenada in Operation Urgent Fury and held free elections. In 1989, President George H. W. Bush ordered an invasion of Panama to depose dictator Manuel Noriega in Operation Nifty Package. Noriega had been giving military aid to Contra groups in Nicaragua at the request of the US, which in turn tolerated his drug trafficking activities, known since the 1960s. Under Bush, the CIA provided Noriega with hundreds of thousands of dollars for his assistance to the groups. The DEA was eventually permitted to indict him for drug trafficking after documents regarding the CIA activities in Nicaragua fell into the hands of the Sandinistas. He surrendered to US soldiers on January 3, 1990, and was sentenced by a US court to 45 years in prison.

== Post-Cold War ==
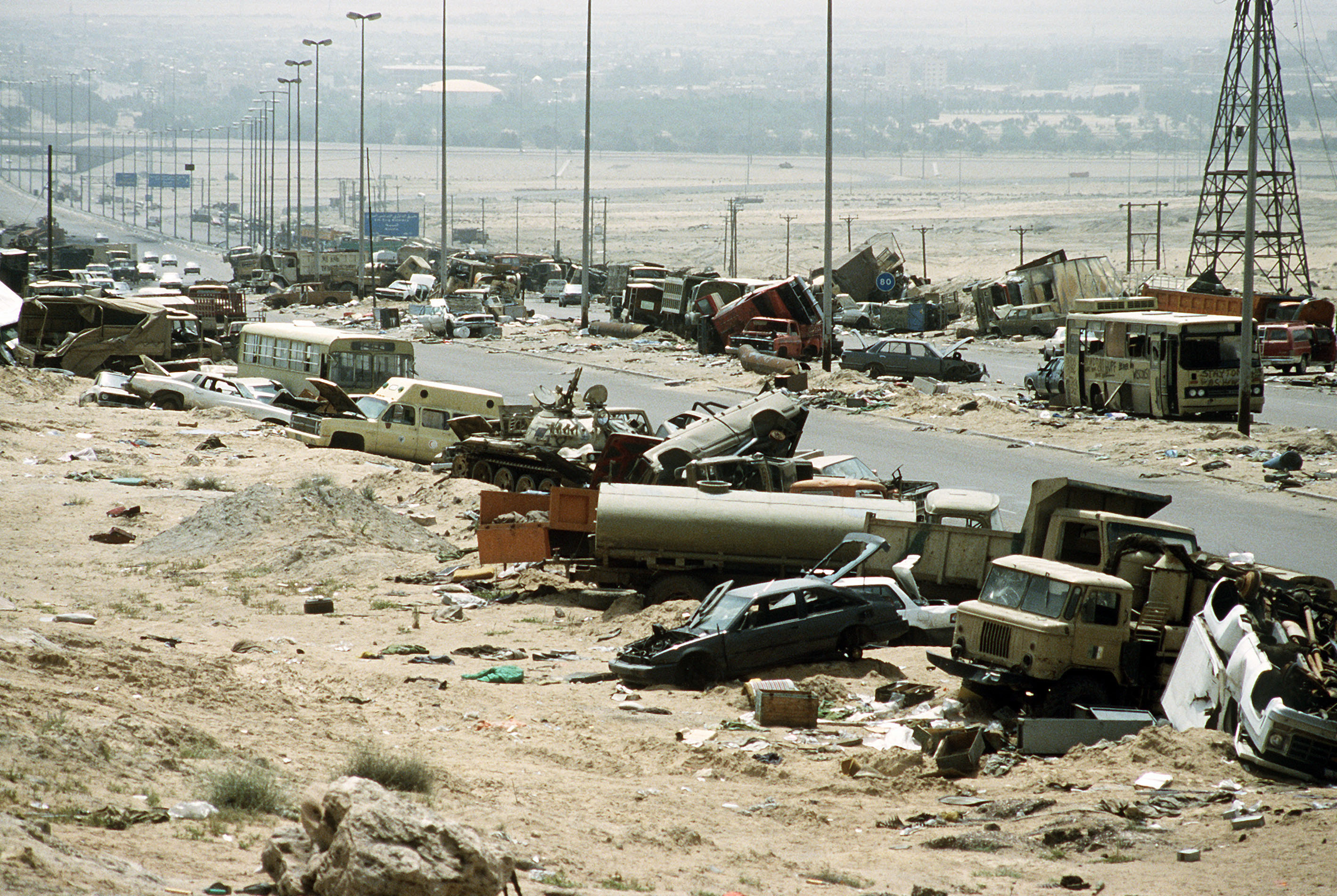
Destroyed vehicles along the Highway of Death in 1991, a legacy of the Gulf War

In 1990 and 1991, the U.S. intervened in Kuwait after a series of failed diplomatic negotiations, and led a coalition to repel invading Iraqi forces led by dictator Saddam Hussein, in what became known as the Gulf War. In February 1991, the coalition succeeded in driving out the Iraqi forces. The U.S., UK, and France responded to popular Shia and Kurdish demands for no-fly zones, and intervened by enforcing them in Iraq's south and north to protect the Shia and Kurdish populations from Saddam's regime. The no-fly zones cut off Saddam from the country's Kurdish north, effectively granting autonomy to the Kurds, and would stay active for 12 years until the 2003 invasion of Iraq. The CIA was also involved in the failed 1996 coup attempt against Saddam and in December 1998, the U.S. and UK bombed Iraqi forces due to Iraq's failure to comply with UN inspectors searching for weapons of mass destruction.

In the 1990s, the U.S. intervened in Somalia as part of UNOSOM I and UNOSOM II, a United Nations humanitarian relief operation During the 1993 battle of Mogadishu, two U.S. helicopters were shot down by rocket-propelled grenade attacks to their tail rotors, trapping soldiers behind enemy lines. This resulted in a brief but bitter street firefight; 18 Americans and more than 300 Somalis were killed. Under President Bill Clinton, the U.S. participated in Operation Uphold Democracy, a UN mission to reinstate the elected president of Haiti, Jean-Bertrand Aristide, after a military coup.

In response to the 1998 al-Qaeda bombings of U.S. embassies in East Africa that killed a dozen Americans and hundreds of Africans, President Clinton ordered Operation Infinite Reach on August 20, 1998, in which the U.S. Navy launched cruise missiles at al-Qaeda training camps in Afghanistan and a pharmaceutical factory in Sudan believed to be producing chemical weapons for the terror group. It was the first publicly acknowledged preemptive strike against a violent non-state actor conducted by the U.S. military.

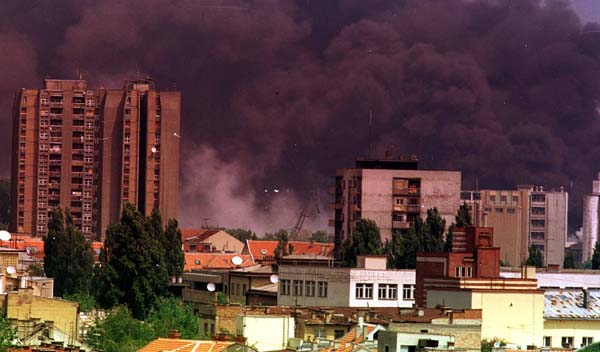
U.S. forces participated in the 1999 NATO bombing of Yugoslavia.

In 1995, the U.S. and NATO militarily intervened in Bosnia and Herzegovina against the Army of Republika Srpska as part of Operation Deliberate Force, an air campaign aimed at halting attacks on UN safe zones and civilians. Clinton deployed U.S. peacekeepers to Bosnia in late 1995, to uphold the subsequent Dayton Agreement. The Police of Serbia and the Yugoslav army carried out numerous war crimes in the Kosovo War, including an ethnic cleansing of Albanians in the former Federal Republic of Yugoslavia. Several attempts were made by the UN and NATO to end the Kosovo War, including the Rabouillet Agreement, but Yugoslavia refused to sign. As a result of the continued cleansing, NATO launched a bombing campaign against the country in 1999 with U.S. involvement, nicknamed Operation Allied Force.

A 2016 study by Carnegie Mellon University professor Dov Levin found that the United States intervened in 81 foreign elections between 1946 and 2000, with the majority of those being through covert, rather than overt, actions. A 2021 review of the existing literature found that foreign interventions since World War II tend overwhelmingly to fail to achieve their purported objectives.

== War on terror ==
After the September 11 attacks, under President George W. Bush, the U.S. and NATO launched the global war on terror. Alongside conventional ground interventions, the war on terror saw the U.S. military and intelligence community evolve its asymmetric warfare capabilities, seeing the extensive usage of drone strikes and special operations in various foreign countries including Afghanistan, Pakistan, Yemen, and Somalia against suspected terrorist groups and their leadership. The war on terror also continued the United States' legacy of waging undeclared wars, with the U.S. Congress only formally declaring war 11 times as of September 2024, with the last declaration occurring in 1942 during the Second World War.

=== Operation Enduring Freedom and Iraq invasion ===
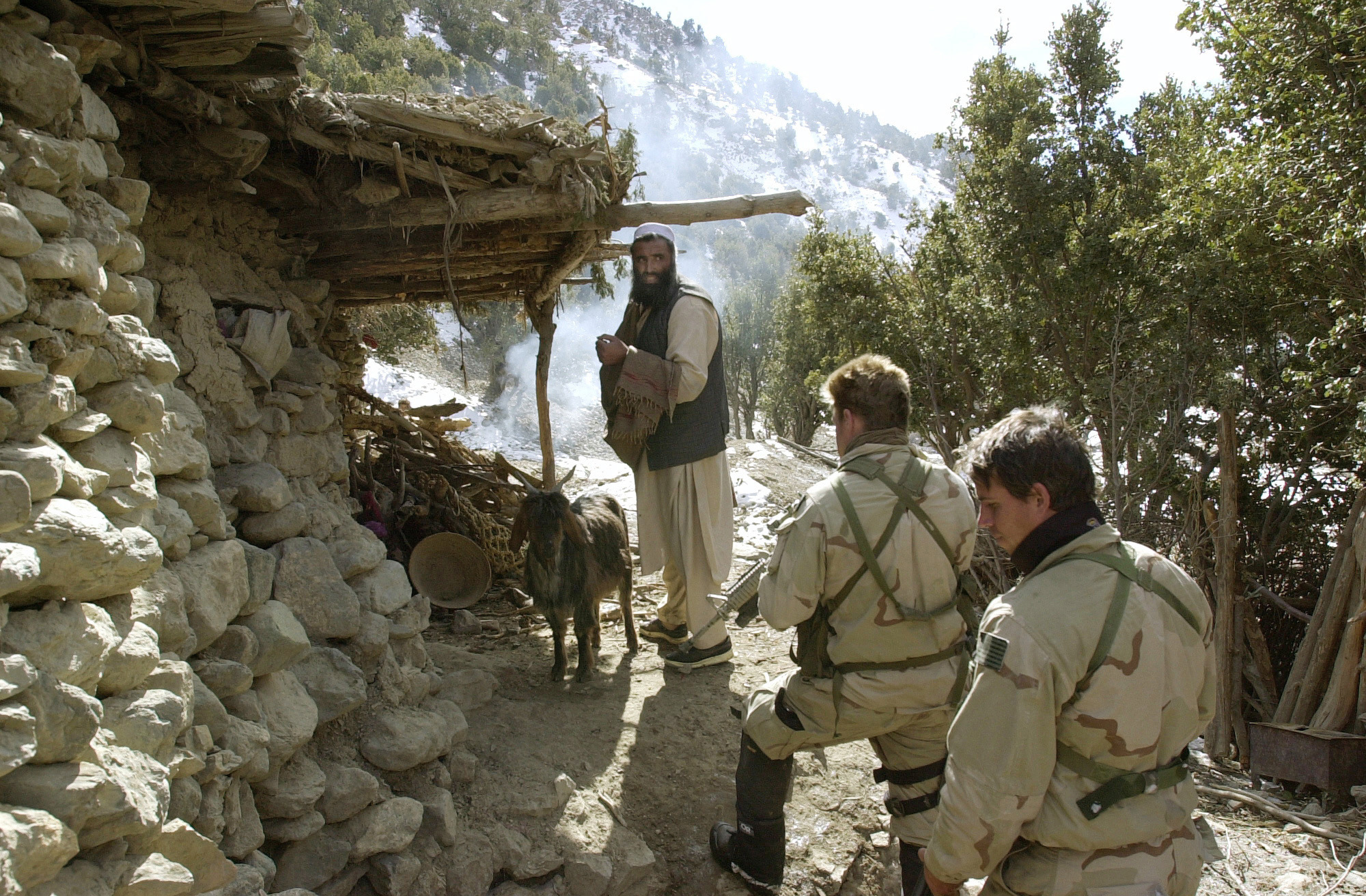
U.S. Navy SEALs in the Afghan mountains during the War in Afghanistan, January 2002

The war on terror began in earnest when the U.S. invaded Afghanistan in October 2001 to depose the Taliban government in the Afghan War, which the U.S. suspected of protecting al-Qaeda. In December 2009, President Barack Obama ordered a "surge" in U.S. forces to Afghanistan, deploying an additional 30,000 troops to fight al-Qaeda and the Taliban insurgency, before ordering a drawdown in 2011. Afghanistan continued to host U.S. and NATO counter-terror and counterinsurgency operations (ISAF/Resolute Support and operations Enduring Freedom/Freedom's Sentinel) until 2021, when the Taliban retook control of Afghanistan amidst the negotiated American-led withdrawal from the country. Over 2,400 Americans, 18 CIA operatives, and over 1,800 civilian contractors, died in the Afghan War. The war in Afghanistan became the longest war in United States history, lasting 19 years and ten months–surpassing the length of the Vietnam War, which lasted 19 years and five months–and cost the U.S. over $2 trillion.

Though "Operation Enduring Freedom" (OEF) usually refers to the 2001–2014 phase of the War in Afghanistan, the term is also the U.S. military's official name for the war on terror, and has multiple subordinate operations which see American military forces deployed in regions across the world in the name of combating terrorism, often in collaboration with the host nation's central government via security cooperation and status of forces agreements:

- Operation Enduring Freedom – Horn of Africa (OEF-HOA): U.S. forces deployed in Ethiopia, Kenya, Liberia, Mauritius, Rwanda, Seychelles, Somalia, Tanzania, and Uganda.
  - Camp Lemonnier is the only permanent U.S. military base in Africa, established in Djibouti in 2002, and supports OEF-HOA operations.
  - The Peace Corps re-established a presence in Comoros in 2015, and Kentucky National Guard personnel have trained Comoros troops.
  - The first Trump administration increased drone strikes in Somalia and in 2020 launched Operation Octave Quartz, which saw U.S. troops dispersed from the nation and re-positioned to other military bases in the region.
- Operation Enduring Freedom – Trans Sahara (OEF-TS): U.S. forces deployed in Algeria, Burkina Faso, Cameroon, Chad, Mali, Mauritania, Morocco, Niger, Nigeria, Senegal, and Tunisia.
  - In 2013, the U.S. began providing transport aircraft to the French Armed Forces during the Mali War.
  - President Barack Obama deployed up to 300 U.S. troops to Cameroon in October 2015 to conduct intelligence, surveillance and reconnaissance operations against the Boko Haram terrorist group. Contingency Location Garoua, a U.S. Army outpost housing around 200 troops and contractors in Garoua, was established by 2017.
  - U.S. forces intervened in Niger in 2013 to support French counter-terrorism efforts. In October 2017, four U.S. special operations soldiers and five Nigeriens were killed during an Islamic State ambush in Niger in October 2017. There were around 800 U.S. military personnel in Niger at the time, most of whom were working on constructing a secondary drone base for U.S. and French aircraft in Agadez. U.S. forces withdrew from Niger in 2024 at the request of the country's military junta, losing access to Niger Air Base 201, the largest drone base in Africa built by the U.S.
  - U.S. forces conducted airstrikes against Islamic State – Sahel Province (ISSP) targets in Nigeria's Sokoto State on December 25, 2025, in coordination with the Nigerian government. In February 2026, the U.S. deployed around 200 troops to the country to train Nigerian forces amid the Boko Haram insurgency.
- Operation Enduring Freedom – Philippines
- Operation Enduring Freedom – Caribbean and Central America (OEF-CCA)
- Operation Enduring Freedom – Kyrgyzstan
- Operation Enduring Freedom – Pankisi Gorge

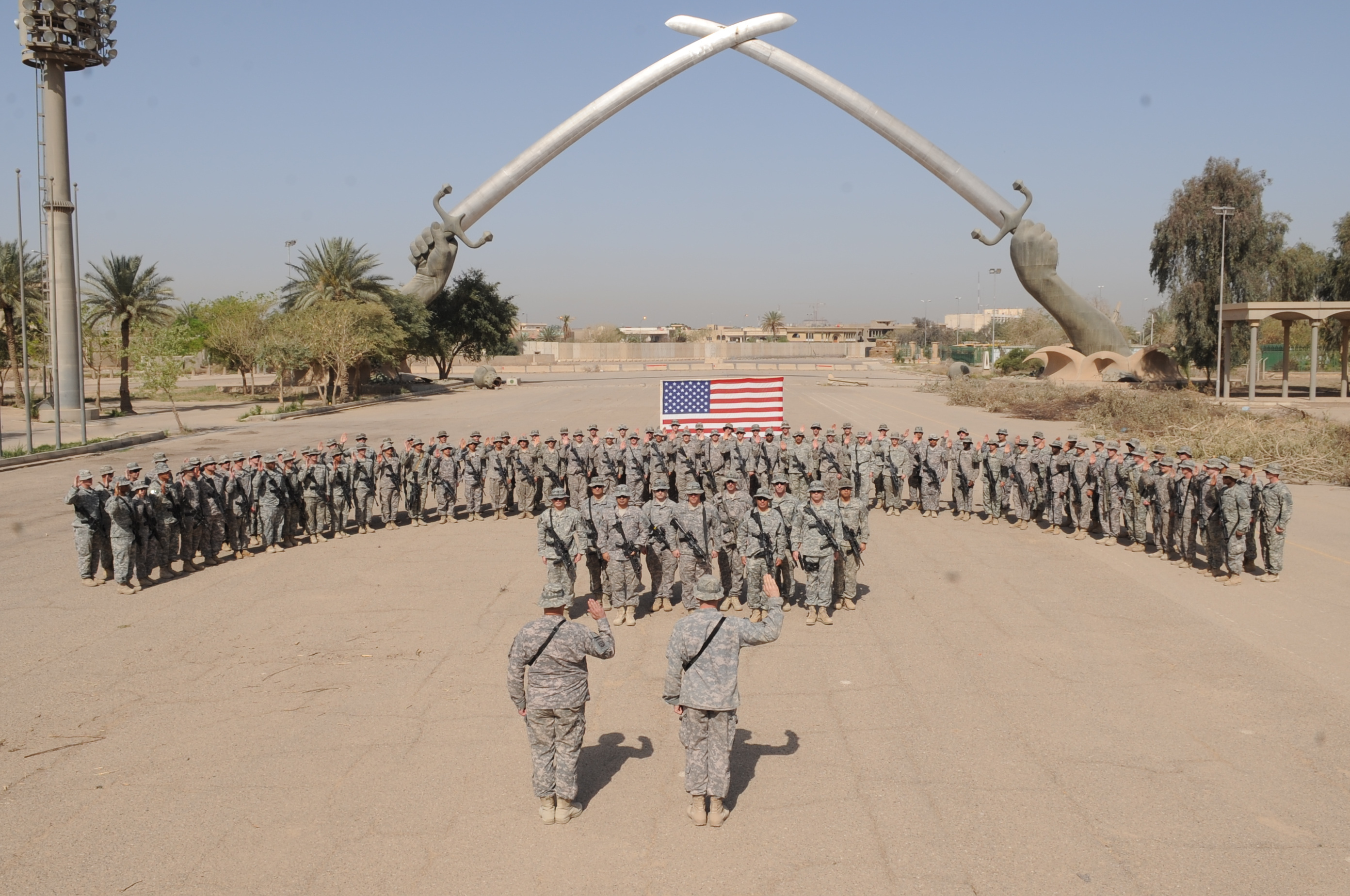
82nd Airborne at the Victory Arch in Baghdad, Iraq, 2009. U.S. forces established the Green Zone in Baghdad during the 2003 invasion of Iraq.

In 2003, the U.S. and a multi-national coalition invaded and occupied Iraq to depose President Saddam Hussein, whom the Bush administration accused of having links to al-Qaeda and possessing weapons of mass destruction (WMDs) during the Iraq disarmament crisis. No stockpiles of WMDs were discovered besides about 500 degraded and abandoned chemical munitions leftover from the Iran–Iraq War in the 1980s, which the Iraq Survey Group deemed "not militarily significant". The U.S. Senate Select Committee on Intelligence found no substantial evidence of links between Iraq and al-Qaeda and President Bush later admitted that "much of the intelligence turned out to be wrong". Over 4,400 Americans and hundreds of thousands of Iraqi civilians died during the Iraq War, which officially ended on December 18, 2011. The 2011 American withdrawal from Iraq was in accordance with the U.S.–Iraq Status of Forces Agreement.

In the late 2000s, the United States Naval Forces Europe-Africa built the Africa Partnership Station to train coastal African nations in maritime security, including enforcing laws in their territorial waters and exclusive economic zones and combating piracy, smuggling, and illegal fishing. By 2009, the U.S. provided large amounts of aid and counterinsurgency training to enhance stability and reduce violence in President Álvaro Uribe's war-ravaged Colombia, in what has been called "the most successful nation-building exercise by the United States in this century".

=== Arab Spring and Operation Inherent Resolve ===
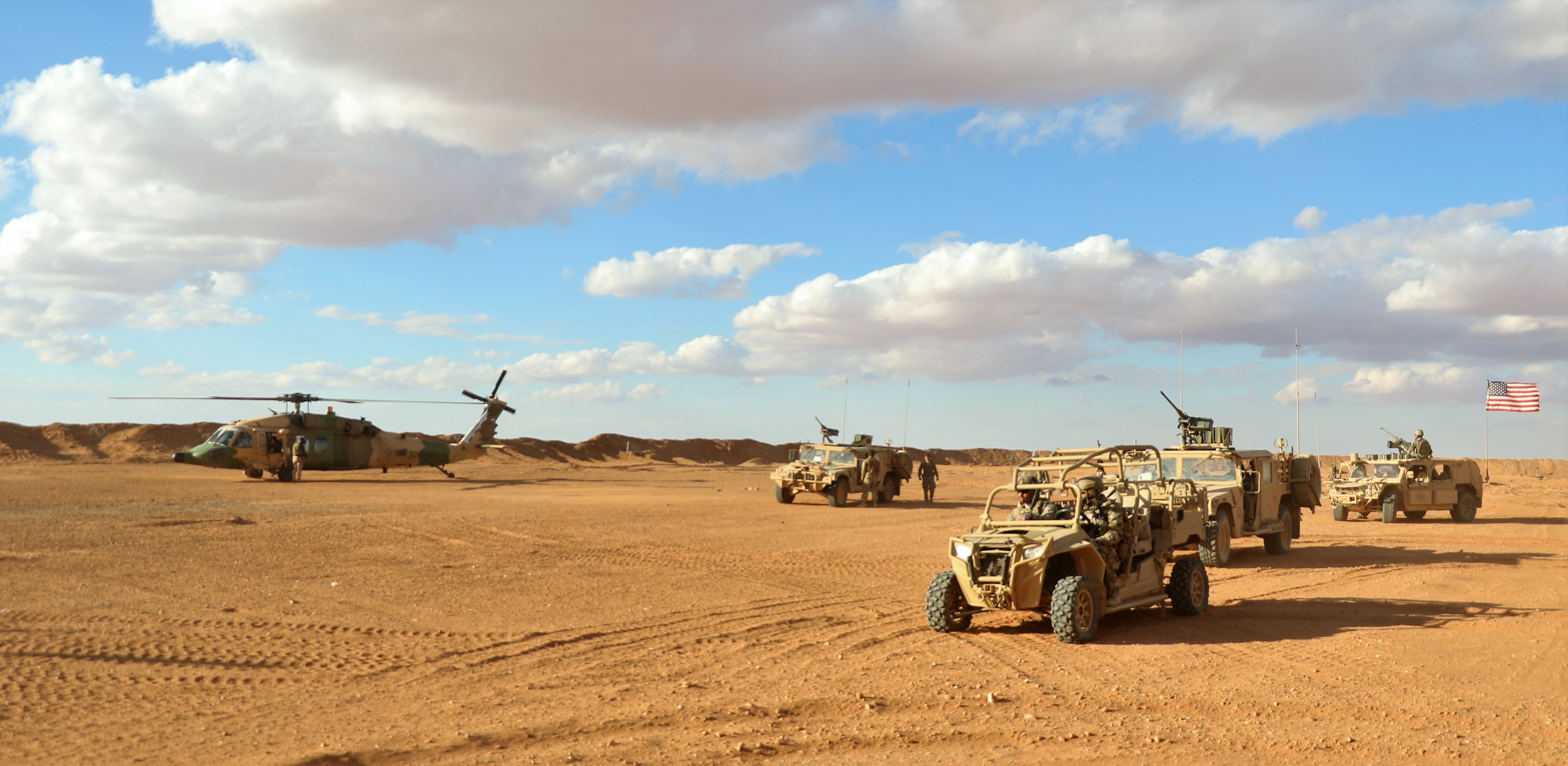
A landing zone in al-Tanf during the U.S. intervention in the Syrian civil war

The 2011 Arab Spring resulted in uprisings, revolutions, and civil wars across the Arab world, including Libya, Syria, and Yemen. In 2011, the U.S. and NATO intervened in Libya by launching an extensive bombardment campaign in support of anti-Gaddafi forces. There was also speculation in The Washington Post that President Barack Obama issued a covert action, discovering in March 2011 that Obama authorized the CIA to carry out a clandestine effort to provide arms and support to the Libyan opposition. Libyan leader Muammar Gaddafi was ultimately overthrown and killed. American activities in Libya resulted in the 2012 Benghazi attack.

Beginning around 2012, under the aegis of operation Timber Sycamore and other clandestine activities, CIA operatives and U.S. special operations troops trained and armed nearly 10,000 Syrian rebel fighters against Syrian president Bashar al-Assad at a cost of $1 billion a year until it was phased out in 2017 by the Trump administration. After over a decade of civil war, Bashar al-Assad was ultimately overthrown in December 2024 after a surprise rebel offensive. In December 2025, the U.S. launched new airstrikes after two U.S. troops and an interpreter were killed in an ambush near Palmyra.

2013–2014 saw the rise of the Islamic State of Iraq and the Levant (ISIL/ISIS) terror organization in the Middle East. In June 2014, during Operation Inherent Resolve, the U.S. re-intervened into Iraq and began airstrikes against ISIL there in response to prior gains by the terrorist group that threatened U.S. assets (including the U.S. embassy) and Iraqi government forces. This was followed by more airstrikes on ISIL in Syria in September 2014, where the U.S.-led coalition targeted ISIL positions throughout the country. Initial airstrikes involved fighters, bombers, and cruise missiles. The U.S. officially re-intervened in Libya in 2015 as part of Inherent Resolve.

In March 2015, President Obama declared that he had authorized U.S. forces to provide logistical and intelligence support to Saudi Arabia in their military intervention in Yemen, establishing a "Joint Planning Cell" with them. American and British forces participated in the blockade of Yemen. In 2024, in response to Houthi attacks on commercial and naval vessels during the Red Sea crisis, the UK and the Biden administration launched a new bombing campaign in Yemen, which was continued by the Donald Trump administration before arranging a bilateral ceasefire.

By 2017 the MV Ocean Trader, a discreet Special Warfare Support vessel operated by Military Sealift Command, was in operation. The Ocean Trader serves as a floating, mobile barracks and command center for U.S. special operations units abroad. The "mothership" increases their deployability range when called upon for missions and foreign interventions.

In March 2021, the Biden administration designated al-Shabaab in Mozambique as a terrorist organization and, at the request of the Mozambique government, intervened in the Cabo Delgado conflict. Army Special Forces were deployed in the country to train Mozambican marines.

During his first term, President Donald Trump was the first U.S. president in decades to not commit the military to new foreign campaigns, instead continuing wars and operations he inherited from his predecessors, including interventions in Iraq, Syria and Somalia. The Trump administration often used economic pressure against international adversaries such as Venezuela and the Islamic Republic of Iran. In 2019, tensions between the U.S. and Iran triggered a crisis in the Persian Gulf which saw the U.S. bolster its military presence in the region, the creation of the International Maritime Security Construct to combat attacks on commercial shipping, and the assassination of prominent Iranian general Qasem Soleimani.

== Trump Corollary ==
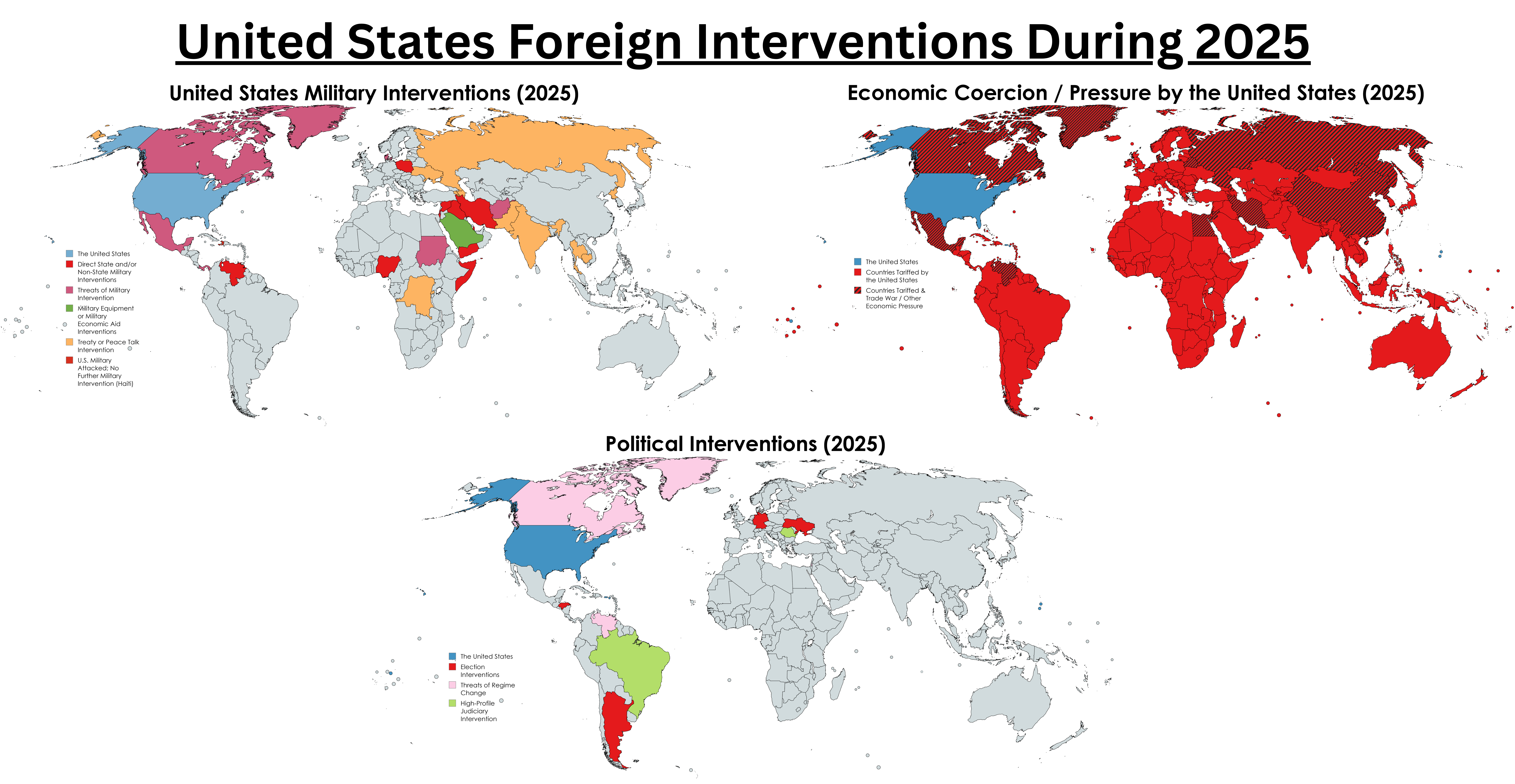
Foreign interventions by the United States during 2025

The second Trump administration introduced the Trump Corollary to the Monroe Doctrine, which aimed to "reassert and enforce the Monroe Doctrine to restore American pre-eminence in the Western Hemisphere." President Trump embraced an expansionist policy in the Western Hemisphere, openly threatening to annex Canada, Greenland, and the Panama Canal. In December 2025 the U.S. Army established the Western Hemisphere Command, uniting FORSCOM, ARNORTH and ARSOUTH under a unified headquarters overseeing operations across North America, Latin America, and the Caribbean. Joint Task Force Western Hemisphere was established in August 2026 to serve as a rapid reaction force across the Americas.

The 2025 National Security Strategy (NSS) and the 2026 National Defense Strategy generally renounced America's prior role in world policing and reoriented towards transactional alliances, regionalism and multipolar spheres of influence. The NSS maintained goals of containing Chinese adventurism and militarily reinforcing the First Island Chain. Diplomatically, the Trump administration played a role in mediating the 2025 India–Pakistan conflict alongside brokering and facilitating peace agreements between the DR Congo and Rwanda, Armenia and Azerbaijan, and Cambodia and Thailand. The Trump Route for International Peace and Prosperity was proposed along the Zangezur corridor, linking Azerbaijan to Nakhchivan in Armenia.

=== Latin America interventions ===
Trump intervened militarily, politically and economically in Latin America. In October 2025, he threatened to cut off financial aid to Argentina if incumbent president Javier Milei's party, La Libertad Avanza, lost the 2025 Argentine legislative election, an election the party would go on to win decisively. Trump attempted to influence the 2025 Honduran general election by publicly supporting Nasry Asfura of the National Party and warned that U.S. aid could be suspended if Asfura did not win; Asfura was declared the victor a month later. Trump's immigration policy overlapped with foreign policy, with Nayib Bukele's El Salvador and Luis Abinader's Dominican Republic cooperating with the U.S. in receiving third country deportees in their respective countries. Trump reportedly desired regime change in Cuba, tightening the fuel blockade and further isolating the country.

The Trump administration also revamped the war on drugs by cracking down on drug trafficking in Latin America and designating Mexican and South American cartels as foreign terrorist organizations, including Colombia's Clan del Golfo and Venezuela's Cartel of the Suns. The Shield of the Americas coalition was established, allowing participating governments to coordinate anti-cartel efforts. The U.S. Coast Guard launched Operation Pacific Viper to combat drug trafficking in the eastern Pacific Ocean, while Operation Southern Spear, a separate military campaign prioritizing the Caribbean Sea, reactivated the Roosevelt Roads Naval Station in Ceiba, Puerto Rico. The U.S. conducted airstrikes on alleged drug smuggling boats in the Caribbean and eastern Pacific, reportedly supported by intelligence provided by the CIA. The CIA reportedly escalated lethal covert operations (including car bombings) inside Mexico to weaken the cartels, though the CIA publicly denied these reports.

In March 2026 the U.S. and Ecuador launched joint operations against "narco-terrorist" groups, including Comandos de la Frontera. Guatemala requested U.S. military cooperation encompassing equipment, training, and experts to fight drug trafficking, but denied that it had authorized new U.S. military operations inside the country.

==== Venezuela intervention ====
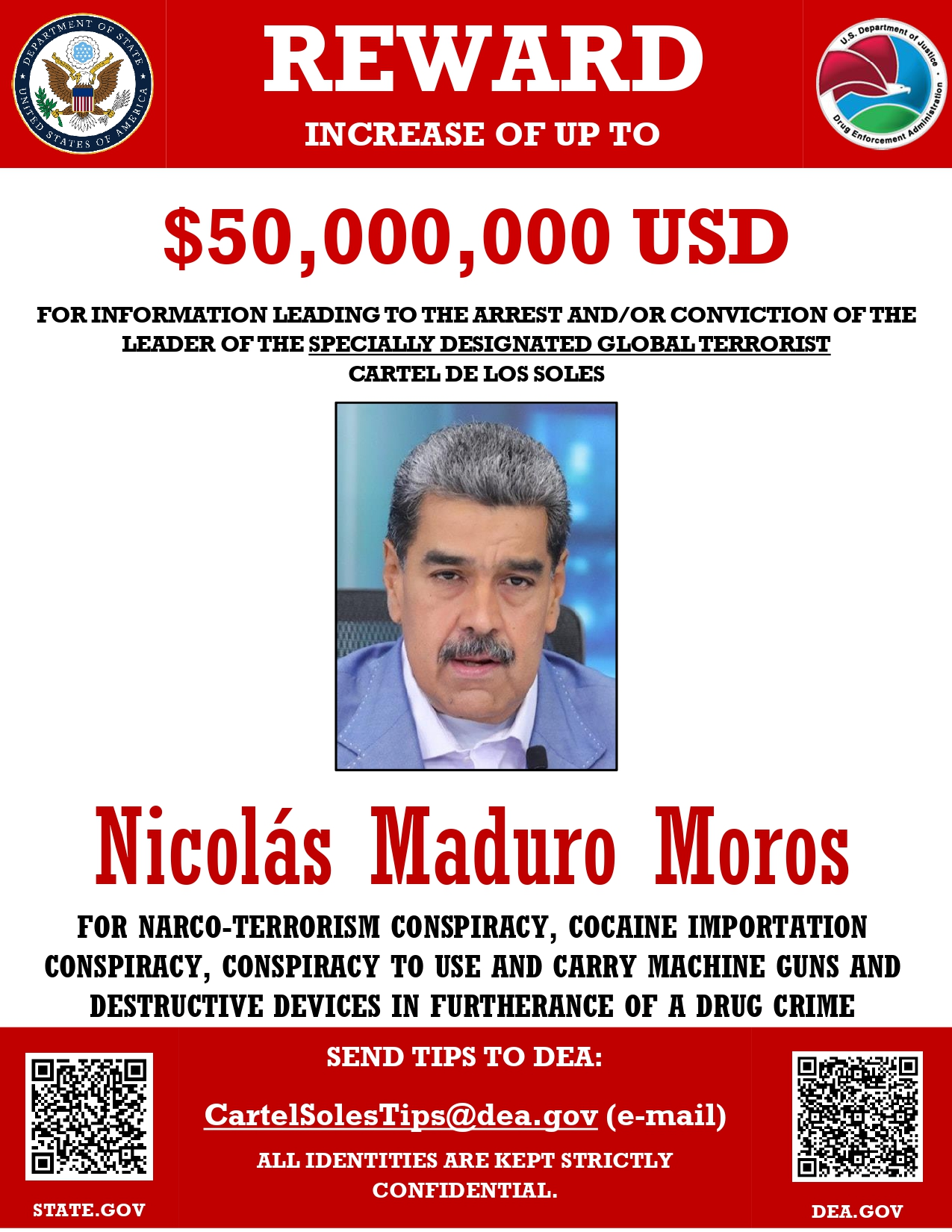
DEA poster with $50 million reward for Venezuelan president Nicolás Maduro. Maduro was captured by US forces during Operation Absolute Resolve.

Southern Spear facilitated a pressure campaign against Venezuelan president Nicolás Maduro's regime, with U.S. forces imposing a blockade on sanctioned oil tankers transiting to and from Venezuela, a strategy interpreted by some as a return of gunboat diplomacy. Trump authorized CIA activities inside Venezuela and increased the U.S. bounty on Maduro to $50 million, accusing him of narcoterrorism and cooperating with cartels. On January 3, 2026, U.S. forces captured Maduro and took him into custody, beginning a process to transform Maduro's decapitated regime into an American-friendly government, including transferring control of Venezuelan oil reserves and production to U.S. companies. The Trump administration reportedly sought to avoid adverse outcomes similar to those seen during de-Ba'athification in Iraq, choosing to instead cooperate with the remains of the Chavismo regime instead of uprooting it entirely.

Following the toppling of Maduro, Vice President Delcy Rodríguez assumed the presidency, and began a purge of Maduro-era loyalists. In just a few months, Rodríguez reshuffled roughly 40% of her cabinet, replacing 17 ministers and updating military leadership to install her own loyalists. Powerful Maduro loyalists, such as long-serving Defense Minister Vladimir Padrino López and Attorney General Tarek William Saab, were stripped of their posts. Lucrative government contracts granted to Maduro's son, Nicolás Maduro Guerra were canceled, and members of his extended family were sidelined to limit their influence. This consolidation was further highlighted when Venezuela's Minister of Industry and National Production, Alex Saab, was captured in February 2026 in a joint operation by American and Venezuelan intelligence agencies. In May 2026, he was deported to the U.S. Tren de Aragua leader Niño Guerrero was also killed in a joint Venezuelan-U.S. operation in June 2026.

Venezuelan-U.S. relations improved, with the U.S. embassy in Caracas reopening in March 2026 after previously closing in 2019 and the U.S. military providing disaster relief following the 2026 Venezuela earthquakes. Despite downplaying his own role, the New York Times labeled Secretary of State Marco Rubio the de facto "viceroy" of Venezuela, writing that he effectively controlled the country's finances, government policy direction, and natural resources as he held immense power over Delcy Rodriguez while mostly remaining in Washington, D.C. Rubio in Venezuela was likened to Paul Bremer, who effectively governed occupied Iraq from 2003 to 2004 under the Coalition Provisional Authority. Trump, however, said Energy Secretary Chris Wright was "running" Venezuela, referring to recent pro-American changes in its oil industry; Trump also expressed some interest in Venezuela becoming the 51st state.

=== 2025–2026 Iran conflict ===
Trump inherited a crisis in the Middle East and the ongoing Russian invasion of Ukraine. On June 22, 2025, Trump carried out airstrikes on Iranian nuclear facilities, coordinating with Israel amid the twelve-day Iran–Israel war. The strikes temporarily disrupted Iran’s nuclear activities and drew international attention, with the UN expressing alarm and calling for restraint. These strikes were carried out for the "defense of its Israeli ally", though the actual feasibility of the Iranian state acquiring a nuclear bomb capable of being a threat to Israel was contested. Furthermore, the US-Israeli-Iranian conflict which proceeded has been viewed as widely ineffective and unpopular, costing american taxpayers 2 billion a day to operate. On September 29, 2025, he unveiled a 20-point peace plan to resolve the Gaza War, parts of which called for an International Stabilization Force and Board of Peace.

== European Deterrence Initiative and Russo-Ukrainian War ==
In response to the 2014 Russian annexation of Crimea, the Obama administration established the European Deterrence Initiative (EDI), a program dedicated to bolstering American military presence in Central and Eastern Europe. The EDI has funded Operation Atlantic Resolve, a collective defense effort to enhance NATO's military planning and defense capabilities by maintaining a persistent rotation of American air, ground and naval presence in the region to deter perceived Russian aggression along NATO's eastern flank. The Enhanced Forward Presence (EFP) force was established by NATO.

=== Ukraine Security Assistance Initiative ===
In early November 2024, the Biden administration lifted a de facto ban on U.S. military contractors deploying to Ukraine to help the Ukrainian military repair and maintain U.S.-supplied weapons systems that require "specific technical expertise", such as F-16 fighter jets and Patriot air defense systems. Although various American companies already had personnel in Ukraine fulfilling contracts for the Ukrainian government, this new policy allowed the Pentagon to provide contracts to American companies for work inside Ukraine for the first time since Russia invaded in 2022. Pentagon officials emphasized the contractors will be located far from the front lines and will not engage Russian forces, and the policy change will result in a range of a few dozen to a few hundred contractors working inside Ukraine at a time. On 17 November 2024, Biden allowed Ukraine to launch U.S.-made long-range missiles deep into Russian territory.

=== Lettergate ===
It is alleged that the United States was involved in the 2022 vote of no confidence against former Pakistani Prime Minister Imran Khan. On 7 March 2022, Islamabad's then-ambassador to the U.S., Asad Majeed Khan met with two American officials, one of whom was Donald Lu, a United States diplomat serving as Assistant Secretary of State for South and Central Asian Affairs. In the meeting, Lu showed displeasure over Khan's visit to Russia one day before Russia's invasion of Ukraine. He stated that if the no-confidence vote were to be successful, "all would be forgiven", otherwise ".. it will be tough going ahead". It was only the next day, on 8 March 2022, that the Pakistan Democratic Movement announced that they were bringing a no-confidence motion against the then Premier. A cipher was sent to Khan with the details of the conversation between the officials. On 27 March 2022, Khan claimed that he possessed a diplomatic cable dated 7 March, in which a "threat" was issued by the US government stating their desire to see Khan's ousting from office, with the stipulation that Pakistan would be "forgiven" if the motion against him succeeded. The US was allegedly unhappy with Khan's foreign policy and his visit to Russia.

In August 2023, more than a year after Khan first made his claims, The Intercept published a leaked copy of the cable, which it claimed to have received from a disgruntled member of Pakistan's military. In the cable, Pakistan's ambassador to the United States reported that U.S. Assistant Secretary of State for Central and South Asia Donald Lu warned that the "isolation of the Prime Minister will become very strong from Europe and the United States" after Khan's visit to Russia, and that "if the no-confidence vote against the Prime Minister succeeds, all will be forgiven in Washington."

Khan alleged that the United States was behind a "foreign conspiracy" to oust him in a regime change, and that he had written evidence attesting to this. These allegations were denied by the US government. Imran Khan also said that he has been punished on not accepting U.S. policy after withdrawal from Afghanistan. Donald Lu evaded the question regarding his meeting with Pakistan's Ambassador to the U.S. Khan's party alleged that there is a close connection between regime changes after UN's Ukraine Resolution. Russian Ministry of Foreign Affairs Spokesperson Maria Zakharova said that the U.S. has punished disobedient Imran Khan and termed that interference a shameless act. However, the U.S. claims that there is "absolutely no truth" in the allegations.

== See also ==
- American imperialism
- American exceptionalism
- Territories of the United States § Former U.S. military occupations
- Territorial evolution of the United States
- United States and state terrorism
- Criticism of United States foreign policy
- Donroe Doctrine
- List of United States drone bases
- List of the lengths of United States participation in wars
- Military history of the United States
- Historic regions of the United States
- Neoconservatism
- Manifest Destiny
- Democracy promotion by the United States
- Foreign interventions by the Soviet Union
- Foreign interventions by China
- Foreign interventions by Cuba
- Foreign electoral intervention
- New Imperialism
- List of United States invasions of Latin American countries
- Attacks on the United States
