= List of the lengths of United States participation in wars =

This article contains the length and list of major conflicts, invasions and wars participated by the United States Armed Forces since its creation in 1775.

== Lengths of US combat forces' participation in wars ==
War in the context of this list is broadly construed to be a direct armed conflict between organized US military forces and organized forces of (a) belligerent(s).

(Note: Ongoing wars are indicated in bold and with red bars.)

Rank	War	Dates	Duration	Duration (graphical representation)
1	War in Afghanistan	2001 – 2021	19.9 years (19 years, 10 months)	
2	**US intervention in Somalia**	2007 – present	19.8 years (19 years, 9 months)	
3	Vietnam War	1955 – 1975 (Note: Direct US involvement ended in 1973 with the Paris Peace Accords)	19.4 years (19 years, 5 months)	
4	Occupation of Haiti	1915 – 1934	19 years	
5	**US intervention in Yemen**	2002, 2009 – present	16.8 years (16 years, 9 months)	
6	Philippine–American War and Moro Rebellion	1899 – 1913	14 years	
7	War in North-West Pakistan	2004 – 2017	13 years	
8	**War against the Islamic State**	2013 – present	13.5 years (13 years, 6 months)	
9	Operation Inherent Resolve	2014 – 2026	12.3 years (12 years, 4 months)	
10	US military intervention in Niger	2013 – 2024	11 years	
11	Northwest Indian War	1785 – 1795	10 years	
12	Iraq War	2003 – 2011	8.7 years (8 years, 9 months)	
13	American Revolutionary War	1775 – 1783	8.4 years (8 years, 5 months)	
14	Second Seminole War	1835 – 1842	6.7 years (6 years, 7 month)	
15	First Barbary War	1801 – 1805	4.1 years (4 years, 1 month)	
16	American Civil War	1861 – 1865	4.1 years	
17	World War II	1941 – 1945	3.7 years (3 years, 8 months)	
18	Korean War	1950 – 1953	3.1 years (3 years, 1 month)	
19	War of 1812	1812 – 1814	2.5 years (2 years, 6 months)	
20	Mexican–American War	1846 – 1848	1.8 years (1 year, 9 months)	
21	World War I	1917 – 1918	1.6 years (1 year, 7 months)	
22	Great Sioux War of 1876	1876 – 1877	1.2 years (1 year, 3 months)	
23	**2026 Iran War**	2026-02-28 – present	0.6 years (7.6 months)	
24	Gulf War	1990 – 1991 (Note: (33)The term "Persian Gulf War" means the period beginning on August 2, 1990, and ending on the date thereafter prescribed by Presidential proclamation or by law. 38 U.S.C. § 101)	0.6 years (7.2 months)	
25	Whiskey Rebellion	1794 – 1794	0.4 years (4.8 months)	
26	Spanish–American War	1898 – 1898	114 days	
27	Kosovo War	1999 – 1999	79 days	
28	Invasion of Panama	1989 – 1990	42 days	
29	Invasion of Grenada	1983-10-25 – 1983-10-29	4 (3.5) days	
30	Twelve-Day War	2025-06-22 – 2025-06-24	2 days	
31	Bay of Pigs Invasion	1962-04-19	1 day (Note: The Bay of Pigs invasion was conducted by Brigade 2506, a group of Cuban exiles recruited and equipped by the CIA as part of a covert operation, and trained by instructors from the CIA and US Army Special Forces, US Air Force, and Air National Guard. The botched invasion took three days: Americans were initially not authorized to participate in the invasion. However, on the last day of the failed operation (April 19, 1961), US air support was authorized, and eight Alabama Air National Guard members flew into Cuban airspace.)	
32	2026 United States intervention in Venezuela	2026-01-03	<1 day (2 hours 28 minutes)	

Sources are found in the main articles of each war, as well as the Associated Press.

== See also ==
- United States military deployments
- Foreign policy of the United States
- United States Department of Defense
- Declaration of war by the United States
- Military history of the United States
- Foreign interventions by the United States
- United States Armed Forces
- United States military casualties of war
- List of wars involving the United States
- List of conflicts by duration

== Bibliography ==
U.S. Department of Defense (DoD) (November 6, 1998). "Name of Technical Sergeant Richard B. Fitzgibbon to be added to the Vietnam Veterans Memorial". DoD. Archived from the original on August 28, 2015.
Lawrence, A. T. (2009). Crucible Vietnam: Memoir of an Infantry Lieutenant. Jefferson, North Carolina: McFarland. ISBN 978-0-786-44517-2.
