= Kennedy Doctrine =

U.S. foreign policy doctrine

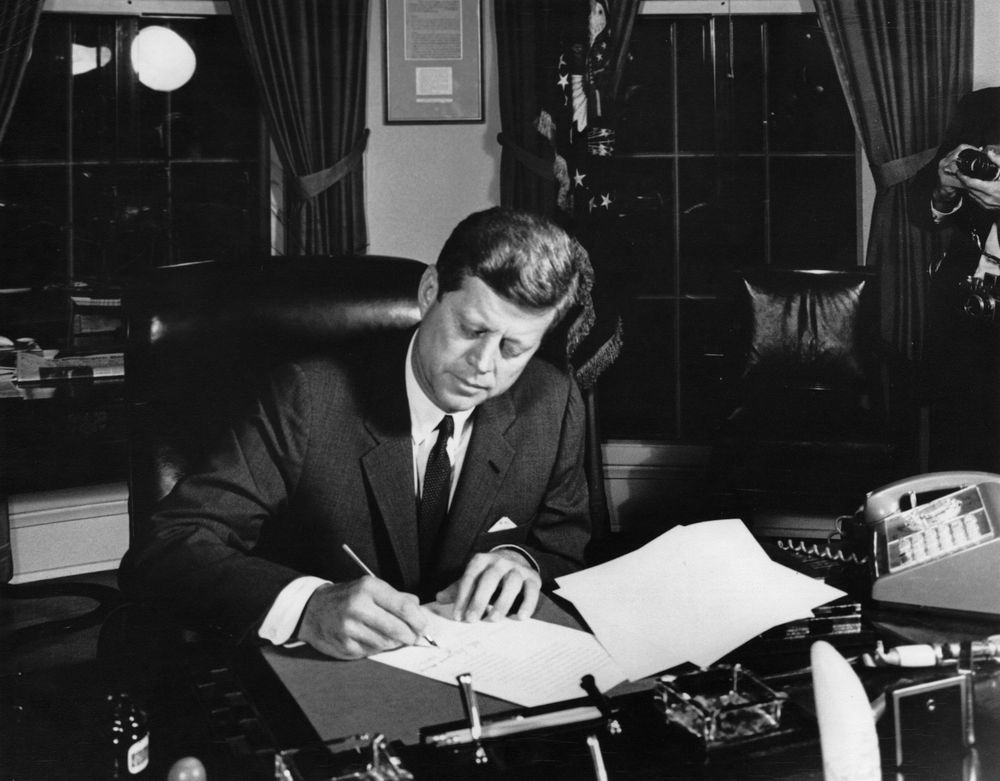
President John F. Kennedy signing Proclamation 3504, authorizing the naval quarantine of Cuba

The Kennedy Doctrine refers to foreign policy initiatives of the 35th President of the United States, John F. Kennedy, towards Latin America during his administration between 1961 and 1963. Kennedy voiced support for the containment of communism as well as the reversal of communist progress in the Western Hemisphere.

== Inaugural address: "Pay any price, bear any burden" ==
In his inaugural address on January 20, 1961, Kennedy presented the American public with a blueprint upon which the future foreign policy initiatives of his administration would later follow and come to represent. In the address, Kennedy warned "Let every nation know, whether it wishes us well or ill, that we shall pay any price, bear any burden, meet any hardship, support any friend, oppose any foe, in order to assure the survival and the success of liberty."^{1} He also called upon the public to assist in "a struggle against the common enemies of man: tyranny, poverty, disease, and war itself."^{1} The speech laid out clearly a vision of peace through strength and strength through international coalitions committed to the protection and expansion of the American ideals of Peace, Liberty, and Justice for all.

== Containment ==
A dominant premise during Kennedy's presidency was the need to contain communism at any cost. Kennedy's "call for military strength and unison in the struggle against communism were balanced with... [hopes] for disarmament and global cooperation."^{2} Another common theme in Kennedy's foreign policy was the belief that the U.S. had the ability and power to influence events in the international system for the better. Kennedy expressed this idea in his address when he stated, "In the long history of the world only a few generations have been granted the role of defending freedom from its hour of maximum danger. I do not shrink from this responsibility – I welcome it."^{1}

== Historical background ==
The Kennedy Doctrine was essentially an expansion of the foreign policy prerogatives of the administrations of Dwight D. Eisenhower and Harry S. Truman. The foreign policies of these presidents all revolved around the threat of communism and the means by which the U.S. would try containing the spread of it.

The Truman Doctrine focused on the containment of communism by providing assistance to countries resisting communism in Europe.

The Eisenhower Doctrine was focused upon providing both military and economic assistance to nations resisting communism in the Middle East, and by increasing the flow of trade from the U.S. into Latin America. The Kennedy Doctrine was based on these same objectives, but was more concerned with the spread of communism and Soviet influence in Latin America following the Cuban Revolution that brought Fidel Castro to power under Eisenhower.

== Alliance for Progress ==
In his inaugural address, Kennedy talked of an alliance for progress with countries in Latin America. In his Alliance for Progress address to Latin American diplomats and members of Congress on March 13, 1961, he expanded on his promises from his inaugural speech. "I have called on all the people of the hemisphere to join in a new Alliance for Progress – alianza para el Progreso – a vast cooperative effort, unparalleled in magnitude and nobility of purpose, to satisfy the basic needs of the American people for homes, work and land, health and schools – techo, trabajo y tierra, salud y escuela."^{3}

In the address, Kennedy reaffirmed the United States' pledge of coming to the defense of any nation whose independence was endangered, promised to increase the food-for-peace emergency program, and to provide economic aid to nations in need. He requested that Latin American countries promote social change within their borders and called upon all American nations to move towards increased economic integration. "To achieve this goal political freedom must accompany material progress. Our Alliance for Progress is an alliance of free governments – and it must work to eliminate tyranny from a hemisphere in which it has no rightful place. Therefore let us express our special friendship to the people of Cuba and the Dominican Republic – and the hope they will soon rejoin the society of free men, uniting with us in our common effort."^{3}

== Debate over the international role of the United States ==
Many have questioned whether Kennedy's inaugural address, and the foreign policy stemming from the vision he expressed in it "describes an appropriate, rational, and prudent role for the United States in the world; whether it is an outline for an era of negotiation and accommodation and friendship; or whether it is a prescription for an untenable globalism, leading inevitably to increased areas of conflict, to a heightening of the arms race, and to American concern with and involvement, to one degree or another, in the affairs of almost every country in the world."^{4}

What remains clear is that Kennedy was deeply involved and committed to every aspect of the foreign policy under his administration. W. Averell Harriman served in and on behalf of Kennedy's administration in several capacities, and noted, "President Kennedy was the first President, that I know of, who was really his own secretary of state. He dealt with every aspect of foreign policy, and he knew about everything that was going on."^{5}

== Derived events ==
Some of the most notable events that stemmed from tenets of Kennedy's foreign policy initiatives in regard to Latin America and the spread of communism were:^{6}

- the Bay of Pigs Invasion, April 17, 1961
- increase of U.S. involvement in the Vietnam War, 1962
- the Cuban Missile Crisis, October 1962
- ratification of the Partial Nuclear Test Ban Treaty, July 1963

== See also ==
- Flexible response

== Notes ==
1. Inaugural Address of John F. Kennedy at the Avalon Project at Yale Law School.
2. Viotti, Paul R, American Foreign Policy and National Security: A Documentary Record (Pearson Prentice Hall: 2005), 222.
3. Modern History Sourcebook. President John F. Kennedy: On the Alliance for Progress, 1961.
4. Fitzsimons, Louise. The Kennedy Doctrine (New York: Random House, 1972), 10.
5. The John F. Kennedy Presidential Oral History Collection.
6. Weidman, Lisa Menéndez. A Biography of John F. Kennedy: The 35th President of the United States.
