= Use of long-range weapons by Ukraine in Russia =

Ukraine has used long-range missiles into Russian territory. As of November 2024, the United States and NATO has supported Ukraine using long-range missiles to strike within Russia.

== Background ==
=== Domestic program ===
Ukraine has maintained a domestic long-range missile program prior to the Russian invasion in February 2022. The Ukrainian military deployed a long-range missile that was manufactured in the country in September 2023.

=== Initial use ===
In October 2023, Ukrainian forces began using APAM missiles against Russian forces. In March 2024, Politico reported that the U.S. was planning to send additional APAM missiles to Ukraine. The shipment included long-range ATACMS missiles.

== Use in Crimea ==
In May 2024, Ukraine used ATACMS missiles against a Russian communications center in Crimea.

== Weapons approval ==
The United States has debated granting Ukraine permission to use long-range weapons within Russia. U.S. officials do not believe that Ukraine has enough ATACMS and Storm Shadow missiles to alter the course of the war, according to The New York Times. In September 2024, U.S. president Joe Biden met with British prime minister Keir Starmer to discuss allowing Ukraine to use long-range weapons in Russia.

On 16 November 2024, Biden allowed Ukraine to use long-range missiles. Permission for the US ATACMS strikes are limited to Russian and North Korean forces in Kursk Oblast. According to Le Figaro, France and Britain have granted permission for Ukraine to use SCALP and Storm Shadow missiles on targets inside Russia. If the Storm Shadow missiles have similar restrictions as ATACMS is unclear.

On 18 November 2024, EU chief's diplomat Josep Borrell confirmed that the US has allowed strikes 300 kilometres into Russia, using weapons it supplied to Ukraine.

Ukraine fired several American-supplied longer-range missiles into Russia, officials said on 19 November 2024, marking the first time Kyiv used the weapons that way in 1,000 days of war.
