= Operation Enduring Freedom – Caribbean and Central America =

US-led regional military operation

Operation Enduring Freedom – Caribbean and Central America (OEF-CCA) is the name of a U.S.-led regional military operation initiated in 2008, under the control of United States Southern Command. It has a focus on counter-terrorism and is part of the larger Operation Enduring Freedom which was begun in a response to the terrorist attacks of 9/11.

In Fiscal Year 2009, elements of the 7th Special Forces Group were deployed to eight Central and South American nations: Belize, El Salvador, Nicaragua, Costa Rica, Honduras, Trinidad and Tobago, Guyana, and Suriname.

In 2008, a $13.8 million Counter-Terrorist Unit Train and Equip budget was allocated to Belize, Honduras, Guyana and Suriname. An additional $12.9 million Counterterrorism Capabilities budget was allocated to Mexico.

== Congressional Research Service Report ==
According to a Congressional Research Service report published in February 2011, "In its 2009 Country Reports on Terrorism (issued in August 2010), the State Department maintained that terrorism in the region was primarily perpetrated by terrorist organizations in Colombia and by the remnants of radical leftist Andean groups. Overall, however, the report maintained that the threat of a transnational terrorist attack remained low for most countries in the hemisphere." The report concluded, "The State Department maintains that there are no known operation cells of either Al Qaeda or Hezbollah-related groups in the hemisphere, although it notes that ideological sympathizers continue to provide financial and moral support to these and other terrorist groups in the Middle East and South Asia."
