= List of doctrines named after people =

Eponymous doctrines are doctrines named after people. Those listed below include financial, economic, legal, political, military, and religious doctrines.

== Financial and economic doctrines ==
- Bernanke doctrine, named after Ben Bernanke
- Friedman doctrine, named after Milton Friedman

== Legal doctrines ==
Most legal doctrines are named after cases. This section only includes doctrines named after the judges who formulated them.

== Political and military doctrines ==
=== Argentinian doctrines ===
- Calvo Doctrine, named after Carlos Calvo (historian)
- Drago Doctrine, named after Luis María Drago

=== Belgian doctrines ===
- Harmel Doctrine, named after Pierre Harmel
- Maddens Doctrine, named after Bart Maddens

=== Chilean doctrines ===
- Schneider Doctrine, named after René Schneider

=== Danish doctrines ===
- Ellemann-Jensen doctrine, named after Uffe Ellemann-Jensen

=== Finnish doctrines ===
- Paasikivi–Kekkonen Line, named after Finland's consecutive presidents Juho Kusti Paasikivi and Urho Kekkonen.

=== French doctrines ===
- Mitterrand doctrine

=== German doctrines ===
- Hallstein Doctrine also known as Hallstein–Grewe Doctrine,, named after Walter Hallstein and Wilhelm Grewe
- Ulbricht Doctrine, named after Walter Ulbricht

=== Indian doctrines ===
- Gujral Doctrine, named after I. K. Gujral

=== Iranian doctrines ===
- Fadavi Doctrine, named after Ali Fadavi

=== Israeli doctrines ===
- Begin Doctrine, named after Menachem Begin

=== Japanese doctrines ===
- Fukuda Doctrine, named after Takeo Fukuda
- Taika Reform, named after Emperor Kōtoku who took the name "Taika"
- Yoshida Doctrine, named after Shigeru Yoshida

=== Korean doctrines ===
- MB Doctrine, named after Lee Myung-bak

=== Mexican doctrines ===
- Castañeda Doctrine, named after Jorge G. Castañeda
- Estrada Doctrine, named after Genaro Estrada

=== Russian/Soviet doctrines ===
- Brezhnev Doctrine, named after Leonid Brezhnev
- Sinatra Doctrine, named by Gennadi Gerasimov after Frank Sinatra
- Zhdanov Doctrine, named after Andrei Zhdanov

=== UK doctrines ===
- Wilson Doctrine, named after Harold Wilson

=== US doctrines ===
- Bush Doctrine, named after George W. Bush
- Carter Doctrine
- Clark Memorandum, named after J. Reuben Clark
- Clinton Doctrine
- Eisenhower Doctrine
- Hillary Doctrine, named after Hillary Clinton
- Johnson Doctrine
- Kennedy Doctrine
- Kirkpatrick Doctrine
- Monroe Doctrine, named after James Monroe
- Negroponte doctrine, named after John Negroponte
- Nixon Doctrine
- Obama Doctrine, named after Barack Obama
- Powell Doctrine, named after Colin Powell
- Reagan Doctrine, named after Ronald Reagan
- Roosevelt Corollary, named after Theodore Roosevelt
- Rumsfeld Doctrine, named after Donald Rumsfeld
- Schlesinger Doctrine, named after James Schlesinger
- Stimson Doctrine, named after Henry L. Stimson
- Truman Doctrine
- Weinberger Doctrine, named after Caspar Weinberger
- Wolfowitz Doctrine, named after Paul Wolfowitz

=== Yugoslav doctrines ===
- Titoism, named after Josip Broz Tito

== Religious doctrines ==
- Armstrongism, named after Herbert W. Armstrong
- Doctrine of Addai, named after Thaddeus of Edessa known as Saint Addai
- Doctrine of Calvin, named after John Calvin
- Doctrine of Father Divine
- Doctrines of Meister Eckhart
- Molinism, named after Luis de Molina
- Nestorian doctrine, named after Nestorius
- Priscillianism, named after Priscillian
- Socinianism, named after Fausto Sozzini
- Wahhabism, named after Muhammad ibn Abd al-Wahhab

== Fictional doctrines ==
- Dulles Doctrine, attributed to Allen Dulles
