= Foreign policy doctrine =

A foreign policy doctrine is a general statement of a country's foreign policy and the belief system that inform it and guide its strategy. It may be presented in the form of a political speech, doctrine or other official document.

The purpose of a foreign policy doctrine is to provide general rules for the conduct of foreign policy through decisions on international relations. These rules allow the political leadership of a nation to deal with a situation and to explain the actions of a nation to other nations. “Doctrine” is usually not meant to have any negative connotations; it is especially not to be confused with “dogma.”

In some cases, the statement is made by a political leader, typically a nation’s chief executive or chief diplomat, and comes to be named after that leader. Richard Nixon’s justification for the phased withdrawal of the United States from the Vietnam War, for example, came to be called the Nixon Doctrine. This pattern of naming is not universal, however; Chinese doctrines, for example, are often referred to by number.

== Argentina ==
- Calvo Doctrine
- Drago Doctrine

== Denmark ==
- Ellemann-Jensen doctrine

== Germany ==
- Hallstein Doctrine
- Ulbricht Doctrine

== Finland ==
- Paasikivi–Kekkonen doctrine

== India ==
- Gujral Doctrine

== Japan ==
- Fukuda Doctrine
- Yoshida Doctrine

== Mexico ==
- Estrada Doctrine
- Castañeda Doctrine

== Poland ==
- Giedroyc Doctrine
- Intermarium

== Russia / Soviet Union ==
- Brezhnev Doctrine
- Gerasimov Doctrine
- Karaganov Doctrine
- Falin-Kvitsinsky Doctrine
- Primakov Doctrine
- Sinatra Doctrine

== United States ==
- 1823: Monroe Doctrine
- 1842: Tyler Doctrine
- 1900: Roosevelt Doctrine
- 1932: Stimson Doctrine
- 1947: Truman Doctrine
- 1957: Eisenhower Doctrine
- 1961: Kennedy Doctrine
- 1965: Johnson Doctrine
- 1969: Nixon Doctrine
- 1980: Carter Doctrine
- 1981: Kirkpatrick Doctrine
- 1984: Weinberger Doctrine
- 1985: Reagan Doctrine
- 1990: Powell Doctrine
- 1999: Clinton Doctrine
- 2002: Bush Doctrine
- 2002: Rumsfeld Doctrine
- 2016: Obama Doctrine

== See also ==
- Military doctrine
