= United States presidential doctrines =

A United States presidential doctrine comprises the key goals, attitudes, or stances for United States foreign affairs outlined by a president. Most presidential doctrines are related to the Cold War. Though many U.S. presidents had themes related to their handling of foreign policy, the term doctrine generally applies to presidents such as James Monroe, Harry S. Truman, Richard Nixon, Jimmy Carter, and Ronald Reagan, all of whom had doctrines which more completely characterized their foreign policy.

== Monroe Doctrine ==
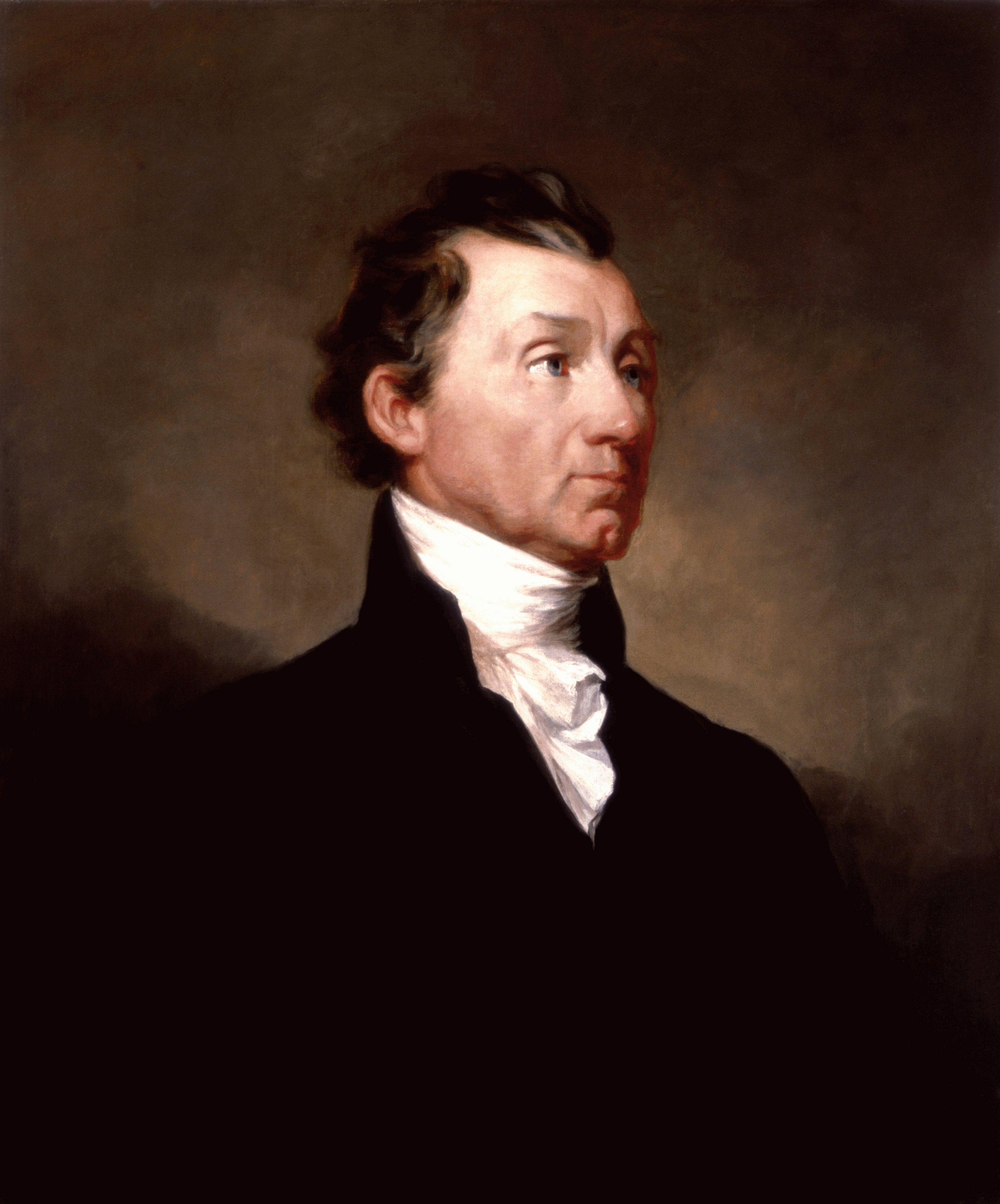
James Monroe

The Monroe Doctrine, expressed in 1823, proclaimed the United States' opinion that European powers should no longer colonize the Americas or interfere with the affairs of sovereign nations located in the Americas, such as the United States, Mexico, Gran Colombia, and others. In return, the United States planned to stay neutral in wars between European powers and in wars between a European power and its colonies. However, if these latter type of wars were to occur in the Americas, the U.S. would view such action as hostile toward itself.

The doctrine was issued by President James Monroe during this seventh annual State of the Union address to Congress. The doctrine was originally declared by its authors, including John Quincy Adams, to be a proclamation by the United States of its opposition to colonialism. However, since 1923, the doctrine has been re-interpreted in a variety of ways, including by President Theodore Roosevelt as justification U.S. to practice its own form of colonialism in South America, which is known as the Roosevelt Corollary to the Monroe Doctrine.

=== Roosevelt Corollary ===
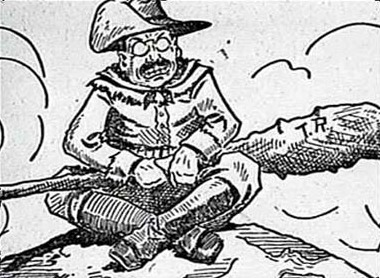
A political cartoonists' commentary on Roosevelt's "big stick" policy

The Roosevelt Corollary to the Monroe Doctrine was a substantial alteration (called an "amendment") of the Monroe Doctrine by President Theodore Roosevelt in 1904. In its altered state, the Monroe Doctrine would now consider Latin America as an agency for expanding U.S. commercial interests in the region, along with its original stated purpose of keeping European hegemony from the hemisphere.

In essence, Roosevelt's Monroe Doctrine would be the basis for a use of economic and military hegemony to make the U.S. the dominant power in the Western Hemisphere. The new doctrine was a frank statement that the U.S. was willing to seek leverage over Latin American governments by acting as an international police power in the region. This announcement has been described as the policy of "speaking softly but carrying a big stick", and consequently launched a period of "big stick" diplomacy, in contrast with the later Dollar diplomacy. Roosevelt's approach was more controversial among isolationist-pacifists in the U.S.

== Cold War doctrines ==
=== Truman Doctrine ===
The 1947 Truman Doctrine was part of the United States' political response to perceived aggression by the Soviet Union in Europe and the Middle East, illustrated through the communist movements in Iran, Turkey, and Greece. As a result, U.S. foreign policy towards the USSR shifted, as George F. Kennan phrased it, to that of containment. Under the Truman Doctrine, the United States was prepared to send any money, equipment, or military force to countries that were threatened by the communist government, thereby offering assistance to those countries resisting communism. In President Harry S. Truman's words, it became "the policy of the United States to support free peoples who are resisting attempted subjugation by armed minorities or by outside pressures".

Truman made the proclamation in an address to Congress on March 12, 1947, amid the crisis of the Greek Civil War (1946–1949). Truman insisted that if Greece and Turkey did not receive the aid that they needed, they would inevitably fall to communism with consequences throughout the region.

Truman signed the act into law on May 22, 1947, which granted $400 million in military and economic aid to Turkey and Greece. However, this American aid was in many ways a replacement for British aid which the British were no longer financially in a position to give. The policy of containment and opposition to communists in Greece for example was carried out by the British before 1947 in many of the same ways it was carried out afterward by the Americans.

The doctrine also had consequences elsewhere in Europe. Governments in Western Europe with powerful communist movements, such as Italy and France, were given a variety of assistance and encouraged to keep communist groups out of government. In some respects, these moves were in response to moves by the Soviet Union to purge opposition groups in Eastern Europe out of existence.

=== Eisenhower Doctrine ===
The Eisenhower Doctrine was announced by President Dwight D. Eisenhower in a message to Congress on January 5, 1957. Under the Eisenhower Doctrine, a country could request American economic assistance and/or aid from U.S. military forces if it was being threatened by armed aggression from another state. Eisenhower singled out the Soviet threat in his doctrine by authorizing the commitment of U.S. forces "to secure and protect the territorial integrity and political independence of such nations, requesting such aid against overt armed aggression from any nation controlled by international communism". The doctrine was motivated in part by an increase in Arab hostility toward the West, and growing Soviet influence in Egypt and Syria following the Suez Crisis of 1956.

In the global political context, the Eisenhower Doctrine was made in response to the possibility of a generalized war, threatened as a result of the Soviet Union's attempt to use the Suez War as a pretext to enter Egypt. Coupled with the power vacuum left by the decline of British and French power in the region after their failure in that same war, Eisenhower felt that a strong position needed to better the situation was further complicated by the positions taken by Egypt's Gamal Abdul Nasser, who was rapidly building a power base and using it to play the Soviets and Americans against each other, taking a position of "positive neutrality" and accepting aid from the Soviets.

The military action provisions of the doctrine were applied in the Lebanon crisis the following year, when the U.S. intervened in response to a request by that country's president.

=== Kennedy Doctrine ===
The Kennedy Doctrine refers to foreign policy initiatives of President John F. Kennedy, towards Latin America during his term in office. Kennedy voiced support for the containment of communism and the reversal of communist progress in the Western Hemisphere.

In his inaugural address on January 20, 1961, Kennedy presented the American public with a blueprint upon which the future foreign policy initiatives of his administration would later follow and come to represent. In this address, Kennedy warned "Let every nation know, whether it wishes us well or ill, that we shall pay any price, bear any burden, meet any hardship, support any friend, oppose any foe, in order to assure the survival and the success of liberty." He also called upon the public to assist in "a struggle against the common enemies of man: tyranny, poverty, disease, and war itself". It is in this address that one begins to see the Cold War, us-versus-them mentality that came to dominate the Kennedy administration.

=== Johnson Doctrine ===
The Johnson Doctrine, enunciated by President Lyndon B. Johnson after the United States' intervention in the Dominican Republic in 1965, declared that domestic revolution in the Western Hemisphere would no longer be a local matter when "the object is the establishment of a communist dictatorship".

=== Nixon Doctrine ===
The Nixon Doctrine was put forth in a press conference in Guam on July 25, 1969, by President Richard Nixon. He stated that the United States henceforth expected its allies to assume primary responsibility for their own military defense. This was the start of the "Vietnamization" of the Vietnam War. The doctrine argued for the pursuit of peace through a partnership with U.S. allies.

In Nixon's own words (Address to the Nation on the War in Vietnam November 3, 1969)

- First, the United States will keep all of its treaty commitments.
- Second, we shall provide a shield if a nuclear power threatens the freedom of a nation allied with us or of a nation whose survival we consider vital to our security.
- Third, in cases involving other types of aggression, we shall furnish military and economic assistance when requested in accordance with our treaty commitments. But we shall look to the nation directly threatened to assume the primary responsibility of providing the manpower for its defense.

The doctrine was also applied by the Nixon administration in the Persian Gulf region, with military aid to Iran and Saudi Arabia, so that these U.S. allies could undertake the responsibility of ensuring peace and stability in the region. According to Michael Klare, author of Blood and Oil: The Dangers and Consequences of America's Growing Petroleum Dependency (New York: Henry Holt, 2004), application of the Nixon Doctrine "opened the floodgates" of U.S. military aid to allies in the Persian Gulf, and helped set the stage for the Carter Doctrine and for the subsequent direct U.S. military involvement of the Gulf War and the Iraq War.

=== Carter Doctrine ===
The Carter Doctrine was a policy proclaimed by President Jimmy Carter in his State of the Union Address on January 23, 1980, which stated that the United States would use military force if necessary to defend its national interests in the Persian Gulf region. The doctrine was a response to the 1979 invasion of Afghanistan by the Soviet Union, and was intended to deter the Soviet Union—the Cold War adversary of the United States—from seeking hegemony in the Persian Gulf. After stating that Soviet troops in Afghanistan posed "a grave threat to the free movement of Middle East oil", Carter proclaimed:

Let our position be absolutely clear: An attempt by any outside force to gain control of the Persian Gulf region will be regarded as an assault on the vital interests of the United States of America, and such an assault will be repelled by any means necessary, including military force. (full speech)

This, the key sentence of the Carter Doctrine, was written by Zbigniew Brzezinski, Carter's National Security Adviser. Brzezinski modeled the wording of the Carter Doctrine on the Truman Doctrine, and insisted that the sentence be included in the speech "to make it very clear that the Soviets should stay away from the Persian Gulf".

In The Prize: The Epic Quest for Oil, Money, and Power, author Daniel Yergin notes that the Carter Doctrine "bore striking similarities" to a 1903 British declaration, in which British Foreign Secretary Lord Landsdowne warned Russia and Germany that the British would "regard the establishment of a naval base or of a fortified port in the Persian Gulf by any other power as a very grave menace to British interests, and we should certainly resist it with all the means at our disposal".

=== Reagan Doctrine ===
The Reagan Doctrine was an important Cold War strategy by the United States to oppose the influence of the Soviet Union by backing anti-communist guerrillas against the communist governments of Soviet-backed client states. It was created partially in response to the Brezhnev Doctrine and was a centerpiece of U.S. foreign policy from the mid-1980s until the end of the Cold War in 1991.

==== Reagan's definition ====
President Ronald Reagan first explained the doctrine in his 1985 State of the Union Address: "We must not break faith with those who are risking their lives...on every continent, from Afghanistan to Nicaragua ... to defy Soviet aggression and secure rights which have been ours from birth. Support for freedom fighters is self-defense."

The Reagan doctrine called for U.S. support of the Contras in Nicaragua, the Mujahideen in Afghanistan, and Jonas Savimbi's UNITA movement in Angola, among other anti-communist groups.

== Post-Cold War doctrines ==
=== Clinton Doctrine ===
The Clinton Doctrine is not a clear statement in the way that many other doctrines were. However, in a February 26, 1999, speech, President Bill Clinton said the following, which was considered the Clinton Doctrine:

It's easy ... to say that we really have no interests in who lives in this or that valley in Bosnia, or who owns a strip of brushland in the Horn of Africa, or some piece of parched earth by the Jordan River. But the true measure of our interests lies not in how small or distant these places are, or in whether we have trouble pronouncing their names. The question we must ask is, what are the consequences to our security of letting conflicts fester and spread. We cannot, indeed, we should not, do everything or be everywhere. But where our values and our interests are at stake, and where we can make a difference, we must be prepared to do so.

Later statements "genocide is in and of itself a national interest where we should act," and "we can say to the people of the world, whether you live in Africa, or Central Europe, or any other place, if somebody comes after innocent civilians and tries to kill them en masse because of their race, their ethnic background or their religion, and it's within our power to stop it, we will stop it," augmented the doctrine of interventionism. However, a lack of leadership within the Clinton administration led to the United States' failure to properly intervene in the Rwandan genocide, despite this ideology.

=== Bush Doctrine ===
The Bush Doctrine is the set of foreign policies adopted by President George W. Bush in the wake of the September 11, 2001 attacks. In an address to Congress after the attacks, Bush declared that the U.S. would "make no distinction between the terrorists who committed these acts and those who harbor them", a statement that was followed by the U.S. invasion of Afghanistan. Subsequently, the Bush Doctrine has come to be identified with a policy that permits preventive war against potential aggressors before they are capable of mounting attacks against the United States, a view that has been used in part as a rationale for the Iraq War. The Bush Doctrine is a marked departure from the policies of deterrence that generally characterized American foreign policy during the Cold War and brief period between the collapse of the Soviet Union and 9/11, and can also be contrasted with the Kirkpatrick Doctrine of supporting stable right-wing dictatorships that was influential during the Reagan administration.

=== Obama Doctrine ===
The Obama Doctrine is yet to be fully defined, and President Barack Obama himself has expressed a dislike for an overly "doctrinaire" approach to foreign policy. When asked about his doctrine, Obama has replied that the U.S. would have to "view our security in terms of a common security and a common prosperity with other peoples and other countries". On April 16, 2009, E. J. Dionne wrote a column for The Washington Post defining the doctrine as "a form of realism unafraid to deploy American power but mindful that its use must be tempered by practical limits and a dose of self-awareness". The Obama Doctrine has been praised by some as a welcome change from the dogmatic and aggressive Bush Doctrine. Others, such as Bush appointee and former United States Ambassador to the United Nations John Bolton, have criticized it as overly idealistic and naïve, promoting appeasement with the country's enemies.

=== Trump Doctrine ===
The Trump Doctrine is defined as the Trump administration's foreign policy, based upon the slogan of "America first." It leverages the United States' economic and military power to increase and decrease tensions favorably for America. President Donald Trump was especially critical of so-called "free riders," or countries which the U.S. uses resources to protect without receiving benefits in return. Through his foreign policy, Trump criticized the use of U.S. military forces in situations where national interests were uninvolved.

=== Biden Doctrine ===
Although the Biden Doctrine is not explicitly defined, President Joe Biden's foreign policy has been characterized by an avoidance of aggressive tactics that involve personnel in foreign nations. As a means of moving away from the Trump Doctrine's policy of "America first," Biden stated that, "The transatlantic alliance is back. The US is determined to consult with you." The Biden Doctrine is a shift away from foreign conflicts in an effort to focus resources on domestic issues. Following the United States' withdrawal of troops from Afghanistan, Biden defended the decision as furthering the administration's efforts to reduce risk to American lives and resources in foreign affairs.

== See also ==
- Powell Doctrine, drafted by then-Chairman of the Joint Chiefs of Staff Colin Powell
- America First
- International relations theory
