= Roosevelt Doctrine =

Roosevelt Doctrine may refer to:

- Big stick ideology, a political approach used by Theodore Roosevelt
- Roosevelt Corollary, an addition to the Monroe Doctrine articulated by Theodore Roosevelt

== See also ==
- Foreign policy of the Franklin D. Roosevelt administration
- Foreign policy of the Theodore Roosevelt administration
- United States presidential doctrines
