= Bush Doctrine =

Foreign policy principles of U.S. president George W. Bush

- 2001–2009
Clinton Doctrine	Donroe Doctrine
- Location: Global (primarily United States, Afghanistan, and Iraq)
- Including: Regime change (extending traditional U.S. hegemony into the Middle East to depose hostile regimes and actively spread democratic governance, expanding beyond the containment limits of the Monroe Doctrine)
- President: George W. Bush
- Key events: September 11 attacks (2001); Invasion of Afghanistan (2001); "Axis of evil" speech (2002); Invasion of Iraq (2003)

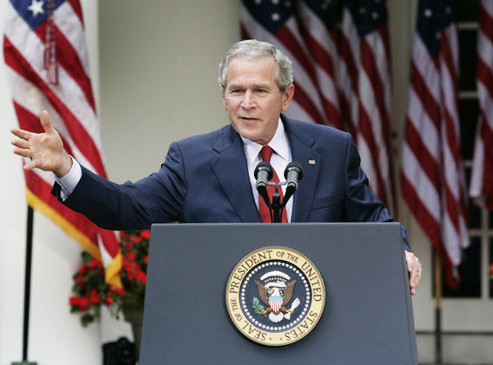
President Bush making remarks in 2006 during a press conference in the Rose Garden about Iran's nuclear ambitions and discussing North Korea's nuclear test

The Bush Doctrine refers to a set of interrelated foreign policy principles of the 43rd president of the United States, George W. Bush. These principles include unilateralism, the option of preemptive war, and the promotion of regime change. Some elements of these principles had antecedents in the 1992 Defense Planning Guidance.

Charles Krauthammer first used the phrase in June 2001, to describe the Bush administration's "unilaterally withdrawing from the ABM treaty and rejecting the Kyoto protocol." After the September 11 attacks, the phrase described the policy that the U.S. had the right to secure itself against countries that harbor or give aid to terrorist groups, which was used to justify the 2001 invasion of Afghanistan. The Bush Doctrine became strongly associated with the Bush administration's decision to invade Iraq in 2003.

Different pundits have attributed different meanings to the Bush Doctrine. It was used to describe specific policy elements, including a strategy of "preemptive strikes" as a defense against an immediate or perceived future threat to the security of the United States. This policy principle was applied particularly in the Middle East to counter international terrorist organizations and to justify the invasion of Iraq.

Generally, the Bush Doctrine was used to indicate a willingness to unilaterally pursue U.S. political influence. Some of these policies were codified in a National Security Council text entitled the National Security Strategy of the United States published on September 20, 2002.

The phrase "Bush Doctrine" was rarely used by members of the Bush administration. The expression was used at least once, though, by Vice President Dick Cheney, in a June 2003 speech in which he said, "If there is anyone in the world today who doubts the seriousness of the Bush Doctrine, I would urge that person to consider the fate of the Taliban in Afghanistan, and of Saddam Hussein's regime in Iraq."

== National Security Strategy of the United States ==
The main elements of the Bush Doctrine were delineated in a document, the National Security Strategy of the United States, published on September 17, 2002. This document is often cited as the definitive statement of the doctrine. As updated in 2006, it states:

The security environment confronting the United States today is radically different from what we have faced before. Yet the first duty of the United States Government remains what it always has been: to protect the American people and American interests. It is an enduring American principle that this duty obligates the government to anticipate and counter threats, using all elements of national power, before the threats can do grave damage. The greater the threat, the greater is the risk of inaction – and the more compelling the case for taking anticipatory action to defend ourselves, even if uncertainty remains as to the time and place of the enemy's attack. There are few greater threats than a terrorist attack with WMD. To forestall or prevent such hostile acts by our adversaries, the United States will, if necessary, act preemptively in exercising our inherent right of self-defense. The United States will not resort to force in all cases to preempt emerging threats. Our preference is that nonmilitary actions succeed. And no country should ever use preemption as a pretext for aggression.

== Components ==
The Bush Doctrine is defined as "a collection of strategy principles, practical policy decisions, and a set of rationales and ideas for guiding United States foreign policy." Some of these had reemerged from the 1992 draft Wolfowitz Doctrine, which had been leaked and disavowed by the first Bush administration; Paul Wolfowitz, as deputy secretary of defense, was at the center of the new Bush administration's strategic planning. Two main pillars are identified for the doctrine: 1.) preemptive strikes against potential enemies and 2.) promoting democratic regime change.

The Bush administration claimed that the U.S. was locked in a global war; a war of ideology, in which its enemies are bound together by a common ideology and a common hatred of democracy.

Out of the National Security Strategy, four main points are highlighted as the core to the Bush Doctrine: 1.) Preemption, 2.) Military Primacy, 3.) New Multilateralism, and 4.) the Spread of Democracy. The document emphasized preemption, stating, "America is now threatened less by conquering states than we are by failing ones. We are menaced less by fleets and armies than by catastrophic technologies in the hands of the embittered few", and required "defending the United States, the American people, and our interests at home and abroad by identifying and destroying the threat before it reaches our borders."

Secretary of Defense Donald Rumsfeld remarked thus in 2006, in a statement taken to reflect his view of the doctrine's efficacy: "If I were rating, I would say we probably deserve a D or D+ as a country as how well we're doing in the battle of ideas that's taking place. I'm not going to suggest that it's easy, but we have not found the formula as a country."

In his 2010 memoir Decision Points, Bush articulates his discrete concept of the Bush Doctrine. He stated that his doctrine consisted of four "prongs", three of them practical, and one idealistic. They are the following: (in his words)

1. "Make no distinction between terrorists and the nations that harbor them — and hold both to account."
2. "Take the fight to the enemy overseas before they can attack us again here at home."
3. "Confront threats before they fully materialize."
4. "Advance liberty and hope as an alternative to the enemy's ideology of repression and fear."

=== Unilateralism ===
Unilateral elements were evident early in Bush's presidency. Krauthammer, who coined the term "Bush Doctrine", deployed "unilateralism", in February 2001 to refer to Bush's increased unilateralism in foreign policy, specifically regarding his decision to withdraw from the ABM treaty.

There is some evidence that Bush's willingness for the U.S. to act unilaterally came even earlier. The International Journal of Peace Studies 2003 article "The Bush administration's image of Europe: From ambivalence to rigidity" states:

The Republican Party's platform in the 2000 presidential elections set the administration's tone on this issue. It called for a dramatic expansion of NATO not only in Eastern Europe (with the Baltic States, Romania, Bulgaria and Albania) but also, and most significantly, in the Middle East, the Caucasus and Central Asia. The purpose is to develop closer cooperation within NATO in dealing with geopolitical problems from the Middle East to Eurasia. The program therefore takes a broad and rather fuzzy view of Europe.

It would be premature at this stage to say that the Bush administration has had a fundamental change of heart and shed its long-ingrained reflexes in dealing with Russia.

When it comes to the future of Europe, both Americans and Europeans differ on key issues. Those differences seem to point toward three fundamental values which underpin the Bush administration's image of Europe. The first is unilateralism, of which the missile shield is a particularly telling example. The American position flies in the face of the European approach, which is based on ABM talks and multilateralism. An opposition is taking shape here between the leading European capitals, which want to deal with the matter by judicial means, and the Americans, who want to push ahead and create a fait accompli.

=== Attacking countries that harbor terrorists ===
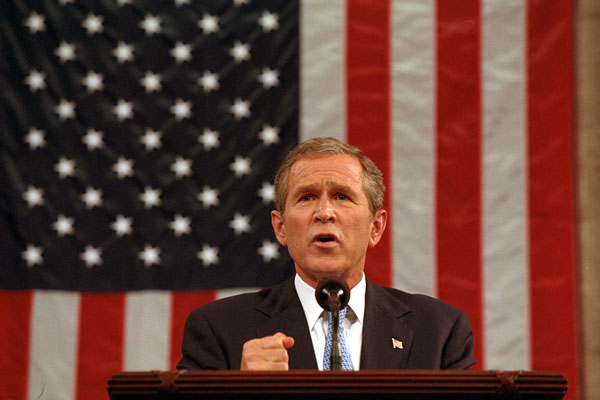

At a joint session of Congress, Bush pledged to defend the United States against the threat of terrorism. September 20, 2001 (audio only)

The doctrine was developed more fully as an executive branch response following the September 11 attacks. The attacks presented a foreign policy challenge, since it was not Afghanistan that had initiated the attacks, and there was no evidence that they had any foreknowledge of them. In an address to the nation on the evening of September 11, Bush stated his resolution of the issue by declaring that, "We will make no distinction between the terrorists who committed these acts and those who harbor them." The president made an even more aggressive restatement of this principle in his September 20, 2001 address to a joint session of Congress:

We will pursue nations that provide aid or safe haven to terrorism. Every nation, in every region, now has a decision to make. Either you are with us, or you are with the terrorists. From this day forward, any nation that continues to harbor or support terrorism will be regarded by the United States as a hostile regime.

White House Press Secretary Ari Fleischer later wrote in an autobiographical account of that address, "In a speech hailed by the press and by Democrats, [the President] announced what became known as the 'Bush Doctrine'". The first published reference after the 9/11 attacks to the terror-fighting doctrine appeared September 30 in an op-ed by political scientist Neal Coates.

This policy was used to justify the invasion of Afghanistan in October 2001, and has since been applied to U.S. military action against al-Qaeda camps in North-West Pakistan.

=== Pre-emptive strikes ===
Bush addressed cadets at the U.S. Military Academy in West Point, New York on June 1, 2002, and made clear the role preemptive war would play in the future of American foreign policy and national defense:

We cannot defend America and our friends by hoping for the best. We cannot put our faith in the word of tyrants, who solemnly sign non-proliferation treaties, and then systemically break them. If we wait for threats to fully materialize, we will have waited too long—Our security will require transforming the military you will lead—a military that must be ready to strike at a moment's notice in any dark corner of the world. And our security will require all Americans to be forward-looking and resolute, to be ready for preemptive action when necessary to defend our liberty and to defend our lives.

The stance of the Bush administration was that the harsh measures to spread the democracy worldwide are inevitable and efficacious, in which for instance, liberating Iraq would plant democracy in the area and enable it to flourish in the rest of the Middle East.

Two distinct schools of thought arose in the Bush administration regarding how to handle countries such as Iraq, Iran, and North Korea (the so-called "Axis of Evil" states). Secretary of State Colin Powell and National Security Advisor Condoleezza Rice, as well as U.S. Department of State specialists, argued for what was essentially the continuation of existing U.S. foreign policy. These policies, developed after the Cold War, sought to establish a multilateral consensus for action (which would likely take the form of increasingly harsh sanctions against the problem states, summarized as the policy of containment). The opposing view, argued by Cheney, Rumsfeld, and a number of influential Department of Defense policy makers like Wolfowitz and Richard Perle, held that direct and unilateral action was both possible and justified and that the U.S. should embrace the opportunities for democracy and security offered by its position as sole remaining superpower.

=== Democratic regime change ===
In several speeches between late 2001 and 2002, Bush expanded on his view of the U.S. foreign policy and global intervention, declaring that the United States should actively support democratic governments around the world, especially in the Middle East, as a strategy for combating the threat of terrorism, and that the nation had to act unilaterally in its own security interests, without approval of international bodies like the United Nations. This represented a departure from the Cold War policies of deterrence and containment under the Truman Doctrine and post–Cold War philosophies such as the Powell Doctrine and the Clinton Doctrine.

In his 2003 State of the Union Address, Bush declared:

Americans are a free people, who know that freedom is the right of every person and the future of every nation. The liberty we prize is not America's gift to the world, it is God's gift to humanity.

After his second inauguration, in a January 2006 speech at the National Defense University, Bush said: "The defense of freedom requires the advance of freedom."

Neoconservatives and the Bush Doctrine held that the hatred for the West and the United States particularly exists not because of actions perpetrated by the U.S., but rather because the countries from which terrorists emerge are in social disarray and do not experience the freedom that is an intrinsic part of democracy. The Bush Doctrine holds that enemies of the U.S. use terrorism as a war of ideology against the nation. The responsibility of the United States is to protect itself by promoting democracy where the terrorists are located so as to undermine the basis for terrorist activities. Elections in Egypt, Lebanon, and Palestine happened as a result of this initiative in the sense that the Muslim Brotherhood, Hezbollah, and Hamas were allowed to participate in it.

== Influences on the Bush Doctrine ==
=== Neoconservatives ===
The development of the doctrine was influenced by neoconservative ideology, and it was considered to be a step from the political realism of the Reagan Doctrine. The Reagan Doctrine was considered key to American foreign policy until the end of the Cold War, just before Bill Clinton became president. The Reagan Doctrine was considered anti-communist and in opposition to Soviet global influence, but later spoke of a peace dividend towards the end of the Cold War with economic benefits of a decrease in defense spending. The Reagan Doctrine was strongly criticized by neoconservatives, who also became disgruntled with the outcome of the Gulf War and U.S. foreign policy under Clinton, sparking them to call for change towards global stability through their support for active intervention and the democratic peace theory. Several central persons in the counsel to the Bush administration considered themselves to be neoconservatives or strongly support their foreign policy ideas.

Neoconservatives are widely known to long have supported the overthrow of Saddam Hussein in Iraq, and on January 26, 1998, the Project for the New American Century (PNAC) sent a public letter to then-President Clinton stating:

As a result, in the not-too-distant future we will be unable to determine with any reasonable level of confidence whether Iraq does or does not possess such weapons. Such uncertainty will, by itself, have a seriously destabilizing effect on the entire Middle East. It hardly needs to be added that if Saddam does acquire the capability to deliver weapons of mass destruction, as he is almost certain to do if we continue along the present course, the safety of American troops in the region, of our friends and allies like Israel and the moderate Arab states, and a significant portion of the world's supply of oil will all be put at hazard. As you have rightly declared, Mr. President, the security of the world in the first part of the 21st century will be determined largely by how we handle this threat.

Among the signatories to PNAC's original statement of Principals is George H. W. Bush's Vice President Dan Quayle, Rumsfeld, Wolfowitz, Cheney, and George W. Bush's brother Jeb Bush.

PNAC member and the chairman of the Defense Policy Board Advisory Committee (DPBAC), neoconservative Richard Perle, later expressed regret over the invasion of Iraq and ultimately put the blame for the invasion on Bush.

Other Bush cabinet members who are thought to have adopted neoconservative foreign policy thinking include Cheney and Rice.

The Bush Doctrine, in line with long-standing neoconservative ideas, held that the United States is entangled in a global war of ideas between the western values of freedom on the one hand, and extremism seeking to destroy them on the other; a war of ideology where the U.S. must take responsibility for security and show leadership in the world by actively seeking out the enemies and also change those countries who are supporting enemies.

The Bush Doctrine, and neoconservative reasoning, held that containment of the enemy as under the realpolitik of President Ronald Reagan did not work, and that the enemy of the U.S. must be destroyed preemptively before they attack—using all the United States' available means, resources and influences to do so.

On the book Winning the War on Terror Dr. James Forest of the U.S. Military Academy Combating Terrorism Center at West Point, comments: "While the West faces uncertainties in the struggle against militant Islam's armies of darkness, and while it is true that we do not yet know precisely how it will end, what has become abundantly clear is that the world will succeed in defeating militant Islam because of the West's flexible, democratic institutions and its all-encompassing ideology of freedom."

=== Natan Sharansky ===
Another part of the intellectual underpinning of the Bush Doctrine was the 2004 book The Case for Democracy, written by Israeli politician and author Natan Sharansky and Israeli Minister of Economic Affairs in the United States Ron Dermer, which Bush has cited as influential in his thinking. The book argues that replacing dictatorships with democratic governments is both morally justified since it leads to greater freedom for the citizens of such countries, and strategically wise, since democratic countries are more peaceful, and breed less terrorism than dictatorial ones.

=== Expanding United States influence ===
Princeton University research fellow Dr. Jonathan Monten, in his 2005 International Security journal article "The Roots of the Bush Doctrine: Power, Nationalism, and Democracy Promotion in U.S. Strategy", attributed the Bush administration's activist democracy promotion to two main factors: the expansion of material capabilities, and the presence of a nationalist domestic ideology. He claims that the Bush Doctrine's promotion of democracy abroad was held as vital by the Bush administration to the success of the United States in the "war on terror". It was also a key objective of the administration's grand strategy of expanding the political and economic influence of the U.S. internationally. He examines two contending approaches to the long-term promotion of democracy: exemplarism, or leadership by example, and vindicationism, or the direct application of American power, including the use of coercive force. Whereas exemplarism largely prevailed in the 20th century, vindicationism has been the preferred approach of the Bush administration.

== Criticism and analysis ==
The Bush Doctrine resulted in criticism and controversy. Peter D. Feaver, who worked on the Bush national security strategy as a staff member on the National Security Council, said he has counted as many as seven distinct Bush doctrines. One of the drafters of the National Security Strategy of the U.S., which is commonly mistakenly referred to as the "Bush Doctrine", demurred at investing the statement with too much weight. "I actually never thought there was a Bush doctrine", said Philip Zelikow, who later served as State Department counselor under Secretary of State Rice. "Indeed, I believe the assertion that there is such a doctrine lends greater coherence to the administration's policies than they deserve." Zbigniew Brzezinski, President Jimmy Carter's National Security Advisor, said he thought there was no "single piece of paper" that represents the Bush Doctrine.

Experts on geopolitical strategy note that Halford Mackinder's theories in "The Geographical Pivot of History" about the "Heartland" and world resource control are still as valid today as when they were formulated.

In his 2007 book In the Defense of the Bush Doctrine, Robert G. Kaufman wrote: "No one grasped the logics or implications of this transformation better than Halford Mackinder. His prescient theories, first set forth in Geographical Pivot of History, published in 1904, have rightly shaped American grand strategy since World War II. Mackinder warned that any single power dominating Eurasia, "the World Island", as he called it, would have the potential to dominate the world, including the United States." Kaufman is a political scientist, public policy professor and member of The Shadow Financial Regulatory Committee. He said in an interview about the book: "I wrote this book because of my conviction that the Bush Doctrine has a more compelling logic and historical pedigree than people realize."

The Bush Doctrine was polarizing both domestically and internationally. In 2008, polls showed there was more anti-Americanism than before the Bush administration formed the Bush Doctrine; this increase was probably, at least partially, a result of implementing the Bush Doctrine and conservative foreign policy.

=== Foreign interventionism ===
The foreign policy of the Bush Doctrine was subject to controversy both in the United States and internationally.

John Mearsheimer argues in his book The Great Delusion: Liberal Dreams and International Realities that a liberal hegemonic policy like the Bush Doctrine is ineffective at achieving its stated end goals and is doomed to lead to more war, anti-Americanism, and a global retreat in democracy.

Some critics of the policies were suspicious of the increasing willingness of the U.S. to use military force unilaterally.

Robert W. Tucker and David C. Hendrickson argued that it reflects a turn away from international law, and marks the end of American legitimacy in foreign affairs.

Others have stated that it could lead to other states resorting to the production of WMDs or terrorist activities. This doctrine is argued to be contrary to the just war theory and would constitute a war of aggression. Pat Buchanan writes that the invasion of Iraq had significant similarities to the 1996 neoconservative policy paper A Clean Break: A New Strategy for Securing the Realm.

Political scientist Karen Kwiatkowski in 2007 wrote in her article "Making Sense of the Bush Doctrine":

We are killing terrorists in self-defense and for the good of the world, you see. We are taking over foreign countries, setting them up with our favorite puppets "in charge," controlling their economy, their movements, their dress codes, their defensive projects, and their dreams, solely because we love them, and apparently can't live without them.

=== Radical departure ===
According to Buchanan and others, the Bush Doctrine was a radical departure from former United States foreign policies, and a continuation of the ideological roots of neoconservatism.

Initially, support for the U.S. was high, but by the end of the Bush administration, after seven years of war, anti-Americanism was high and criticism of the Bush Doctrine was widespread; nonetheless the doctrine still had support among some American political leaders.

The representation of prominent neoconservatives and their influences on the Bush Doctrine had been highly controversial among the American public.

Critics, like John Micklethwait in the book The Right Nation, claim that Bush was deceived by neoconservatives into adopting their policies.

=== Polarization ===
Anti-war critics have claimed that the Bush Doctrine was strongly polarizing domestically, had estranged U.S. allies, and belied Bush's stated desire to be a "uniter, not a divider".

=== Compassionate belief and religious influence ===
Bush often talked about his belief in compassionate conservatism and liberty as "God's gift". In his Claremont Institute article Democracy and the Bush Doctrine, Charles R. Kesler writes, "As he begins his second term, the president and his advisors must take a hard, second look at the Bush Doctrine. In many respects, it is the export version of compassionate conservatism."

=== Sociopsychological strategy and effects ===
There is also criticism on Bush Doctrine practices related to their sociopsychological effects saying they create a culture of fear.

Naomi Klein writes in her book The Shock Doctrine about a recurrent metaphor of shock, and she claimed in an interview that the Bush administration continued to exploit a "window of opportunity that opens up in a state of shock", followed by a comforting rationale for the public, as a form of social control.

=== Democratization ===
Some commentators argue that the Bush Doctrine has not aimed to support genuine democratic regimes driven by local peoples, but rather U.S.-friendly regimes installed by diplomats acting on behalf of the United States and intended only to seem democratic to American voters. For example, in the case of Afghanistan, it is argued that parliamentary democracy was downplayed by the U.S. and power concentrated in the hands of Afghan president Hamid Karzai, a U.S. ally. The election of Karzai has been described as the result of manipulation on the parts of the U.S. government and American policy maker Zalmay Khalilzad. At the same time, these commentators draw attention to the number of unpopular (but U.S.-friendly) warlords achieving "legitimating" positions under United States supervision of the elections. Some commentators interpreted voter turnout figures as evidence of "large-scale fraud". Sonali Kolhatkar and James Ingalls have written, "It remains to be seen if U.S. policymakers will ever allow anything approaching democracy to break out in Afghanistan and interfere with their plans."

Of the elections in Afghanistan, Sima Samar, former Afghan minister of Women's Affairs, stated, "This is not a democracy, it is a rubber stamp. Everything has already been decided by the powerful ones."

Most studies of American intervention have been pessimistic about the history of the United States exporting democracy. John A. Tures examined 228 cases of U.S. intervention from 1973 to 2005, using data from Freedom House. While in 63 cases a country did become more democratic, in 69 instances the country became less democratic—and the plurality of interventions, 96, caused no change in the country's democracy.

== See also ==
- Carter Doctrine
- Clinton Doctrine
- Foreign policy of the first Donald Trump administration
- Jus ad bellum
- Monroe Doctrine
  - Donroe Doctrine
- Truman Doctrine
- Obama Doctrine
- Powell Doctrine
- Reagan Doctrine
- The One Percent Doctrine
- United States presidential doctrines
- War on terror
- Weinberger Doctrine
- Wolfowitz Doctrine
