= Clinton Doctrine =

Foreign policy of the administration of U.S. president Bill Clinton (1993–2001)

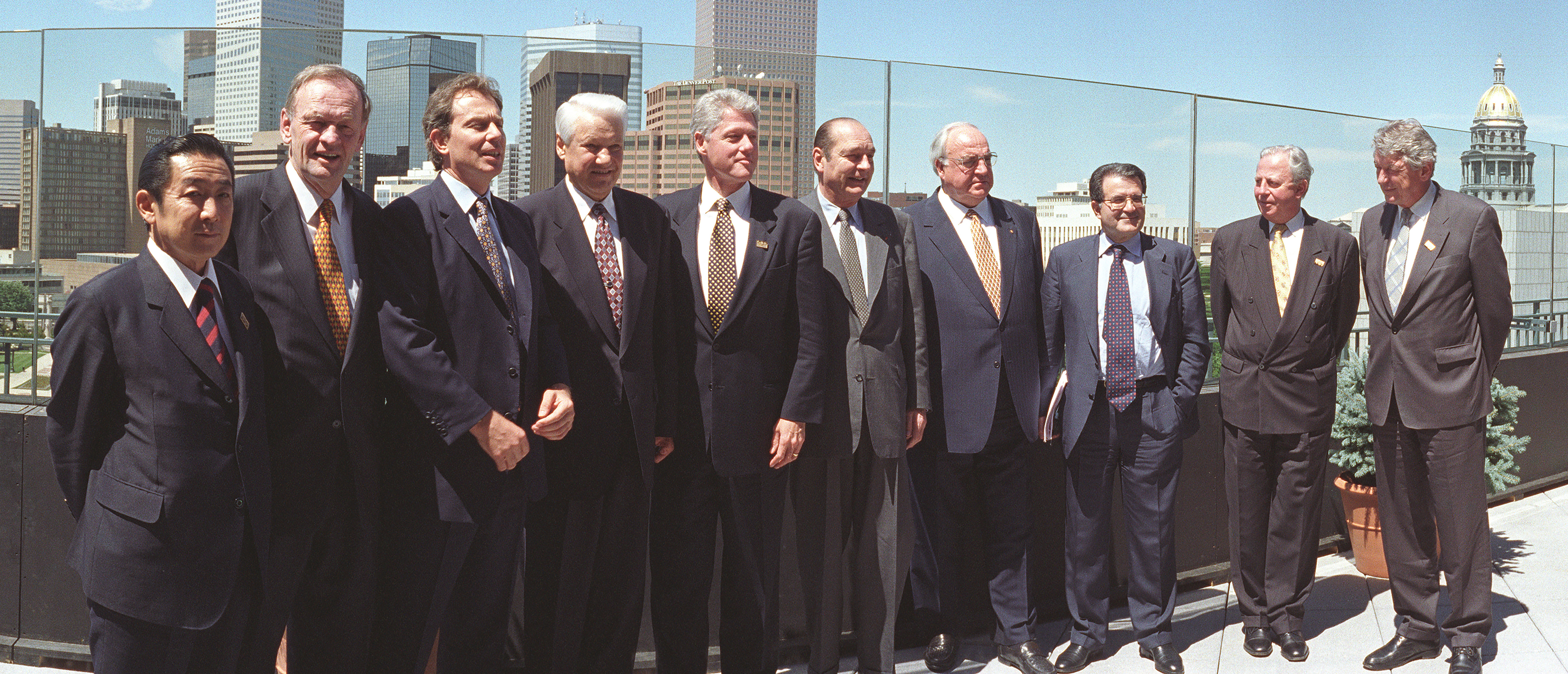
Clinton (center) with world leaders at the 23rd G8 summit in Denver, 1997

The Clinton Doctrine is not an official government statement but an interpretation made by experts of the main priorities in the foreign policy of U.S. president Bill Clinton from 1993 to 2001.

== Clinton statements ==
Various speeches have been proposed as texts for a doctrine. Thus, in a February 26, 1999, speech, President Bill Clinton said the

following:

It's easy ... to say that we really have no interests in who lives in this or that valley in Bosnia, or who owns a strip of brushland in the Horn of Africa, or some piece of parched earth by the Jordan River. But the true measure of our interests lies not in how small or distant these places are, or in whether we have trouble pronouncing their names. The question we must ask is, what are the consequences to our security of letting conflicts fester and spread. We cannot, indeed, we should not, do everything or be everywhere. But where our values and our interests are at stake, and where we can make a difference, we must be prepared to do so.

Clinton later made statements that augmented his approach to interventionism:

Genocide is in and of itself a national interest where we should act and we can say to the people of the world, whether you live in Africa, or Central Europe, or any other place, if somebody comes after innocent civilians and tries to kill them en masse because of their race, their ethnic background or their religion, and it's within our power to stop it, we will stop it.

The interventionist position was used to justify U.S. involvement in the Yugoslav Wars. Clinton was criticized for not intervening to stop the Rwandan genocide of 1994. Other observers viewed Operation Gothic Serpent in Somalia as a mistake.

The Clinton administration also promoted globalization by pushing for trade agreements. The administration negotiated a total of around 300 trade agreements, such as NAFTA. Anthony Lake who served as National Security Advisor to Clinton between 1993 and 1997, showed the Clinton administration's commitment to accelerating the process of globalization in a speech given in 1993. The speech talked about enlarging the community of democracies around the world alongside expanding free markets.

== National Security Strategy ==
In Clinton's final National Security Strategy, he differentiated between national interests and humanitarian interests. He described national interests as those that:

…do not affect our national survival, but ... do affect our national well-being and the character of the world in which we live. Important national interests include, for example, regions in which we have a sizable economic stake or commitments to allies, protecting the global environment from severe harm, and crises with a potential to generate substantial and highly destabilizing refugee flows.

Clinton's National Security Strategy provided Bosnia and Kosovo as examples of such interests and stakes. In contrast, it described humanitarian interests as those that force the nation to act:

because our values demand it. Examples include responding to natural and manmade disasters; promoting human rights and seeking to halt gross violations of those rights; supporting democratization, adherence to the rule of law and civilian control of the military; assisting humanitarian demining; and promoting sustainable development and environmental protection.

The NSS also declared the right of the United States to intervene militarily to secure its "vital interests," which included, "ensuring uninhibited access to key markets, energy supplies, and strategic resources."

== Historiography ==
Historians and political scientists evaluated Clinton's immediate predecessors in terms of how well they handled the Cold War. A dilemma has arisen regarding what criteria to use regarding presidential administrations after the end of the Cold War. Historians have debated, with inconclusive results, on the question of whether there was a consistent overall theme or schema to Clintonian foreign policy, or what scholars would call a "Clinton doctrine". The Economist reported that Henry Kissinger echoed a frequent complaint when he characterized the Clinton foreign policy as less a grand design than “a series of seemingly unrelated decisions in response to specific crises.” John Dumbrell however notes that Douglas Brinkley and others have identified a Clinton doctrine in terms of systematic efforts to expand democracy in the world. Other experts have pointed to the Clintonian emphasis on humanitarianism, especially when military intervention was called for. Democracy and humanitarianism represent the idealistic tradition in American foreign policy. Critics of Clintonianism have drawn upon the warnings of George F. Kennan, an exponent of the realist tradition. Kennan argued that idealism made poor policy, and according to Richard Russell, believed idealism that ignored the realities of power and the national interest would be self-defeating and erode American power.

Dumbrell also sees several other possible Clinton doctrines, including perhaps a systematic reluctance to become involved in foreign complications far from the American shore. Dumbrell's favorite candidate is the explicit Clinton administration policy of warning "rogue" states on their misbehavior, using U.S. military intervention as a threat. He traces the origins of this policy to presidents Jimmy Carter and Ronald Reagan, arguing that the Clinton administration made it more systematic so it deserves the term "Clinton Doctrine". However, Dumbrell concludes, it did not prove successful in practice.

== See also ==
- Bush Doctrine
- Carter Doctrine
- Obama Doctrine
- Reagan Doctrine
