= Wolfowitz Doctrine =

U.S. foreign policy doctrine

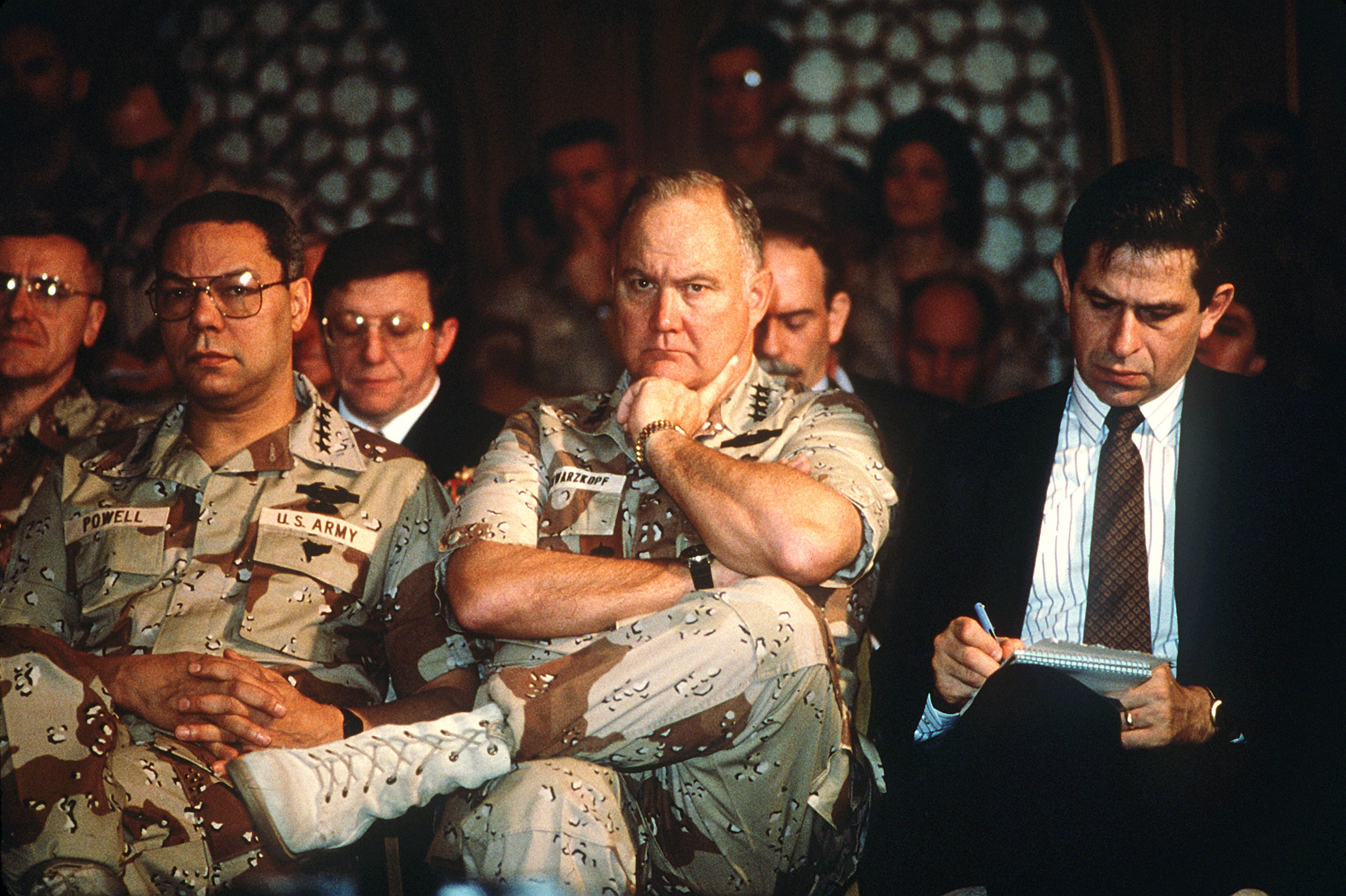
Paul D. Wolfowitz (Under Secretary of Defense for Policy), General Colin Powell (Chairman of the Joint Chiefs of Staff), and General Norman Schwarzkopf (Commander in Chief, U.S. Central Command) listening to Secretary of Defense Richard B. “Dick” Cheney during a press conference on the Gulf War, February 1991.

The term "Wolfowitz Doctrine" is an informal label used for an unofficial version of the U.S. Department of Defense's Defense Planning Guidance (DPG) for the 1994–1999 fiscal years (FY 94-99), dated February 18, 1992.

As the first DPG after the Cold War, and after the Gulf War, the draft described the United States as the world’s sole superpower and made preventing the emergence (or re-emergence) of a global or regional competitor the central strategic objective.

This included preventing any hostile power's dominance of strategically important regions whose resources could generate global power. It argued that U.S. military forces should remain sufficiently strong to deter potential competitors, even in the absence of a comparable adversary, while retaining the ability to act unilaterally, or with limited allied support, if collective security arrangements proved inadequate to protect vital U.S. interests. This implied preemptive measures.

The memorandum, drafted by a team led by Under Secretary of Defense Policy Paul Wolfowitz and supported by Dick Cheney, was leaked to the public before seen by President George W. Bush, and met with considerable public criticism. The following versions up to Cheney's 1993 Defense Strategy for the 1990s were more subtle in tone, but retained its principles. The official National Security Strategies (NSS) 1991 and 1993 follow similar lines as the draft DPG.

The same strategic objectives were also practically pursued during the presidency of Bill Clinton and explicitly reaffirmed under George W. Bush ("Bush Doctrine"). Parallels were also drawn between the emphasis on primacy in the 1992 draft and elements of the 2025 National Security Strategy.

The draft DPG of February 18, 1992, was originally classified; years later, it was officially declassified and published, although parts of the text remain blacked out and the detailed deployment scenarios in the appendix are still missing in their entirety (2026).

== DPG, Wolfowitz Doctrine, and NSS ==
The label "Wolfowitz Doctrine" is generally applied to the first draft of the DPG, not to later redactions.

The latest version of the internal DPG planning paper is not to be mistaken for the officially released National Security Strategies (NSS) August 1991, or January 1993.

The NSS of 1991/1993 show similar lines as the 1992 DPG papers. Don M. Snyder sums up both NSS as emphasizing "a steady, deliberate transition from a grand strategy of containment to one of 'collective engagement' on a regional basis." Militarily, they contained the same defense strategy of "four pillars" as developed earlier by the Cheney-Powell team. As a new element in the NSS 1991, Snyder mentions the inclusion of economic interests into the security concept. As differences to the 1991 NSS, Snyder finds in the 1993 report a "heavy emphasis on a broad goal of 'democratic peace' and the absolute necessity of American leadership in attaining it, even to a limited degree, in a world of increasing interdependencies."

The April 1992 DPG explicitly anchored its definition of U.S. national security interests in the 1991 NSS: "The national security interests of the United States are enduring, as outlined in the President's 1991 National Security Strategy Report."

According to Mann, Cheney had "liked the revised draft so much that he ordered parts of it to be declassified and made public." Mann refers to a remark by Khalilzad who had recalled that Cheney "took ownership of it". In January 1993, when the Bush administration left office, the revised draft was published as America's Defense Strategy for the 1990s.

== Purpose and status ==
The DPG was intended to establish long-term U.S. defense objectives extending into the next century:

"The choices we make in this new situation will set the nation's direction into the next century." (p. 1)

Within the Pentagon, it served as definitive guidance for the formulation of the defense program for fiscal years 1994–1999:

“This section (III. Programming for the Base Force) constitutes definitive guidance from the Secretary of Defense for formulation of the FY 94–99 Program Objectives Memoranda, to be used in conjunction with the Fiscal Guidance published by the Secretary on 14 February 1992.” (p. 20)

Following the collapse of the main adversary, Congress required a new explanation to justify continued large-scale defense spending. The development of a new strategy was "inextricably linked" to the defense budgets.

Journalist Barton Gellman described the memorandum as a near-final draft of the DPG and characterized it as “long overdue.” In his assessment, the DPG represented “the cornerstone of the defense secretary’s policy and strategy”.

According to James Mann (Center for Strategic and International Studies) it was one of the most significant documents of the preceding half century, setting forth a new "breathtaking" vision and a new post-cold war rationale for military power: "As a guide to where American foreign policy was headed it had no peer."

== Drafting process ==
The 46-page internal draft memorandum was prepared under the authority of Paul D. Wolfowitz, then Under Secretary of Defense for Policy, with contributions from his staff, including Principal Deputy I. Lewis “Scooter” Libby and Zalmay Khalilzad. In the beginning, also Abram N. Shulsky was involved. Dick Cheney was overseeing the process.

Wolfowitz was ultimately responsible for the Defense Planning Guidance, as it was issued through his office and reflected his overall outlook. He had to approve the contents. The task of preparing the document fell to Libby, who delegated the actual writing of the new strategy to Zalmay Khalilzad, a member of Libby's staff and long-time aide to Wolfowitz. In the initial drafting phase, Khalilzad solicited the views of a wide cross-section of Pentagon insiders and outside experts, including Andrew Marshall, Richard Perle, and Wolfowitz's University of Chicago mentor, nuclear strategist Albert Wohlstetter. Khalilzad completed the draft in March 1992 and requested Libby's permission to circulate it within the Pentagon. Libby agreed, according to James Mann without reading it, and within three days, Khalilzad's draft had been leaked to The New York Times by "an official who believed this post-Cold War strategy debate should be ctanarried out in the public domain."

In a 2003 interview, Wolfowitz told Sam Tanenhaus he had not reviewed or even seen the document before it was leaked.

According to James Mann, attributing the authorship to Wolfowitz himself, is a common misconception.

...although Wolfowitz and his staff played key roles, the ultimate sponsor of the new strategy was Cheney.

== Origins and background ==
According to Barton Gellmann much of the document (first draft) "parallels the extensive public statements of Defense Secretary Richard B. Cheney and Gen. Colin L. Powell, chairman of the Joint Chiefs of Staff."

Gellmann suggests Cheney and Powell believed that 1992's defense debate was a "pivotal moment" in the development of a post-Cold War security framework. For that reason, he concludes, both have given "unusually detailed briefings" to Congress to explain the "rationale for the U.S. involvement around the world as 'a constant fixture' in an era of fundamental change", "the rationale for the force, which they designed after collapse of the Warsaw Pact in late 1989."

Like their public statements, the classified memo emphasizes the virtues of collective action and the central U.S. interest in promoting increased respect for international law and "the spread of democratic forms of government and open economic systems." Also like their public statements, the document describes a reorientation of U.S. defenses away from the threat of global war with the former Soviet Union and toward potential regional conflicts.

James Mann discerns an evolution in the composition of the memorandum from 1989 to 1992. As Cold War doctrines became obsolete, the Pentagon gradually shifted its rationale for maintaining military power. Mann identifies Dick Cheney, Colin Powell, and Paul Wolfowitz as the "central figures in this drama." Cheney was the most critical of the changes under Gorbachev and the most relentless supporter of a high defense profile. Powell, on the other hand, believed in change, making him more open to cuts in defense spending. In the wake of the Berlin Wall’s fall, it became increasingly clear that Congress would pursue substantial reductions in defense spending, accompanied by a public debate over the expected peace dividend. Against this backdrop, Cheney in January 1990 asked Wolfowitz to revise the defense strategy; Wolfowitz worked closely with Powell during the process, which led to a modest proposal of defense cuts, while Bush and Cheney were refocusing the justification to different kinds of dangers like terrorism and weapons of mass destruction. By February 1991, attention shifted again to renewed risks emerging from within the disintegrating Soviet Union. After the dissolution at the end of 1991 debates about the peace dividend sparked again, and work on the DPG draft intensified.

However, in a 2003 interview, Wolfowitz said that in May 1990 he had given Secretary Cheney and the Defense Resources Board a "substantial briefing" that served as the basis for President Bush's August 2, 1990 speech in Aspen on dealing with the Iraqi threat. "At the time that was considered a revolutionary idea. By the time the President gave the speech it (the Iraqi invasion of Kuwait) had already happened." His general briefing was then made the basis for his work on the DPG until it was leaked. Wolfowitz summarized the essence of the briefing as downsizing the military and a shifting "from a strategy for being prepared to fight a global war, to being focused on two possible regional conflicts."

== Public reaction ==
Although not intended for release, the draft was leaked to The New York Times on March 7, 1992, wih excerpts published on March 8, and sparked a public controversy over U.S. foreign and defense policy. The document was widely criticized as imperialistic, as it was seen to outline a policy of unilateralism and pre-emptive military action to suppress potential threats from other nations and prevent hostile powers from rising to superpower status.

=== Article in the New York Times ===
==== Content ====
Patrick Tyler's NYT right hand column front page article U.S. Strategy Plan calls for insuring no rivals develop, published March 8, has the subtitle: A one-superpower world, and sums up the main body in the lead, underlining that the strategy aims at "thwarting" any challenges to primacy. In the main body, Tyler commented:

With its focus on this concept of benevolent domination by one power, the Pentagon document articulates the clearest rejection to date of collective internationalism, the strategy that emerged from World War II when the five victorious powers sought to form a United Nations that could mediate disputes and police outbreaks of violence.

Tyler predicted likely debates among allies about Washington's willingness to "tolerate greater aspirations for regional leadership from a united Europe or from a more assertive Japan."

In the extensive continuation of the article (p. 14) Tyler finds an implicit expectation to build "a world security arrangement that pre-empts Germany and Japan from pursuing a course of substantial rearmament, especially nuclear armament, in the future." In stating this, Tyler refers to the opening parapraph in which the draft qualifies "the integration of Germany and Japan into a U.S.-led system of collective security and the creation of a democratic 'zone of peace.' " as a "less vissble" victory after the cold war.

He sees this confirmed in the frequent reference to prevent the proliferation of nuclear weapons and other weapons of mass destruction not only in North Korea, Iraq, some of the successor republics to the Soviet Union, but also in Europe.

Nuclear proliferation, if unchecked by superpower action, could tempt Germany, Japan and other industrial powers to acquire nuclear weapons to deter attack from regional foes. This could start them down the road to global competition with the United States and, in a crisis over national interests, military rivalry.

Tyler finds the document "conspicuously devoid of references to collective action through the United Nations, which provided the mandate for the allied assault on Iraqi forces in Kuwait and which may soon be asked to provide a new mandate to force President Saddam Hussein to comply with his cease-fire obligations."

In contrast to the publicly stated strategy which, according to Tyler, "did not rule out an eventual leveling of American power as world security stabilizes and as other nations place greater emphasis on collective international action through the United Nations", the original draft "sketches a world in which there is one dominant military power whose leaders 'must maintain the mechanisms for deterring potential competitors from even aspiring to a larger regional or global role.'"

==== Reactions ====
In his 2003 interview with Vanity Fair, Wolfowitz commented the excerpts from the draft are "nowhere near as hysterical as the way the New York Times reported it. So people in the first place were reacting to the New York Times description of the draft as opposed to the actual text of the draft which the Times in fact did publish." Interpreting it as a "blueprint for a massive increase in U.S. defense spending" was wrong given the planned reduction in U.S. defense spending.

But the truth of the matter is what the Times was writing about was something that I'd never seen. What is published, while I will admit some of the corners are rounded off on it, reflects my views.

In 2011, Eric S. Edelman qualified Tyler's article as "overstated". He mentioned it was published during the electoral campaign and stated that it had set the tone for all following discussions of the document.

=== Analysis in the Washington Post ===
Barton Gellman highlighted the passages regarding the role of NATO and Eastern Europe:

In particular, the document raises the prospects of "a unilateral U.S. defense guarantee" to Eastern Europe, "preferably in cooperation with other NATO states," and contemplates use of American military power to preempt or punish use of nuclear, biological or chemical weapons, "even in conflicts that otherwise do not directly engage U.S. interests."

Gellman also cited academia, which, in his view, was centred, by contrast, on the treatment of Russia. Michael Mandelbaum, a foreign policy analyst at Johns Hopkins University, argued that the logic of preventing the reemergence of a hostile superpower suggested far greater involvement in the economy and democratization of the Russians and the Ukrainians. Yet in the current political debate, Mandelbaum is cited by Gellman, "giving them money seems to be a taboo word."

=== Political Reactions ===
One of the most immediate and forceful reactions came from Senator Joe Biden, who argued that a "Pax Americana" with the US as "globocop" meant "a direct slap at two of our closest allies – Germany and Japan." He urged that life be breathed into the UN Charter, "which envisages a permanent commitment of forces for use by the Security Council." Biden quoted the Secretary-General of the United Nations, who had stated that the Pentagon’s approach meant "the end of the UN."

=== Growing acceptance ===
John Lewis Gaddis argued that the world “to some extent” accepts U.S. hegemony, primarily when the alternatives are specified: a return to balance-of-power politics (implying higher military spending for other major actors), reliance on the United Nations to “run the world,” or international anarchy. In his view, U.S. hegemony is therefore often regarded less as a “positive good” than as the “lesser of evils.” He added that the idea of a single dominant hegemony has historical precedents, citing Rome and the British Empire.

== Revised version ==
The public outcry was such that the document was hastily rewritten under the close supervision of Secretary of Defense Dick Cheney and Chairman of the Joint Chiefs of Staff Colin Powell before a revised version was officially released on April 16, 1992. James Mann commented that Libby wanted to shift the emphasis subtly, smoothing over the “keep-the-allies-down” theme and emphasize the "broader idea of America’s enduring military superiority".

The main point shouldn’t be to block rival powers, but rather for the United States to become so militarily strong, so overwhelming that no country would dream of ever becoming a rival. (...) The costs would be too high; America’s military technology would be so advanced, its defense budget so high that no one else could afford the huge sums necessary to embark on a long-term military buildup that, even if successful, would still not catch up to the United States for thirty years or more. Thus, the United States would be the world’s lone superpower not just today or ten years from now but permanently. (Mann, p. 212)

In Mann's view the revised version still contained, in euphemistic wording, the same ideas of the US strategy as the first draft. Referring to Patrick Tyler, Mann states, that two months after the leak, a Pentagon correspondend had reported that the Pentagon had “abandoned” the idea that its strategy should be to block the emergence of a rival to American military supremacy. In a Washington Post article, Mann noted that the "vision of an American superpower was actually made more sweeping" in the revised version. Libby had just "dropped the language about competitors" in order to give the impression of softening the draft. Contrary to this, Mann sees the new version as more rigorous, insofar as it contained a "more breathtaking vision";

... America would develop such enormous superiority in military power and technology that other countries would realize it would be self-defeating to try to compete. ... Libby's revision spoke more vaguely about preserving America's "strategic depth", ... in Libby's rewrite, ... "strategic depth" referred to America's advantageous position in the world, its extensive network of bases, weaponry and advanced levels of military technology.

As a second key idea in the revised version, Mann sees the "shaping the future security environment", including "everything from peacekeeping missions to stopping the proliferation of weapons of mass destruction".

== Primary sources ==
Most declassified documents connected to the 1992–1993 Defense Planning Guidance (FY 1994–1999) are collected it two archives:

- U.S. National Archives and Records Administration (NARA): the official declassification series Interagency Security Classification Appeals Panel (ISCAP) 2008-003.

The collection contains a series of 21 internal Defense Planning Guidance FY 1994–1999 (DPG) and associated memoranda within the United States Department of Defense (DoD), dating from approximately September 1991 through May 1992, declassified in 2008.

- National Security Archive (NSA), George Washington University: a FOIA-based digital edition, "Prevent the Reemergence of a New Rival" The Making of the Cheney Regional Defense Strategy, 1991-1992 ".

William Burr, Senior Analyst and Director of the Nuclear Documentation Project at the National Security Archive, is credited at the top of the collection’s introductory section. The introduction, dated February 26, 2008, outlines the development of the Defense Planning Guidance (DPG), recounts the circumstances surrounding its leak, and traces the subsequent process of declassification. Following this introduction, fifteen numbered documents are provided as separate entries. Each link leads to the full text of a document, which is accompanied by a descriptive note and an analytical commentary presented alongside the document itself.

Documents

- August 27, 1991 (NARA doc 21): Outline of the new DPG
- February 18, 1992 (NSA doc 3): The excised draft Defense Planning Guidance that was leaked to The New York Times.
- February 18, 1992 (NSA doc 7): The same version of February 18 with blackened parts and commentary by the NSA
- March 8, 1992 (NSA doc 3 extract): In another source the excerpts published by The Times on March 8, 1992 are overlaid on the blackened portions of the Pentagon release.
- March 31, 1992 (NSA doc 6a): There is a cover memo of a draft from March 31, 1992

In the foreword to NSA doc 6a, Scooter Libby draws Dick Cheyneys attention in particular to page 12 of the attached draft. "Therein, Paul and I have adopted the formulation that America must plan forces for major contingencies critical to our interests that would enable us to act where prudent and practical even 'where very few others are with us,' and 'with only limited additional help.'" "... it emphasizes the point that we need to be able to support Israel, Korea, Saudi Arabia and others even in situations where no one else (let alone the UN) is willing to do so."

- April 12, 1992 (NARA doc 3): OPG draft -- possible major issues
- April 16, 1992 (NARA doc 1): The 16 April version with revisions made after the leak and public criticism.
- April 23, 1992 (NARA doc 7): There is a comment by the Department of the Army stamped 23 April on the 16 April 1992 Draft FY 94-95 Defense Planning Guidance with a List of actions requested during PW DPG review and an executive summary.
- May 2, and 4, 1992 (NARA doc 12): Annex A (illustrative planning scenarios)
- May 5, 1992 (NSA doc 14, NARA doc 6): Approval Draft sent by Paul Wolfowitz.
- January 1993 (NSA doc 15): Defense Strategy for the 1990s: The Regional Defense Strategy, Secretary of Defense Dick Cheney, January 1993.

== Outline ==
According to Document NSA 2, the Illustrative Outline for DPG FY 1994 - 1999 of August 27, 1991, the structure was designed as follows:

1. Trends and Prospects in the International Environment
  - Whither the Soviet Union? (handwritten insertion)
  - Increasing Regional Challenges
  - Technology: Comparative Advantages and Diffusion
2. Defense Policy and Strategy
  1. Enduring National Objectives
  2. Defense Policy
    - Broad Policy (alliances generally; burden sharing; peace-time engagement / LTC; proliferation; arms control)
    - Soviet Union
    - Western Europe and NATO
    - Eastern Europe
    - East Asia and the Pacific
    - Middle East and Southwest Asia
    - Latin America and the Caribbean
    - Africa
  3. The New Defense Strategy
    - Strategic Deterrence and Defense
    - Forward Presence
    - Crisis Response
    - Reconstitution
  4. Military Strategy (from CJCS NMS)
    - Peacetime
    - Crisis Response
    - Major Hostilities
3. The Base Force
  - Base Case Force Structure (modified if so decided)
  - Quality Personnel and Readiness
  - Sustainability Guidance
  - Mobility (draw on Mobility Requirements Study)
  - Modernization Priorities
  - Active / Reserve Mix
  - Force Reconstitution Capability

Appendices

1. Illustrative Scenarios (Class I or II level)
2. Chairman’s National Military Strategy

== Contents ==
In his NYT article, Patrick Tyler compared the leaked document with the revised version. The leaked draft and the revised April version seemed to differ substantially in tone and emphasis. While the February draft stressed unilateral action and prevention of rivals, the April text emphasized multilateral cooperation. The following excerpts, partly taken from Tyler's article illustrate the differences.

=== Superpower status ===
The first draft of the "doctrine" announces the United States's status as the world's only remaining superpower following the collapse of the Soviet Union at the end of the Cold War and proclaims its main objective to be retaining that status.

Our first objective is to prevent the reemergence of a new rival, either on the territory of the former Soviet Union or elsewhere, that poses a threat on the order of that posed formerly by the Soviet Union. This is a dominant consideration underlying the new regional defense strategy and requires that we endeavor to prevent any hostile power from dominating a region whose resources would, under consolidated control, be sufficient to generate global power. These regions include Western Europe, East Asia, the territory of the former Soviet Union, and Southwest Asia.

There are three additional aspects to this objective: First, the US must show the leadership necessary to establish and protect a new order that holds the promise of convincing potential competitors that they need not aspire to a greater role or pursue a more aggressive posture to protect their legitimate interests. Second, in the non-defense areas, we must account sufficiently for the interests of the advanced industrial nations to discourage them from challenging our leadership or seeking to overturn the established political and economic order. Finally, we must maintain the mechanisms for deterring potential competitors from even aspiring to a larger regional or global role. An effective reconstitution capability is important here, since it implies that a potential rival could not hope to quickly or easily gain a predominant military position in the world.

(DPG, Feb 18, 1992 p.2)

This was substantially rewritten in the April 16 release.

Our most fundamental goal is to deter or defeat attack from whatever source, against the United States, its citizens and forces, and to honor our historic and treaty commitments.

The second goal is to strengthen and extend the system of defense arrangements that binds democratic and like-minded nations together in common defence against aggression, builds habits of cooperation, avoids the renationalisation of security policies, and provides security at lower costs and with lower risks for all. Our preference for a collective response to preclude threats or, if necessary, to deal with them is a key feature of our regional defense strategy.

The third goal is to preclude any hostile power from dominating a region critical to our interests, and also thereby to strengthen the barriers against the reemergence of a global threat to the interests of the U.S. and our allies. These regions include Europe, East Asia, the Middle East/Persian Gulf, and Latin America. Consolidated, nondemocratic control of the resources of such a critical region could generate a significant threat to our security.

The fourth goal is to reduce sources of regional instability and limit violence should conflict occur, by encouraging the spread and consolidation of democratic government and open economic systems and discouraging the spread of destructive technology, particularly of weapons of mass destruction. To this end, we must encourage other nations to respect the rule of law and each other's economic, social, and ethnic rights.

(DPG, April 1992, p. 1)

Hal Brands commented on the fundamental goal: "The goal, in other words, was to avoid a return to bipolarity or multipolarity, and to lock in a U.S.-led unipolar order."

=== U.S. primacy ===
The doctrine establishes the U.S.'s leadership role within the new world order.

The U.S. must show the leadership necessary to establish and protect a new order that holds the promise of convincing potential competitors that they need not aspire to a greater role or pursue a more aggressive posture to protect their legitimate interests. In non-defense areas, we must account sufficiently for the interests of the advanced industrial nations to discourage them from challenging our leadership or seeking to overturn the established political and economic order. We must maintain the mechanism for deterring potential competitors from even aspiring to a larger regional or global role.

This was substantially rewritten in the April 16 release.

One of the primary tasks we face today in shaping the future is carrying long standing alliances into the new era, and turning old enmities into new cooperative relationships. If we and other leading democracies continue to build a democratic security community, a much safer world is likely to emerge. If we act separately, many other problems could result.

All unfriendly references to India, Germany, and Japan were deleted in the second draft but are still implicitly included in the final document. Gellman comments:

"... the fact is any American administration has to keep an eye on any global center of power. If Germany started to slip towards hostility and started rebuilding its military power on a substantial globally capable scale, it wouldn't matter what the declared policy would be. The United States would certainly take a very strong interest in that. It's just that they decided to take that out of the document. You don't have to say everything you're thinking.."

=== Unilateralism ===
The first draft of the "doctrine" downplays the value of international coalitions.

Like the coalition that opposed Iraqi aggression, we should expect future coalitions to be ad hoc assemblies, often not lasting beyond the crisis being confronted, and in many cases carrying only general agreement over the objectives to be accomplished. Nevertheless, the sense that the world order is ultimately backed by the U.S. will be an important stabilizing factor.

This was rewritten with a change in emphasis in the April 16 release.

Certain situations like the crisis leading to the Gulf War are likely to engender ad hoc coalitions. We should plan to maximize the value of such coalitions. This may include specialized roles for our forces as well as developing cooperative practices with others.

=== Preventive Intervention ===
The first draft of the "doctrine" stated the U.S.'s right to intervene when and where it believed necessary.

While the U.S. cannot become the world's policeman, by assuming responsibility for righting every wrong, we will retain the preeminent responsibility for addressing selectively those wrongs which threaten not only our interests, but those of our allies or friends, or which could seriously unsettle international relations.

This was softened slightly in the April 16 release.

While the United States cannot become the world's policeman and assume responsibility for solving every international security problem, neither can we allow our critical interests to depend solely on international mechanisms that can be blocked by countries whose interests may be very different than our own. Where our allies interests are directly affected, we must expect them to take an appropriate share of the responsibility, and in some cases play the leading role; but we maintain the capabilities for addressing selectively those security problems that threaten our own interests.

=== Russian threat ===
In part II. Defense Policy and Strategy, A. Trends and Prospects in the International Environment , headlined 1. Soviet Threat Reduction, the draft highlighted the possible threat posed by a resurgent Russia.

We continue to recognize that collectively the conventional forces of the states formerly comprising the Soviet Union retain the most military potential in all of Eurasia; and we do not dismiss the risks to stability in Europe from a nationalist backlash in Russia or efforts to reincorporate into Russia the newly independent republics of Ukraine, Belarus, and possibly others... We must, however, be mindful that democratic change in Russia is not irreversible, and that despite its current travails, Russia will remain the strongest military power in Eurasia and the only power in the world with the capability of destroying the United States.

This was removed from the April 16 release in favor of a more diplomatic approach:

The U.S. has a significant stake in promoting democratic consolidation and peaceful relations between Russia, Ukraine and the other republics of the former Soviet Union.

In sub-chapter 2 (Increasing Regional Challenges), the leaked parts of the original draft, which was partly redacted in the declassified version, addressed the possibility that other “potential nations or coalitions” could emerge as strategic risks in the post-Soviet environment. In the portions that were leaked to the press, this analysis was reframed more explicitly to emphasize preventing the emergence of any future competitor capable of challenging U.S. predominance.

In the leaked and later blackened introduction to chapter C (Regional Threats and Risks), the risks are more precisely attributed to regions, Europe, East Asia, Middle East, Southwest Asia, and the countries of the former Sovjet Union, furthermore Latin America, Oceania, and Sub-Saharan Africa, where the US has "important interests at stake".

The following sub-chapters focus on different areas, first of all the former Soviet Union (sub-chapter 1). The first large paragraph was leaked and later blackened.

The best means of assuring that no hostile power is able to consolidate control over the resources within the former Soviet Union is to support its successor states (especially Russia and Ukraine) in their efforts to become peaceful democracies with market-based economies. A democratic partnership with Russia and the other republics would be the best possible outcome for the United States. At the same time, we must also hedge against the possibility that democracy will fail, with the potential that an authoritarian regime bent on regenerating aggressive military power could emerge in Russia, or that similiar [sic] regimes in other successor republics could lead to spreading conflict within the former U.S.S.R. or Eastern Europe. (...)

=== Western Europe ===
Sub-chapter 2 addresses the situation in Western Europe. Where the otherwise heavily redacted section was leaked, the draft frames emerging European security arrangements as potential strategic challenges in a post-Cold War environment shaped by U.S. efforts to prevent the emergence of independent centers of military power.

While the United States supports the goal of European integration; we must seek to prevent the emergence of European-only security arrangements which would undermine NATO, particularly the Alliance's integrated command structure."

This part of the quote was considered as "meriting further consideration" and commented on in March: "A reference to maintaining NATO's integrated command structure is necessary even in a brief discussion of our policy objectives in Europe". The revised version leaves out the reference to possible threats to NATO and includes the mentioned reference to the command structure:

As NATO continues to provide the indispensable foundation for a stable security environment in Europe, it is of fundamental importance to preserve NATO's integrated military command structure.

In his 2003 interview with Vanity Fair, Wolfowitz explained that NATO was also seen as important (in the first draft) with respect to its eastward expansion:

You just go and look in Pat Buchanan's book—sort of became hysterical about this grand plan for continuing and maybe even expanding American commitments. Because we did, in a sense one of the more radical things in there was, if I can use an awful phrase, the adumbration of NATO enlargement. We weren't quite so bold as to say it but we were hinting at it. (…) … that these alliances needed to be retained, that NATO could be enlarged successfully, that we could downsize our military but we needed to retain a capability to deal with two major regional conflicts...

=== Middle East and Southwest Asia ===
The doctrine clarified the overall objectives in the Middle East and Southwest Asia.

In the Middle East and Southwest Asia, our overall objective is to remain the predominant outside power in the region and preserve U.S. and Western access to the region's oil. We also seek to deter further aggression in the region, foster regional stability, protect U.S. nationals and property, and safeguard our access to international air and seaways. As demonstrated by Iraq’s invasion of Kuwait, it remains fundamentally important to prevent a hegemon or alignment of powers from dominating the region. This pertains especially to the Arabian peninsula. Therefore, we must continue to play a role through enhanced deterrence and improved cooperative security.

The April 16 release was more circumspect, and it reaffirmed U.S. commitments to Israel as well as its Arab allies.

In the Middle East and Persian Gulf, we seek to foster regional stability, deter aggression against our friends and interests in the region, protect U.S. nationals and property, and safeguard our access to international air and seaways and to the region's oil. The United States is committed to the security of Israel and to maintaining the qualitative edge that is critical to Israel's security. Israel's confidence in its security and U.S.-Israel strategic cooperation contribute to the stability of the entire region, as demonstrated once again during the Persian Gulf War. At the same time, our assistance to our Arab friends to defend themselves against aggression also strengthens security throughout the region, including for Israel.

=== Annex A, Illustrative Scenarios ===
The redacted February 18 draft had no annexes as specified in earlier document outlines; NSA Document 13 preserves only excised prefaces from May 2 and May 4 drafts with heavily redacted marginalia. The scenarios are defined in the May 2 version as depicting

"plausible future events illustrating the types of circumstances in which the application of US military power might be required. [Consistent with the new strategy, each scenario involves [plausible] threats to US interests, and corresponding achievable military objectives. While not exhaustive,] they ~~do~~ illustrate a substantial range of the kinds of capabilities US forces might have to employ in various regions of the world."

A May 4 version reduces the emphasis on threats:

"While not exhaustive, the scenario set does illustrate a substantial range of the kinds of capabilities US forces might have to employ in various changing regions of the world."

The complete scenario texts and other annexes remain classified. The publicly released versions of Annex A does not name specific theaters of operation. Regional designations appear in the main body of the February 18, 1992 draft and in contemporaneous press reporting based on the leak, but not in the declassified annex material itself.

Barton Gellman, in his Washington Post article (March 11, 1992), mentions "a set of seven classified scenarios prepared by the Pentagon describing hypothetical roads to war by the end of the century." He refers to the NYT Times and Washington Post articles in February. Gellman writes the scenarios included "an American-led defense of Lithuania and Poland from invasion by Russia, wars against Iraq and North Korea to repel attacks on their southern neighbors and smaller-scale interventions in Panama and the Philippines." Barton states, the scenarios had come under congressional attack by political figures in the democratic and the Republican Parties, "and senior defense officials then suggested that they might be revised or abandoned."

In his 2003 interview with Vanity Fair, Wolfowitz referred to the scenarios that had been part of the leak. He explained the role of NATO in eastward expansion and mentioned the scenario for Lithuania in this context:

There was some discussion about, in a complementary document that was also leaked, about whether the United States could honor a defense commitment to Lithuania if we had one. This was considered wildly outrageous and various Democratic senators attacked us.

== Legacy ==
Between the 1992 Planning Guidance and the election of George W. Bush, the ideas of the DPG draft reverberated in neoconservative publications and campaigns, while being rejected in the official policy of President Bill Clinton from 1993 to 2001.

=== Presidency of Bill Clinton ===
Yet according to John Lewis Gaddis in his 2003 interview, Clinton is supposed to have followed the 1992 paper.

I think tacitly it was the basis of the Clinton administration's thinking. I think ever since then, there has been either explicitly or implicitly the sense that we have to hang on to this remarkable position of preeminence that we have in the world. So that's one strain that has given rise to the Bush strategy here.

Wolfowitz sees him following the principles "verbatim" :

Q: John Louis Gaddis has said that, that if you look at Clinton's policy it actually does come out of the '92 guidance to some extent.

Wolfowitz: Not to some extent. It's pretty much verbatim.

Q: But you're --

Wolfowitz: -- without acknowledgement.

James Mann, in his 2004 Washongton Post article, stated that the Clinton administration had "set aside Cheney's vision without actually repudiating it."

=== PNAC ===
The most prominent example for the coincidence with the DPG is the 1997 statement of principles by the Project for the New American Century (PNAC).

The PNAC declaration called for a global leadership role for the United States and endorsed pre-emptive measures:

We seem to have forgotten the essential elements of the Reagan Administration's success: a military that is strong and ready to meet both present and future challenges; a foreign policy that boldly and purposefully promotes American principles abroad; and national leadership that accepts the United States' global responsibilities. (...) America has a vital role in maintaining peace and security in Europe, Asia, and the Middle East. If we shirk our responsibilities, we invite challenges to our fundamental interests. The history of the 20th century should have taught us that it is important to shape circumstances before crises emerge, and to meet threats before they become dire. The history of this century should have taught us to embrace the cause of American leadership. Our aim is to remind Americans of these lessons and to draw their consequences for today. Here are four consequences:

(..)

• We need to accept responsibility for America's unique role in preserving and extending an international order friendly to our security, our prosperity, and our principles.

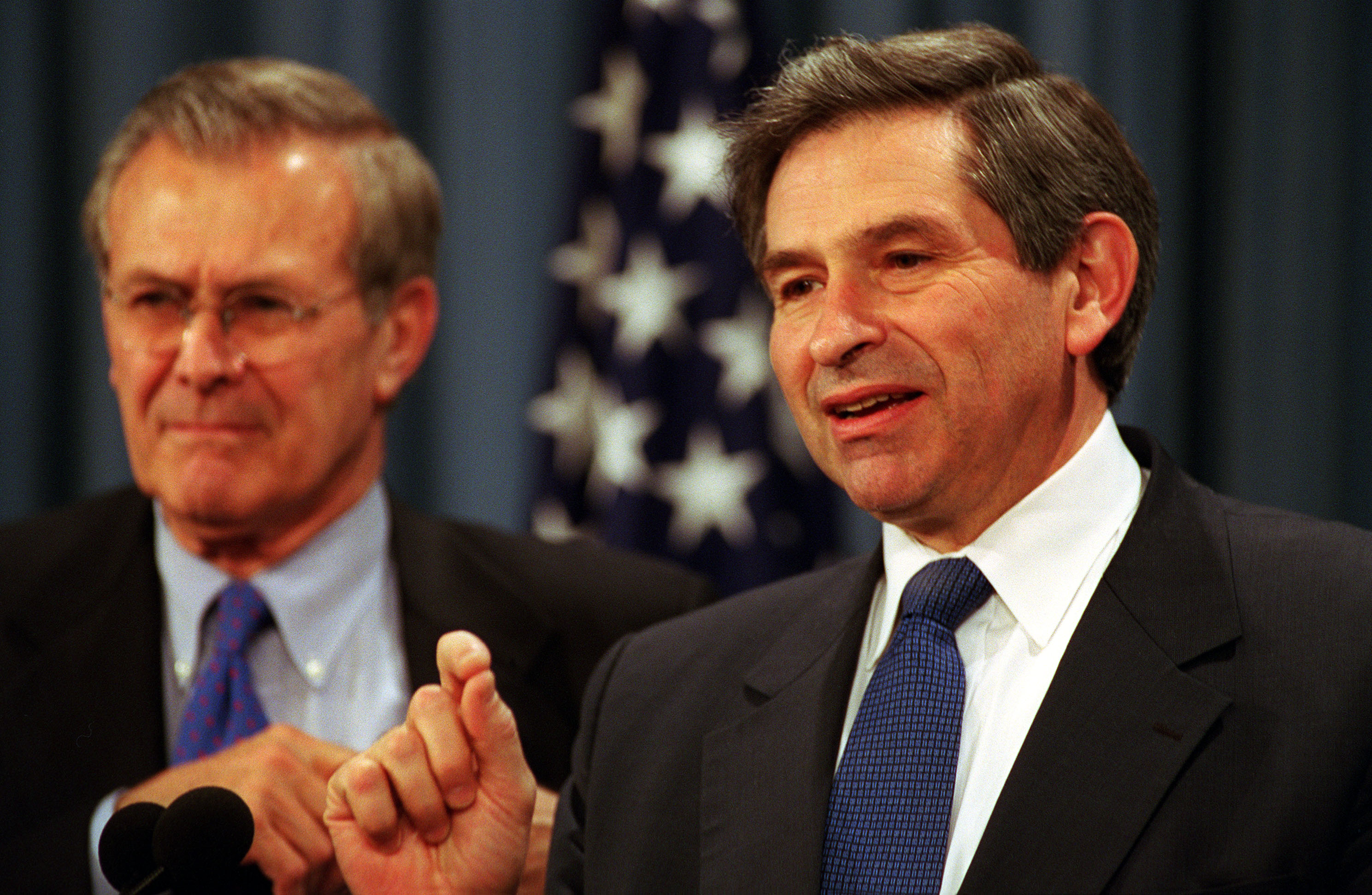
March 1, 2001: Secretary of Defense Donald Rumsfeld (left) introduced Wolfowitz to reporters during a Pentagon news briefing.

The statement was signed by Dick Cheney, Paul Wolfowitz, Scooter Libby, Zalmay Khalilzad, Donald Rumsfeld, Peter Rodman, and Elliott Abrams, among others.

PNAC’s 2000 report, Rebuilding America's Defenses: Strategy, Forces, and Resources for a New Century, authored by Thomas Donnelly (AEI), Donald Kagan, and Gary Schmitt, explicitly referred back to the original 1992 Planning Guidance as an inspiration. It described it as a

a blueprint for maintaining U.S. preeminence, precluding the rise of a great power rival, and shaping the international security order in line with American principles and interests At present the United States faces no global rival. America’s grand strategy should aim to preserve and extend this advantageous position as far into the future as possible.

=== Bush Doctrine ===
The core principles of the DPG were taken up in the so-called Bush Doctrine of 2002. Senator Edward M. Kennedy described the latter as "a call for 21st century American imperialism that no other nation can or should accept."

In a 2003 interview with PBS Frontline, historian John Lewis Gaddis argued that the Bush administration’s post-9/11 “grand strategy” was “the most fundamental reshaping of American grand strategy” since containment (1947). He also traced what he saw as its lineage back to the early-1990s Defense Planning Guidance debate, singling out Paul Wolfowitz and describing the underlying idea as a “doctrine of American hegemony” intended to preserve the United States’ unchallenged position after the Cold War.

I think the history of this particular doctrine does go back to one particular individual. This is Paul Wolfowitz … — a doctrine of American hegemony; a doctrine in which the United States would seek to maintain [the] position that it came out of the Cold War with, in which there were no obvious or plausible challengers to the United States.

Gaddis sees it as not only as the basis of the Bush administration's and the Clinton administration's thinking, but for the time after (writing 2003) " either explicitly or implicitly": "...to hang on to this remarkable position of preeminence that we have in the world." In 2002, though, Gaddis had qualified the 1993 DPG to be "little more than cheerleading sessions" and missed coherence of strategy, especially in Clintons time. In an article first published in The Heritage Foundation, Nile Gardiner analyzed Wolfowitz's influence on President Bush and concluded that Wolfowitz's ideas had left a lasting mark on Bush's inaugural address at the beginning of his second term:

The speech drew heavily from themes and ideas that Wolfowitz had advanced for many years - principally the United States must play an aggressive, proactive role in advancing freedom and democracy on the world stage.

=== Donald Trump's presidencies ===
Donald Trump|s political views have been compared to the Wolfowitz Doctrine. In March 2019, Stephen Wertheim stated in The New Republic that "Trump and the establishment are one in assuming that the United States must maintain global military dominance, regardless of circumstances, forever." The difference to Wolfowitz is seen in the absolute value given to military strength and dominance as values in themselves.

Instead of cowing others into peace, primacy has plunged America into war. It has forced the United States to resist any significant retraction of its military power, lest it lose influence relative to anyone else. The endless wars are endless because the United States has appointed itself the world’s “indispensable nation,” in Secretary of State Madeleine Albright’s formulation, responsible less for ensuring its own safety than for maintaining its material and moral privilege to police the world.

Zeno Leoni (King's College London) rejects the concept of a shift between Trump's presidency and those of his predecessors. He identifies a "deeper logic’"that resembles the Wolfowitz Doctrine:

... ensuring that no rival power dominates key regions of the world, thereby maintaining US primacy in the international system. This is not a Trump innovation; it has been a pillar of US grand strategy since the early 1990s, even when wrapped in different rhetoric – whether liberal internationalism, counter-terrorism, or “America First.”

Brian Berletic in an Oped for The Beijiing Review sees NSS 2025 and The Wolfowitz Doctrine as identical: "The Pursuit of Primacy Repackaged" (title): basically arguing

...for the conscious and active maintenance of U.S. global primacy by preventing the rise of any rival, bolstered by an unprecedented military buildup, the creation of a "burden-sharing network" and simply resold as "MAGA"—"Make America Great Again."

== Reception outside the USA ==
=== Russia ===
According to Sameed Basha in The National Interest (2023), by 2007 (see Vladimir Putin's speech at the 43rd Munich Security Conference) the Kremlin’s political elite regarded U.S. foreign policy as the implementation of the 1992 plan to impose its will on the world and to weed out rivals wherever they may emerge. In Putin’s view, this was further confirmed by American actions in Ukraine, where the United States was seen as interfering in the country’s political affairs and paving the way for potential NATO and EU membership.

== Comparison with science fiction ==
In his story Peace Probe Roy Prosterman (published in Analog 1973) laid out his vision for the future of a new American foreign policy. The United States is shown as a unilateral hegemon seeking to preserve a global Pax Americana, therefore trying to find and eliminate all kind of weapons of mass destruction. In Prosterman’s story, the United States is able to use chemical and psychological means to manipulate foreign populations. "Nineteen years before Wolfowitz penned his blueprint for American primacy, Peace Probe espoused the imperialist principles of unilateralism and preemption through the artistic medium."

== Quote ==
Probably no defense planning document since the end of World War II, with the possible exception of NSC-68, has received as much attention and discussion.

== See also ==
- Bush Doctrine
- Project for the New American Century
- A Clean Break: A New Strategy for Securing the Realm
- Unipolarity
- Grand strategy
- Pax Americana
- American exceptionalism

== Bibliography ==
- Bush, George W. (1 June 2002). "Remarks to the U.S. Military Academy". cfr.org. Archived from the original on 18 October 2016.
- Gaddis, John Lewis (2002). "Grand Strategy of Transformation". Foreign Policy (133): 50–57. doi:10.2307/3183557. JSTOR 3183557.
  Gaddis's essay is reprinted in Paul Bolt, Damon V. Coletta and Collins G. Shackleford Jr., eds., (2005), American Defense Policy (8th ed.), Baltimore, MD: Johns Hopkins University Press.
- Caputo Leiva, Orlando (2007). "The World Economy and the United States at the Beginning of the Twenty-first Century". Latin American Perspectives. 34 (1): 9–15. doi:10.1177/0094582x06296357. JSTOR 27647989. S2CID 153407145.
- Tyler, Patrick E. (8 March 1992a). "U.S. Strategy Plan Calls For Insuring No Rivals Develop". The New York Times.
- Tyler, Patrick E. (8 March 1992b). "Excerpts From Pentagon's Plan: 'Prevent the Re-Emergence of a New Rival'". The New York Times.
