= Robert W. Tucker =

American writer (1924–2025)

Robert Warren Tucker (August 25, 1924, Inspiration, Arizona – February 7, 2025, Santa Fe, NM) was an American realist writer and teacher who served as professor of American Foreign Policy at the Johns Hopkins University, Nitze School of Advanced International Studies. He was a member of the American Academy of Arts and Sciences.

== Life and career ==
Tucker was born on August 25, 1924. He received his B.S. from the United States Naval Academy in 1945 and a Ph.D. in political science from the University of California, Berkeley, in 1949. He was co-editor of The National Interest from 1985 to 1990, and president of the Lehrman Institute from 1982 to 1987. During his lifetime, he published essays in Foreign Affairs, World Policy Journal, The National Interest, Harpers, and The New Republic. His 1977 book The Inequality of Nations is a highly skeptical analysis of the Third World's efforts to redistribute power and wealth in the international system. He taught at Johns Hopkins University from 1954 to 1990. Tucker died on February 7, 2025, at the age of 100.

== Works ==
=== Books ===
- The law of War and Neutrality at Sea (1955)
- The Just War (Johns Hopkins, 1960)
- Nation or Empire? The Debate over American Foreign Policy (Johns Hopkins, 1968)
- The Radical Left and American Foreign Policy (Johns Hopkins, 1971)
- A New Isolationism: Threat or Promise? (Universe Books, 1972)
- The Inequality of Nations (Basic Books, 1977)
- The Nuclear Debate: Deterrence and the Lapse of Faith (Holmes and Meier, 1985)
- Woodrow Wilson and the Great War: Reconsidering America's Neutrality 1914-1917 (2007)

=== Co-authored books ===
With Hans Kelsen

- Principles of International Law, 2nd edition (Holt, Rinehart and Winston, 1966)

With Robert E. Osgood

- Force, Order and Justice (Johns Hopkins, 1967)

With David C. Hendrickson

- The Fall of the First British Empire: Origins of the War of American Independence (Johns Hopkins, 1982).
- Empire of Liberty: The Statecraft of Thomas Jefferson (Oxford University Press, 1990)
- The Imperial Temptation: The New World Order and America's Purpose (Council on Foreign Relations, 1992)

=== Papers ===
- "A Test of Power" by Robert W. Tucker and David C. Hendrickson The National Interest, 09.01.2006
- "The Sources of American Legitimacy" by Robert W. Tucker and David C. Hendrickson Foreign Affairs, November/December 2004
- "Thomas Jefferson and American Foreign Policy" by Robert W. Tucker and David C. Hendrickson Foreign Affairs, Spring 1990
