= Obama Doctrine =

Principles of U.S. president Barack Obama's foreign policy

The Obama Doctrine is used to describe one or several principles of the foreign policy of the Obama administration. In 2015, during an interview with The New York Times, President Barack Obama said: "You asked about an Obama doctrine, the doctrine is we will engage, but we preserve all our capabilities".

Unlike precisely defined policies such as the Monroe Doctrine, Truman Doctrine, Kennedy Doctrine, Nixon Doctrine, Carter Doctrine, Reagan Doctrine, or Bush Doctrine, the Obama Doctrine is not a specific foreign policy introduced by the executive. This has led journalists and political commentators to analyze what the exact tenets of an Obama Doctrine might look like. Generally speaking, it is widely accepted that a central part of such a doctrine would emphasize negotiation and collaboration rather than confrontation and unilateralism in international affairs. This policy was praised by some as a welcome change from the interventionist Bush Doctrine.

Critics of Obama's unilateral policies (such as targeted killings of suspected enemies of the U.S.) including former United States Ambassador to the United Nations John Bolton, have described it as overly idealistic and naïve, promoting appeasement of adversaries. Others have drawn attention to its radical departure in tone from not only the policies of the Bush administration but many former presidents as well. Some trace the origin of the Obama Doctrine to a speech he delivered at the U.S. Military Academy in West Point, New York in May 2014, where he asserted that the "United States will use military force, unilaterally if necessary, when our core interests demand it," but for indirect threats or humanitarian crises, "we must mobilize partners to take collective action." This doctrine of "moral multilateralism," some argue, reflects Obama's interest in philosopher Reinhold Niebuhr, who supported an interventionist U.S. foreign policy but warned against hubris and moral misjudgment.

== Pre-presidency ==
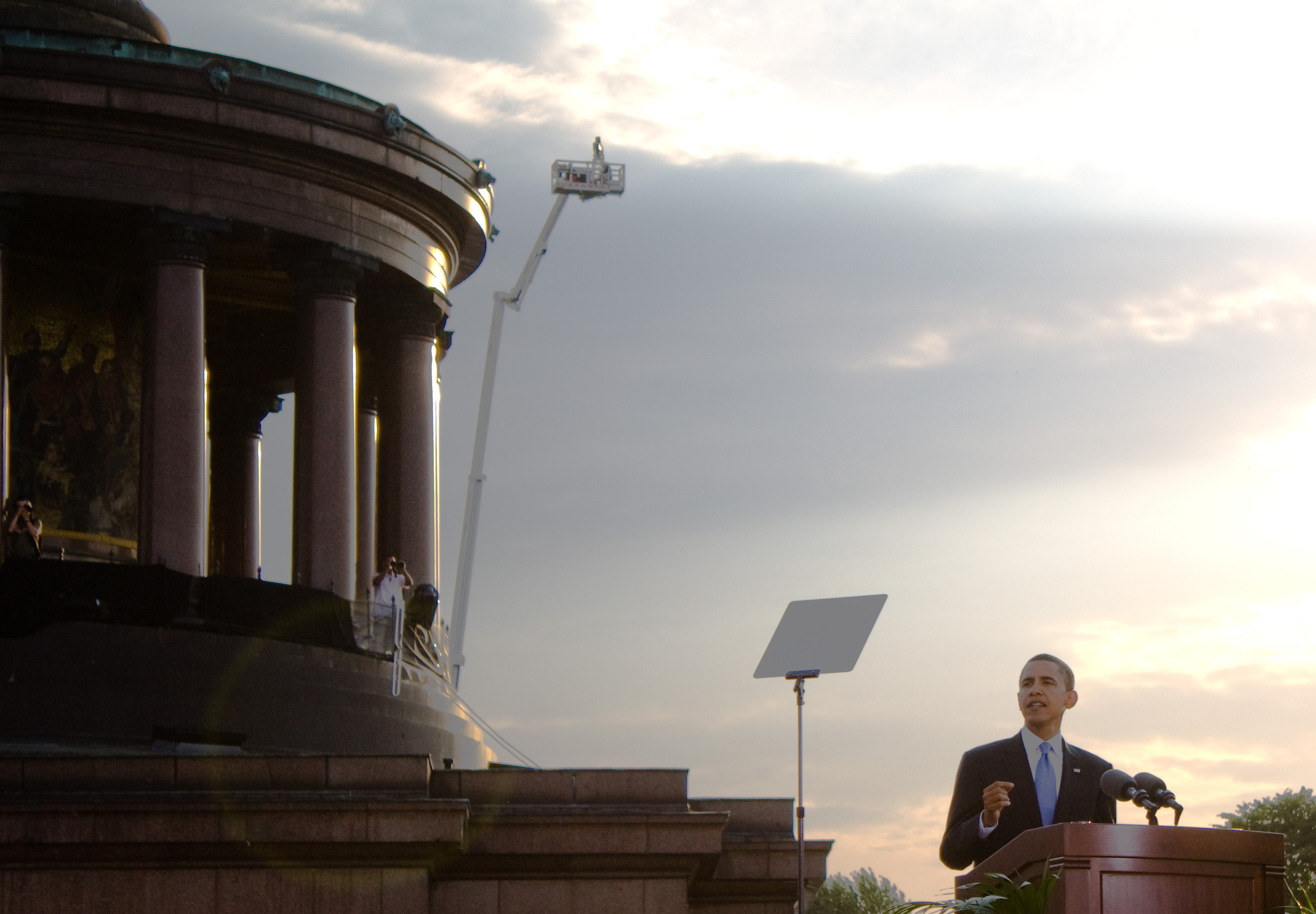
Foreign policy was an important part of Barack Obama's 2008 presidential campaign, which included a major speech at the Victory Column in Berlin, Germany.

The term "Obama Doctrine" was used before the start of Obama's presidency, while he was still only a candidate in the Democratic primaries. In an article in The Providence Journal from August 28, 2007, James Kirchick used the term in a derogatory sense, and argued that the Obama Doctrine could be summarized as: "The United States will remain impassive in the face of genocide." This critique was based on an interview Obama had given to the Associated Press on July 21, where he said that "the United States cannot use its military to solve humanitarian problems" and that "preventing a potential genocide in Iraq isn't a good enough reason to keep U.S. forces there." Hilary Bok, guest-blogging for Andrew Sullivan at The Atlantic's The Daily Dish, refuted Kirchick's representation of Obama's foreign policy views as a distortion. Bok pointed to Obama's use of anti-genocide activist Samantha Power as a political advisor, and to several interviews the candidate had given expressing concern for the situation in Darfur and elsewhere. Later, in a presidential debate with Senator John McCain, Obama stated that the U.S. occasionally would have to "consider it as part of our interests" to carry out humanitarian interventions.

Later in the campaign, when asked the question about himself at one of the Democratic presidential debates in March, Obama answered that his doctrine was "not going to be as doctrinaire as the Bush doctrine, because the world is complicated." He added that the U.S. would have to "view our security in terms of a common security and a common prosperity with other peoples and other countries." Later, this doctrine was elaborated on as "a doctrine that first ends the politics of fear and then moves beyond a hollow, sloganeering 'democracy promotion' agenda in favor of 'dignity promotion,'" that would target the conditions that promoted anti-Americanism and prevented democracy. This policy was quickly criticized by Dean Barnett of The Weekly Standard as naïve. Barnett argued that it was not a "climate of fear" that lay behind Islamic extremism, but "something more malicious".

Then-President George W. Bush, in a May 2008 speech at the Knesset, likened direct negotiations with Iran, or terrorist groups such as Hamas and Hezbollah, to attempts at "appeasement" of Nazi Germany in the late 1930s. The comments were interpreted by some in the media and by Obama himself as a direct criticism of Obama. Obama called the comments "a false political attack", and added that "George Bush knows that I have never supported engagement with terrorists," while Senator Joe Biden, Obama's running mate, said that Bush's comments were "demeaning to the presidency of the United States of America". Bush spokeswoman Dana Perino, pressed for a clarification, stated that Bush's comments were "not specifically pointed to one individual," and that "all of you who cover these issues ... have known that there are many who have suggested these types of negotiations".

In 2008, the term "Obama Doctrine" was used by Lynn Sweet of the Chicago Sun-Times in a comment on a speech given by then-Senator Obama at the Woodrow Wilson Center on July 15. Here, Obama listed the five pillars of his foreign policy, should he be elected:

I will focus this strategy on five goals essential to making America safer: ending the war in Iraq responsibly; finishing the fight against al Qaeda and the Taliban; securing all nuclear weapons and materials from terrorists and rogue states; achieving true energy security; and rebuilding our alliances to meet the challenges of the 21st century,

Sweet pointed out that these ideas were a reiteration of the essay "Renewing American Leadership," that Obama had written for Foreign Affairs magazine in the summer of 2007.

== As president ==
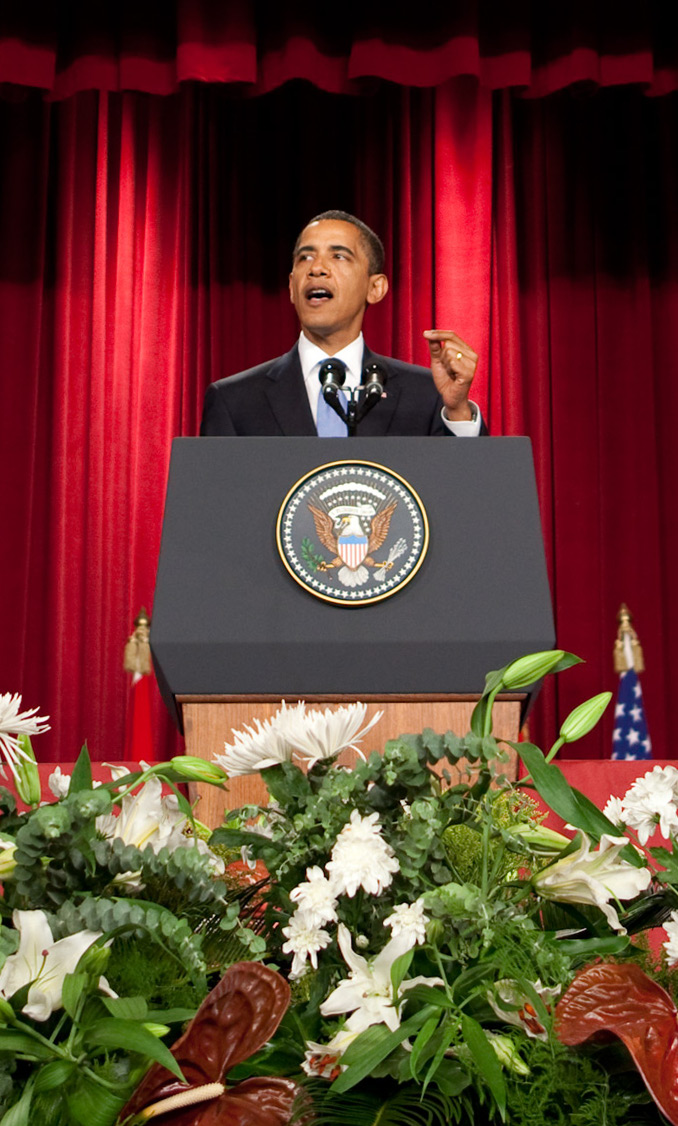
As president, an important part of Barack Obama's foreign policy was reaching out to Muslim countries. On June 4, 2009, the president delivered the speech "A New Beginning" at Cairo University.

Not long after Obama's inauguration on January 20, 2009, commentators began to speculate on the emergence of a distinct Obama Doctrine in action. A proposal to close the detention facility at Guantanamo Bay, the rejection of the phrase "Global War on Terror", and the reconciliation with Russia through the abandonment of the anti-ballistic missile program in Poland and the Czech Republic, were taken as clear signs of a reversal of the principles of the Bush administration. Critics, such as Pat Buchanan, quickly derided these policies and criticized them for weakening the United States' foreign relations. In an op-ed, Buchanan argued that Obama was "ceding moral high ground to regimes and nations that do not deserve it."

In early April 2009, American journalist Marc Ambinder predicted that the president, with time, would have to take a more pragmatic stance on the legal status of detainees. Meanwhile, professor of international politics Daniel W. Drezner suggested the Obama Doctrine was influenced by French philosopher Montesquieu, whose thinking, in Drezner's words, could be crudely summarised, "useless conflicts weaken necessary conflicts." In Drezner's interpretation, the Obama Doctrine was to abandon foreign policies that had proven fruitless and unpopular to focus on more important and pressing issues. On April 16, E. J. Dionne wrote a column for The Washington Post expressing a highly positive view of what he saw as the Obama Doctrine. The column came in the direct aftermath of the successful rescue of Captain Richard Phillips from Somali pirates. He defined the doctrine as "a form of realism unafraid to deploy American power but mindful that its use must be tempered by practical limits and a dose of self-awareness." Dionne also pointed to the influence Reinhold Niebuhr has on Obama, and quoted Niebuhr's warning that some of "the greatest perils to democracy arise from the fanaticism of moral idealists who are not conscious of the corruption of self-interest" and that a "nation with an inordinate degree of political power is doubly tempted to exceed the bounds of historical possibilities."

Later that month, at the Summit of the Americas in Trinidad and Tobago, Obama was again asked the question he was asked during the campaign, of defining the Obama Doctrine. The president replied that "the United States remains the most powerful, wealthiest nation on Earth, but we're only one nation, and that the problems that we confront, whether it's drug cartels, climate change, terrorism, you name it, can't be solved just by one country." In addition, Obama expressed a desire for the U.S. to seek friendship with all, harkening back to President Franklin D. Roosevelt's Good Neighbor policy. "I pledge to you that we seek an equal partnership. There is no senior partner and junior partner in our relations," he said. "There is simply engagement based on mutual respect and common interests and shared values." Political policy analysts such as Ray Walser lamented this stance, arguing that portraying America as "equal" among the nations of the world would reduce its global stature.

Obama later elaborated on his foreign policy views, particularly relating to Muslim countries, in a high-profile speech given at Cairo University in June, where he called for reform of undemocratic countries from within. Obama's efforts to improve foreign relations received praise even from former Republican Senator Chuck Hagel. Meanwhile, foreign policy analyst Reginald Dale, believed the president's policy of reconciliation had weakened the country in relation to other countries, such as Russia, China, and North Korea. The even-handed treatment of all countries was also critiqued by some conservative critics, noting in particular that in calling for all nuclear weapons to be turned aside Obama had placed U.S. and Israeli nuclear programs on the same moral level as Iran's alleged weapons plans. There was also concern that Obama did not specifically identify terrorists as a common risk to the United States and the Middle East. Others criticized Obama for the lack of a well-defined doctrine. American journalist Charles Krauthammer said that "I would say his vision of the world appears to me to be so naïve that I am not even sure he's able to develop a doctrine." Anders Stephanson, professor of history at Columbia University, coming from a different perspective, argued that an overly pragmatic foreign policy and the absence of an overarching ideology could facilitate the return of a simplified American exceptionalism policy at a later point.

The question of the Obama Doctrine once more came to the fore in connection with his acceptance speech at the Nobel Peace Prize ceremony in Oslo, Norway in December 2009. The awarding of the peace prize drew a mixture of praise and criticism from all sides of the political spectrum. Obama took the opportunity of the speech to address some of this criticism, and argue for the occasional use of force in international relations. "To say that force is sometimes necessary is not a call to cynicism -- it is a recognition of history; the imperfections of man and the limits of reason," he said. According to John Dickerson of Slate, the president silenced his conservative critics who have labelled him as weak, while maintaining an insistence on diplomatic engagement. The speech was generally well received, and was praised by conservative figures in American politics, including Sarah Palin, Newt Gingrich, and John Boehner.

Following the February 2011 revolution in Egypt, Harvard professor Niall Ferguson argued that Obama's strategic thinking failed to understand the events in the region, writing: "I can think of no more damning indictment of the administration's strategic thinking than this: it never once considered a scenario in which [Egyptian President] Mubarak faced a popular revolt ... All the president and his NSC team seem to have done is to draft touchy-feely speeches like the one he delivered in Cairo early in his presidency."

In a 2016 article titled The Obama Doctrine, The Atlantic's editor-in-chief Jeffrey Goldberg wrote: "Obama has come to a number of dovetailing conclusions about the world, and about America's role in it. The first is that the Middle East is no longer terribly important to American interests. The second is that even if the Middle East were surpassingly important, there would still be little an American president could do to make it a better place. The third is that the innate American desire to fix the sorts of problems that manifest themselves most drastically in the Middle East inevitably leads to warfare, to the deaths of U.S. soldiers, and to the eventual hemorrhaging of U.S. credibility and power. The fourth is that the world cannot afford to see the diminishment of U.S. power. Just as the leaders of several American allies have found Obama's leadership inadequate to the tasks before him, he himself has found world leadership wanting: global partners who often lack the vision and the will to spend political capital in pursuit of broad, progressive goals, and adversaries who are not, in his mind, as rational as he is. Obama believes that history has sides, and that America's adversaries—and some of its putative allies—have situated themselves on the wrong one, a place where tribalism, fundamentalism, sectarianism, and militarism still flourish. What they don't understand is that history is bending in his direction."

=== National Security Strategy ===
In May 2010, the Obama administration issued a report outlining its National Security Strategy. The document called for more global engagement and sought to counter fears that the U.S. is at war with Islam. It dropped the Bush era controversy over language such as the phrase "global war on terror" and reference to "Islamic extremism," adding that "The United States is waging a global campaign against al-Qaeda and its terrorist affiliates. Yet this is not a global war against a tactic - terrorism, or a religion - Islam. We are at war with a specific network, al-Qaeda, and its terrorist affiliates." It also called for engagement with "hostile nations," closer relations with China and India, and a focus on strengthening the U.S. economy.

Secretary of State Hillary Clinton called democracy and human rights central to the strategy, adding that "We cannot sustain this level of deficit financing and debt without losing our influence, without being constrained about the tough decisions we have to make."

In his March 28, 2011, speech on justifying airstrikes against the Gaddafi regime in Libya, Obama stated the United States can use military force "decisively, and unilaterally when necessary to defend our people, our homeland, our allies, and our core interests." He also stated that where U.S. interests are not directly threatened. Still, its ideals and values are threatened, or when there is a regional security crisis, the United States is willing to take a leadership role in intervention, provided that an international coalition shares the burden.

==== Sanctions as part of the NSS ====
Economic and other sanctions were developed into a valuable and focused tool by the Department of the Treasury over the second Obama administration. They are the subject of a book by Juan Zarate, a former White House staffer. The aim is to shut off the market access of enemy banks, companies, and state bodies. The denial of access to bond markets can hurt the enemy. This was developed in the early years of the 21st century by practice against North Korea and later Iran. The relevant paragraph in the NSS reads as follows:

That is precisely the reason we should strengthen enforcement of international law and our commitment to engage and modernize international institutions and frameworks. Those nations that refuse to meet their responsibilities will forsake the opportunities that come with international cooperation. Credible and effective alternatives to military action—from sanctions to isolation—must be strong enough to change behavior, just as we must reinforce our alliances and our military capabilities. And if nations challenge or undermine an international order that is based upon rights and responsibilities, they must find themselves isolated.

Washington began isolating Vladimir Putin's Russia, slowly shutting off market access for Russian banks, companies, and state bodies with $714 billion of dollar debt. French, German, and British banks, amongst others, may feel some pain because they are involved in the Russian economy. Financial sanctions were the West's first response to Russia's annexation of Crimea and continued bellicosity toward the rest of Ukraine, a Treasury Department official bragged that the Treasury is "at the center of our national security," but sanctions have their detractors, such as Drezner. "Fifteen years ago, the idea that the Treasury Department would be at the center of our national security would have been inconceivable," Assistant Secretary of the Treasury for Terrorist Financing Daniel Glaser said in a 2014 interview. "But we have developed a whole new set of tools to put at the president's disposal." An in-depth Bloomberg report on Russian prospects and European tax-havens indicated that Putin associates might be in financial difficulty; however on May 5, 2014, the Russian taxpayer provided funds to start a domestic online card payment service. Previously, Russians had relied on Visa and MasterCard services, but when these services were temporarily interrupted by US sanctions in March 2014, the Russians decided that they were unreliable and redundant.

In the last week of June 2014, a court fined BNP Paribas $9 billion because it had handled foreign exchange transactions with Sudan, Iran, and Cuba from 2004 to 2012. The company will be temporarily barred from handling some U.S. dollar transactions. On July 1, Putin stated that the U.S. had attempted to blackmail France: in exchange for cancelling the Mistral-class amphibious assault ship contract with Russia, the United States had offered to drop the fines on BNP.

==== Criticism ====
The NSS document was viewed skeptically in the Muslim world. Pakistani newspaper Dawn had an editorial saying that the document gives "room to express scepticism over the new doctrine because we still see the US acting as the world's policeman. Mr Obama's statement that 'the US must reserve the right to act unilaterally if necessary to defend our nation and our interests' is a clear indication that the US has not abandoned its war doctrine as such. ... Human rights violations committed by the US are countless." An Al Jazeera English blog post said the document "highlights the emphasis and priorities of each president depending on his worldview and US domestic and international standing," though it added that,

A quick review of the National Security Strategy of his predecessors Clinton and Bush, for example, underlines the similarities in structuring and phrasing such documents. ... The bottom line for the US establishment over the last few decades has remained the same despite (or as a result of) major international transformations. In each and every NSS we are to conclude that isolationism is bad for security and protectionism is terrible for prosperity. Expect the US to go beyond its borders to dominate new frontiers - not only geographically, militarily or economically as a traditional empire, but also cyber, space and other technological frontiers.

Critics have further looked at the administration's policies within the United States. James Carafano of The Heritage Foundation noted that Obama's stance is marked by "an overwhelming desire to substitute soft power for hard power" and that the president "has no strategy for when the other side chooses not to cooperate, as in the case of Iran." A Washington Times editorial criticized the president's strategy, stating that it should not be "some kind of outreach initiative, it is the framing document for America's global safety. The United States cannot effectively combat the root causes of Islamic extremism by ignoring them." In October 2011, Frederick and Kimberly Kagan, writing in The Weekly Standard, referred to the Obama Doctrine as "American retreat". This followed the removal of U.S. military forces from Iraq, and the administrations failure to reach goals stated in 2009 regarding the withdrawal of those forces. This view is shared by American political science professor Fouad Ajami, who called the Obama "The herald of this American retreat."

=== Deficit reduction plan and the "Defense Strategic Guidance" document ===
As part of his deficit reduction plan, Obama announced that security spending growth would be reduced by four percent from previously planned increases, holding the spending increases below the inflation rate. A great deal of this cost containment (in money and the loss of American service members) came from replacing massive land invasions with selective drone strikes or special operations missions that have resulted in the deaths of top terrorist leaders, including Osama bin Laden.

These limited resources will be focused and managed to "Ensure U.S. forces can defeat more than one enemy at once", while the previous Bush administration had only planned to "decisively" win in only one of two "near-simultaneous conflicts".

In a rare appearance at the Pentagon on January 5, 2012, Obama unveiled a far-reaching defense review under which thousands of troops were expected to be cut. The new strategy would end "long-term nation-building with large military footprints" and would instead pursue a national security strategy based on "smaller conventional ground forces". Secretary of Defense Leon Panetta emphasized the military would retain its ability to confront more than one threat at a time, and would be more flexible and adaptable than in the past. Obama had been closely involved with shaping the blueprint, and met with high-ranking defense officials six times over a quarter. The strategy shifted the Pentagon away from its long-standing doctrine of being able to wage two wars simultaneously. "Even when U.S. forces are committed to a large-scale operation in one region, they will be capable of denying the objectives of – or imposing unacceptable costs on – an opportunistic aggressor in a second region. U.S. forces will plan to operate whenever possible with allied and coalition forces."

== See also ==
- Clintonism
- Trumpism
- Yemen model
