= Powell Doctrine =

1990s U.S. military doctrine named for General Colin Powell

The "Powell Doctrine" is a term named after General Colin Powell, for a military doctrine that Powell created in the run-up to the 1990–1991 Gulf War. The doctrine poses questions emphasizing national security interests, overwhelming strike capabilities with an emphasis on ground forces, and widespread public support, all of which have to be answered affirmatively before military action is taken. Powell's doctrine is based in large part on the Weinberger Doctrine, devised by Caspar Weinberger during his tenure as Secretary of Defense (at which time Powell was Weinberger's senior military assistant).

== Summary ==
The Powell Doctrine states that a list of questions all have to be answered affirmatively before military action is taken by the United States:

1. Is a vital national security interest threatened?
2. Do we have a clear attainable objective?
3. Have the risks and costs been fully and frankly analyzed?
4. Have all other non-violent policy means been fully exhausted?
5. Is there a plausible exit strategy to avoid endless entanglement?
6. Have the consequences of our action been fully considered?
7. Is the action supported by the American people?
8. Do we have genuine broad international support?

As Powell said in an April 1, 2009, interview on The Rachel Maddow Show, it denotes a nation's exhausting of all "political, economic, and diplomatic means", which, only if all were futile, would result in the condition that the nation should resort to military force. Powell has also asserted that when a nation is engaging in war, every resource and tool should be used to achieve decisive force against the enemy, minimizing casualties, and ending the conflict quickly by forcing the weaker force to capitulate.

== Analysis and commentary ==
The Powell Doctrine has been reported as an emerging legacy from the wars in Korea and Vietnam and the "Never Again vs. Limited War" policy debates (either win or don't start versus value of limited war) and Caspar Weinberger's Six Tests described in his 1984 speech "The Uses of Military Power". It has been used to compare the Vietnam War, the Gulf War, and the Iraq War.

== See also ==
- Bush Doctrine
- Just war theory
- Pottery Barn rule
- Reagan Doctrine
- Shock and awe
- Weinberger Doctrine
