= Nixon Doctrine =

Foreign policy espoused by U.S. president Richard Nixon in 1969

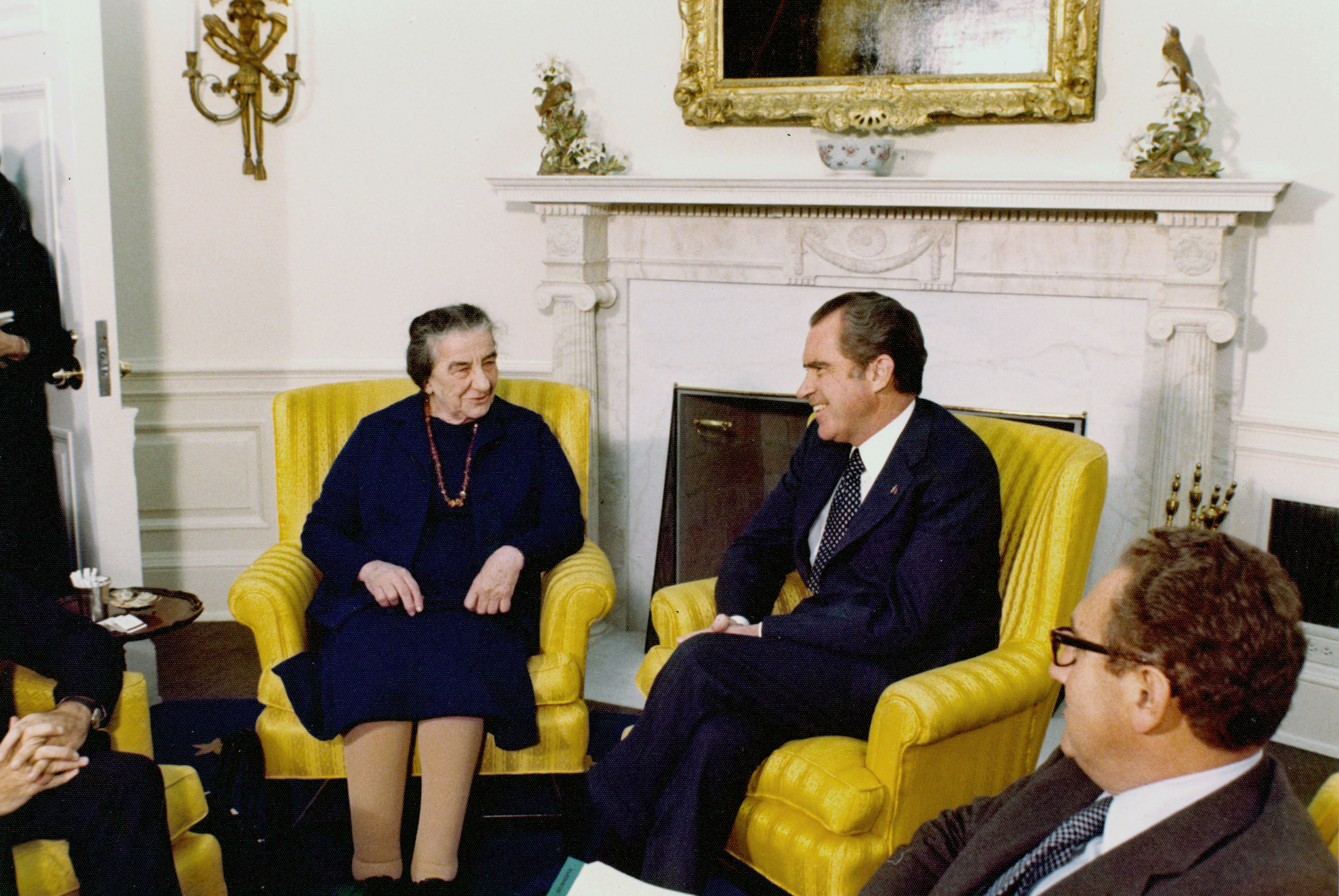
President Richard Nixon speaking with Israeli prime minister Golda Meir and U.S. secretary of state Henry Kissinger on November 1, 1973

The Nixon Doctrine (sometimes referred to as the Guam Doctrine) was the foreign policy doctrine of Richard Nixon, the 37th president of the United States from 1969 to 1974. It was put forth by Nixon on July 25, 1969, during a press conference in Guam, and formalized in his speech on Vietnamization on November 3, 1969.

According to Gregg Brazinsky, author of "Nation Building in South Korea: Koreans, Americans, and the Making of a Democracy", Nixon stated that "the United States would assist in the defense and developments of allies and friends" but would not "undertake all the defense of the free nations of the world." This doctrine meant that each ally nation was in charge of its own security in general, but the U.S. would act as a nuclear umbrella when requested. The doctrine argued for the pursuit of peace through a partnership with American allies.

== Background ==
At the time of Nixon's first inauguration in January 1969, the United States had been engaged in combat in Vietnam for almost four years. The war had so far killed over 30,000 Americans and several hundred thousand Vietnamese. By 1969, U.S. public opinion had moved decisively to favoring ending the Vietnam War; a Gallup poll in May showed 56% of the public believed sending troops to Vietnam was a mistake. Of those over 50 years old, 61% expressed that belief, compared to 49% of those between ages 21 and 29, even if tacit abandonment of the SEATO Treaty was ultimately required and caused a complete communist takeover of South Vietnam despite previous U.S. guarantees. Because Nixon campaigned for "Peace with Honor" in relation to Vietnam during the 1968 presidential election, ending the war became an important policy goal for him.

== Doctrine ==
During a stopover during an international tour on the U.S. territory of Guam, Nixon formally announced the doctrine. Nixon declared the United States would honor all of its treaty commitments in Asia, but "as far as the problems of international security are concerned ... the United States is going to encourage and has a right to expect that this problem will increasingly be handled by, and the responsibility for it taken by, the Asian nations themselves".

Later, from the Oval Office in an address to the nation on the Vietnam War on November 3, 1969, Nixon said:

First, the United States will keep all of its treaty commitments. Second, we shall provide a shield if a nuclear power threatens the freedom of a nation allied with us or of a nation whose survival we consider vital to our security. Third, in cases involving other types of aggression, we shall furnish military and economic assistance when requested in accordance with our treaty commitments. But we shall look to the nation directly threatened to assume the primary responsibility of providing the manpower for its defense.

== Doctrine in practice ==
The doctrine was exemplified by the process of Vietnamization regarding South Vietnam and the Vietnam War. It also played elsewhere in Asia including Iran, Taiwan, Cambodia, and South Korea. The doctrine was an explicit rejection of the practice that sent 500,000 U.S. soldiers to South Vietnam, even though there was no treaty obligation to that country. A major long-term goal was to reduce the tension between the United States and the Soviet Union and mainland China, so as to better enable the policy of détente to work.

The particular Asian nation the doctrine was aimed at with its message that Asian nations should be responsible for defending themselves was South Vietnam, but Shah Mohammad Reza Pahlavi of Iran seized upon the Nixon Doctrine with its message that Asian nations should be responsible for their own defense to argue that the Americans should sell him arms without limitations, a suggestion that Nixon eagerly embraced. The U.S. turned to Saudi Arabia and Iran as "twin pillars" of regional stability. Oil price increases in 1970 and 1971 would allow funding both states with this military expansion. Total arms transfers from the United States to Iran increased from $103.6 million in 1970 to $552.7 million in 1972; those to Saudi Arabia increased from $15.8 million in 1970 to $312.4 million in 1972. The U.S. would maintain its small naval force of three ships in the Gulf, stationed since World War II in Bahrain, but would take on no other formal security commitments.

One factor in reducing open-ended American commitments was financial concern as the war in Vietnam had proven to be very expensive. In South Korea, 20,000 of the 61,000 U.S. troops stationed there were withdrawn by June 1971.

The application of the Nixon Doctrine "opened the floodgates" of U.S. military aid to allies in the Persian Gulf. That in turn helped set the stage for the Carter Doctrine and for subsequent direct military involvement in the Gulf War and the Iraq War.

== Contemporary usage ==
Scholar Walter Ladwig argued in 2012 that the United States should adopt a "neo-Nixon doctrine" towards the Indian Ocean region, in which the U.S. would sponsor key local partners—India, Indonesia, Australia, and South Africa—to assume the primary burden for upholding regional peace and security. A key shortcoming of the original Nixon Doctrine, Ladwig argues, was its reliance on pro-Western autocrats who proved to be a poor foundation for an enduring regional security structure. In contrast, his "neo-Nixon Doctrine" would focus on cultivating the major Indian Ocean nations that are democratic and financially capable of being net providers of security in the region. Although crediting this idea for the "reasonable balance it strikes between US leadership and local initiative", Andrew Philips of the Australian Strategic Policy Institute has suggested the idea overstates "the degree of convergent security interests between its four presumptive sub-regional lynchpin states."
