= Carter Doctrine =

1980 U.S. foreign policy

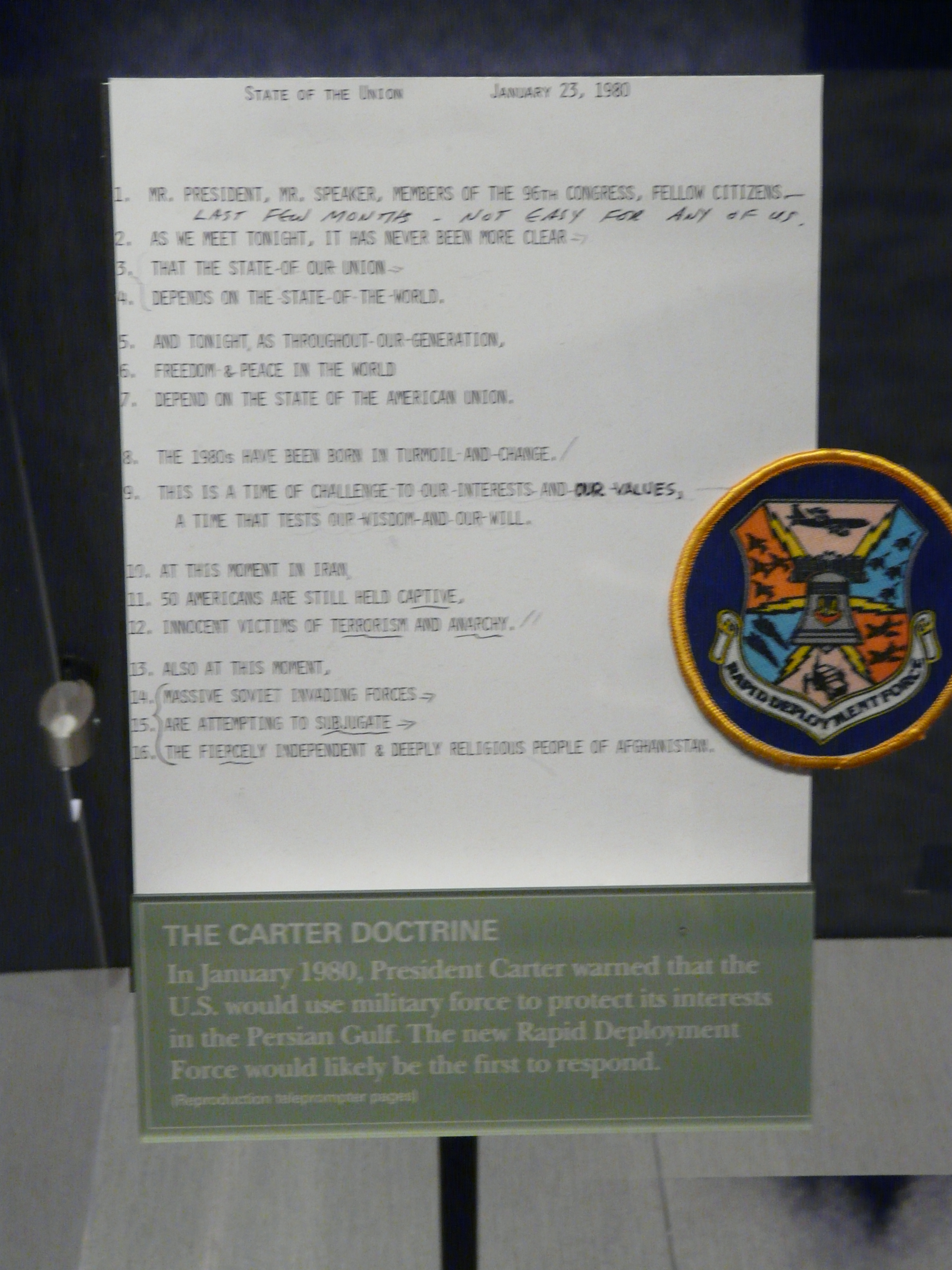
Document related to the Carter Doctrine

The Carter Doctrine was a policy proclaimed by United States president Jimmy Carter in his State of the Union Address on January 23, 1980, which stated that the U.S. would use military force, if necessary, to defend its national interests in the Persian Gulf. It was a response to the Soviet Union's intervention in Afghanistan in 1979, and it was intended to deter the Soviet Union, the country's Cold War adversary, from seeking hegemony in the Persian Gulf region.

The following key sentence, written by Zbigniew Brzezinski, Carter's National Security Adviser, concludes the section:

Let our position be absolutely clear: An attempt by any outside force to gain control of the Persian Gulf region will be regarded as an assault on the vital interests of the United States of America, and such an assault will be repelled by any means necessary, including military force.

Brzezinski modeled the wording on the Truman Doctrine, and insisted the sentence be included in the speech "to make it very clear that the Soviets should stay away from the Persian Gulf."

In The Prize: The Epic Quest for Oil, Money, and Power, author Daniel Yergin notes that the Carter Doctrine "bore striking similarities" to a 1903 British declaration in which British Foreign Secretary Lord Lansdowne warned Russia and Germany that the British would "regard the establishment of a naval base or of a fortified port in the Persian Gulf by any other power as a very grave menace to British interests, and we should certainly resist it with all the means at our disposal."

== Background ==
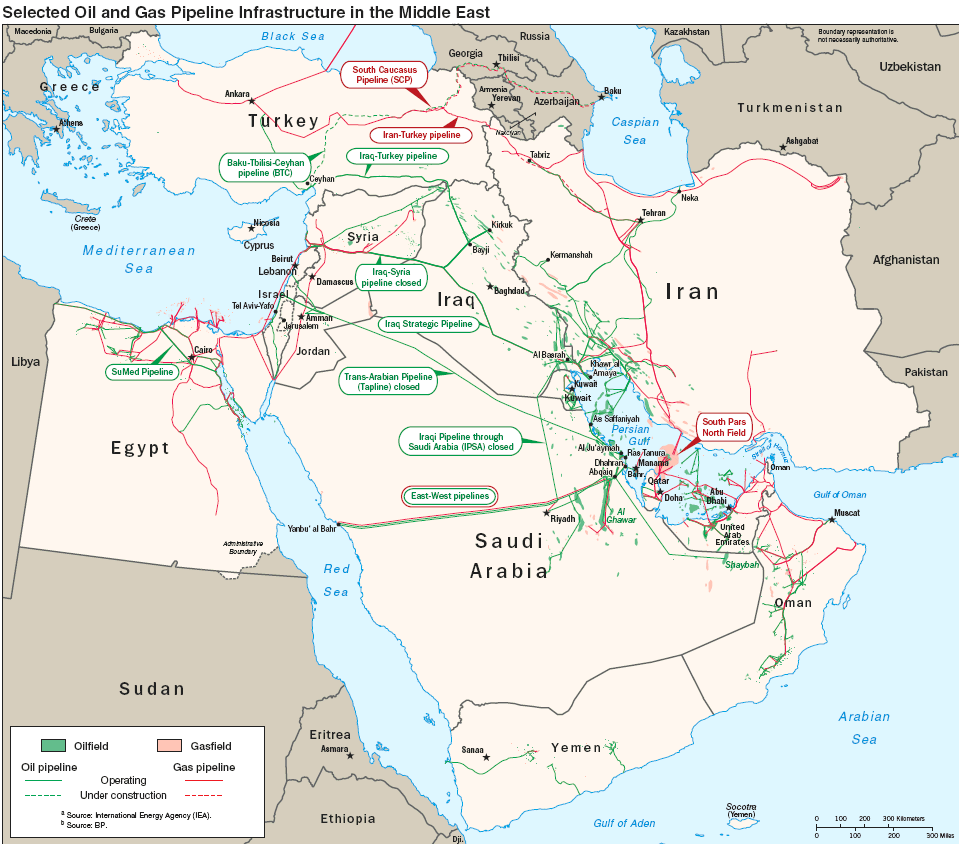
Oil and gas resources in the Persian Gulf region

The Persian Gulf region was first proclaimed to be of national interest to the United States during World War II. Petroleum is centrally important to modern armies. The U.S., the world's leading oil producer at the time, supplied most of the oil for the Allied armies. Many American strategists were concerned that the war would dangerously reduce the country's oil supply and so they sought to establish good relations with Saudi Arabia, a kingdom with large oil reserves. On February 16, 1943, U.S. president Franklin D. Roosevelt stated that, "the defense of Saudi Arabia is vital to the defense of the United States."

On February 14, 1945, while returning from the Yalta Conference, Roosevelt met with Saudi king Ibn Saud on the Great Bitter Lake in the Suez Canal, the first time a U.S. president had visited the Persian Gulf. During Operation Desert Shield in 1990, U.S. defense secretary Dick Cheney cited the landmark meeting between Roosevelt and Ibn Saud as one of the justifications for sending troops to protect Saudi Arabia's border.

In World War II, Britain and the Soviet Union had jointly invaded and partitioned Iran in 1941 which was to end with the conclusion of the war. However, Soviet-aligned rebellions, the Azerbaijan People's Government and Republic of Mahabad, created a crisis in the Allied occupation zone, the Iran crisis of 1946, which was one of the first struggles of the Cold War. U.S. pressure on the Soviets to withdraw from Iran was one of the first postwar conflicts between the two superpowers.

The Persian Gulf was still regarded as an area of vital importance to the U.S. during the Cold War. Three Cold War American presidential doctrines (the Truman, Eisenhower, and Nixon Doctrines) played roles in forming the Carter Doctrine. The Truman Doctrine, which stated that the U.S. would send military aid to countries threatened by Soviet aggression, was used to strengthen both Iran and Saudi Arabia's security. In October 1950, President Harry S. Truman wrote to Ibn Saud that "the United States is interested in the preservation of the independence and territorial integrity of Saudi Arabia. No threat to your Kingdom could occur which would not be a matter of immediate concern to the United States."

The Eisenhower Doctrine called for U.S. troops to be sent to the Middle East to defend American allies against their Soviet-backed adversaries. Ultimately, the Nixon Doctrine's application provided military aid to Iran and Saudi Arabia so that U.S. allies could ensure peace and stability there. In 1979, the Iranian revolution and the Soviet invasion of Afghanistan prompted the restatement of U.S. interests in the region in the form of the Carter Doctrine. The Yemenite War of 1979, with Soviet support to South Yemen, may also have been a "smaller shock" contributing to the crisis of that year, and Carter's foreign policy shift. National Security Advisor Zbigniew Brzezinski advised Carter that the United States's "greatest vulnerability" lay on an arc "stretching from Chittagong through Islamabad to Aden." Henry Kissinger gave Carter similar advice.

In July 1979, responding to a national energy crisis that resulted from the Iranian revolution, Carter delivered his "Crisis of Confidence" speech, urging Americans to reduce their energy use to help lessen U.S. dependence on foreign oil supplies. In 2008, some scholars claimed that Carter's energy plan, had it been fully enacted, would have prevented some of the economic difficulties caused by American dependency on foreign oil.

The 1979 oil crisis also led to a vast surge in energy wealth for the oil-rich Soviet Union, which along the lines of resource curse literature, has been hypothesized to have caused the boldness of the Soviet Politburo in the intervention in Afghanistan in the first place. Previously, the Soviet Union's "Third World" strategy combined largely cautious support of revolutions with covert action. However, the invasion of Afghanistan indicated that Soviet policy had become more direct and belligerent. This was seen to advance a long-term Soviet geopolitical goal, the acquisition of strategic presence on the Indian Ocean, closer to the realm of possibility. This caused previous critics of containment policy to become some of its major supporters.

Over the course of January 1980 in response to the invasion, Carter withdrew the SALT II treaty from consideration before the Senate, recalled U.S. ambassador Thomas J. Watson from Moscow, curtailed grain sales to the Soviet Union, and suspended high-technology exports to the Soviet Union.

== Doctrine ==
Carter, in his State of the Union Address on January 23, 1980, after stating that Soviet troops in Afghanistan posed "a grave threat to the free movement of Middle East oil," proclaimed:

The region which is now threatened by Soviet troops in Afghanistan is of great strategic importance: It contains more than two-thirds of the world's exportable oil. The Soviet effort to dominate Afghanistan has brought Soviet military forces to within 300 miles of the Indian Ocean and close to the Straits of Hormuz, a waterway through which most of the world's oil must flow. The Soviet Union is now attempting to consolidate a strategic position, therefore, that poses a grave threat to the free movement of Middle East oil.

This situation demands careful thought, steady nerves, and resolute action, not only for this year but for many years to come. It demands collective efforts to meet this new threat to security in the Persian Gulf and in Southwest Asia. It demands the participation of all those who rely on oil from the Middle East and who are concerned with global peace and stability. And it demands consultation and close cooperation with countries in the area which might be threatened.

Meeting this challenge will take national will, diplomatic and political wisdom, economic sacrifice, and, of course, military capability. We must call on the best that is in us to preserve the security of this crucial region.

Let our position be absolutely clear: An attempt by any outside force to gain control of the Persian Gulf region will be regarded as an assault on the vital interests of the United States of America, and such an assault will be repelled by any means necessary, including military force.

== Implementation ==
The Carter administration began to build up the Rapid Deployment Force, which would eventually become CENTCOM. In the interim, the administration asked Congress to restart Selective Service registration, proposed a five percent increase in military spending for each of the next five years, and expanded U.S. naval presence in the Persian Gulf and the Indian Ocean.

A negative response came from retired strategist and diplomat George F. Kennan. U.S. senator Ted Kennedy charged that Carter had overreacted, exaggerated the Soviet threat, and failed to act diplomatically. Kennedy repeated these allegations during his 1980 Democratic presidential primary bid, in which he was defeated.

Carter's successor, Ronald Reagan, extended the policy in October 1981 with what is sometimes called the "Reagan Corollary to the Carter Doctrine," which proclaimed that the United States would intervene to protect Saudi Arabia, whose security was believed to be threatened during the Iran–Iraq War. Thus, while the Carter Doctrine warned away outside forces from the region, the Reagan Corollary pledged to secure internal stability. According to diplomat Howard Teicher, "with the enunciation of the Reagan Corollary, the policy groundwork was laid for Operation Desert Storm."

While framed as a Cold War policy, the Carter Doctrine aimed to support U.S. grand strategy by ensuring the security of Israel, which was recognized by the U.S. on May 14, 1948. During the Cold War, Israel was an important ally in countering Soviet influence in the region. In the post-Cold War era, the U.S. has continued to provide significant assistance to Israel, focusing on maintaining its Qualitative Military Edge (QME) and promoting stability with neighboring countries.

== Legacy ==
The U.S. presence in the Middle East for over three decades was supported by a chain of military bases across the Gulf states. This persisted until the 2026 U.S.-Israeli strikes on Iran, when Iran attacked these U.S. facilities with short-range missiles and drones causing extensive damage and forcing the U.S. to largely withdraw from these bases. U.S. forces were moved to Israel and Jordan beyond the range of Iranian short-range missiles and drones, with some U.S. aircraft and drones moved to bases in Europe. The American Enterprise Institute estimated the costs of repairing eleven major U.S. bases in seven Gulf states would be about $5 billion.

Pentagon planners have reconsidered the strategy, preferring a more dispersed deployment that makes it harder to target U.S. forces. U.S. Central Command experimented with spreading the army in smaller combat outposts and moving military aircraft quickly around temporary-use runways. The U.S. Fifth Fleet used the distant Naval Support Facility Diego Garcia as a temporary supply hub instead of its damaged headquarters in Bahrain.

No firm decision on rebuilding the bases to support the Carter doctrine has been made as of 2026.

== See also ==
- Iran–United States relations
- Reagan Doctrine
