= History of U.S. foreign policy, 1913–1933 =

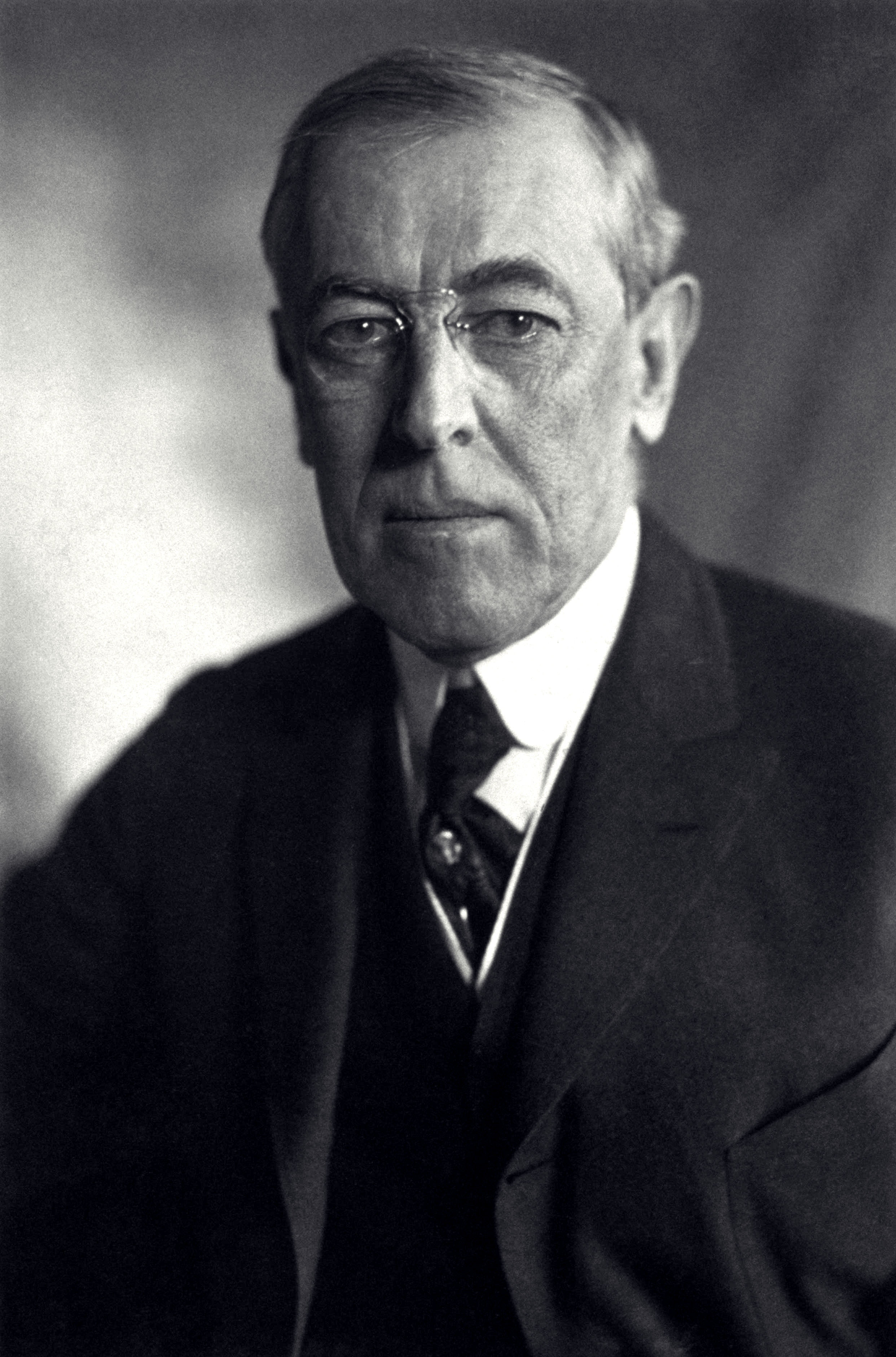
President Woodrow Wilson directed U.S. foreign policy from 1913 to 1921

The history of U.S. foreign policy from 1913–1933 covers the foreign policy of the United States during World War I and much of the Interwar period. The administrations of Presidents Woodrow Wilson, Warren G. Harding, Calvin Coolidge, and Herbert Hoover successively handled U.S. foreign policy during this period.

Wilson initially sought to remain neutral in World War I, but in 1917 he led the United States into the war on the side of the Allied Powers of Britain, France, and other countries. In 1918, Germany sued for peace, and Wilson was one of the key Allied leaders at the post-war Paris Peace Conference. He advocated for the option of his "Fourteen Points", which called for the establishment of "an organized common peace" that would help prevent future conflicts. Other Allied leaders pushed back against some of Wilson's goals, but the Allied leaders agreed to join the newly-formed League of Nations. In the United States, Senator Henry Cabot Lodge led a successful effort to prevent ratification of the Treaty of Versailles, and the treaty remained unratified when Wilson left office.

Campaigning against Wilson's policies, Harding won election in 1920 and took office in 1921. Harding repudiated the Treaty of Versailles, and the United States never joined the League. Secretary of State Charles Evans Hughes led the negotiations that resulted in the 1922 Washington Naval Treaty, under which the major naval powers agreed to avoid a naval arms race. Efforts for disarmament would continue after 1922, leading to the signing of the 1930 London Naval Treaty. European war debts and reparations also emerged as a major issue in the 1920s; the U.S. consistently refused to forgive the debts, but Harding, Coolidge, and Hoover all reached agreements to lower the burden of debts on various European countries. Coolidge's main foreign policy initiative was the Kellogg–Briand Pact, under which the signatories agreed to renounce war as an "instrument of national policy". The Great Depression began during Hoover's tenure, leaving the worldwide economy in crisis. In the midst of the depression, Japan invaded Manchuria and Adolf Hitler came to power in Germany.

In Latin America, Wilson emulated his predecessors in sending soldiers to support U.S.-backed governments, but Hoover eventually wound down the "Banana Wars". The U.S. became involved in the Mexican Revolution during Wilson's presidency, and Mexico would remain a foreign policy issue throughout the 1920s. After the October Revolution, Wilson dispatched American soldiers to Russia in as part of a broader Allied intervention. Russia was succeeded by the Soviet Union in 1922, and the United States would refuse to extend diplomatic recognition to the Soviet Union until 1933.

== Leadership ==
=== Wilson administration ===
Democrat Woodrow Wilson made all the major foreign policy decisions as president, from 1913 to his mental breakdown in late 1919. Other key foreign policy figures in the Wilson administration include Secretary of State William Jennings Bryan, and "Colonel" Edward M. House, Wilson's key foreign policy adviser until 1919. Bryan resigned in 1915 due to his opposition to Wilson hard line's towards Germany in the aftermath of the Sinking of the RMS Lusitania and was replaced by Robert Lansing.

Wilson's foreign policy was based on his idealistic approach to liberal internationalism that sharply contrasted with realist conservative nationalism of William Howard Taft, Theodore Roosevelt, and William McKinley. Since 1900, the consensus of Democrats had, according to Arthur Link:

consistently condemned militarism, imperialism, and interventionism in foreign policy. They instead advocated world involvement along liberal-internationalist lines. Wilson's appointment of William Jennings Bryan as Secretary of State indicated a new departure, for Bryan had long been the leading opponent of imperialism and militarism and a pioneer in the world peace movement.

=== Harding administration ===
Republican Warren G. Harding was president from March 1921 until his death in August 1923. Harding selected former Supreme Court Justice and 1916 Republican presidential nominee Charles Evans Hughes as his Secretary of State. Harding made it clear when he appointed Hughes as Secretary of State that the former justice would run foreign policy, a change from Wilson's close management of international affairs, though Hughes did have to work within some broad outlines set by the president. Harding and Hughes frequently communicated, and the president remained well-informed regarding the state of foreign affairs, but he rarely overrode any of Hughes's decisions.

==== European relations ====
By the time Harding took office, several new European states had been established in the Aftermath of World War I

Harding took office less than two years after the end of World War I, and his administration faced several issues in the aftermath of that conflict. Harding made it clear when he appointed Hughes as Secretary of State that the former justice would run foreign policy, a change from Wilson's close management of international affairs. Harding and Hughes frequently communicated, and the president remained well-informed regarding the state of foreign affairs, but he rarely overrode any of Hughes's decisions. Hughes did have to work within some broad outlines; after taking office, Harding hardened his stance on the League of Nations, deciding the U.S. would not join even a scaled-down version of the League.

With the Treaty of Versailles unratified by the Senate, the U.S. remained technically at war with Germany, Austria, and Hungary. Peacemaking began with the Knox–Porter Resolution, declaring the U.S. at peace and reserving any rights granted under Versailles. Treaties with Germany, Austria and Hungary, each containing many of the non-League provisions of the Treaty of Versailles, were ratified in 1921. This still left the question of relations between the U.S. and the League. Hughes' State Department initially ignored communications from the League, or tried to bypass it through direct communications with member nations. By 1922, though, the U.S., through its consul in Geneva, was dealing with the League. The U.S. refused to participate in any League meeting with political implications, but it sent observers to sessions on technical and humanitarian matters. Harding stunned the capital when he sent to the Senate a message supporting the participation of the U.S. in the proposed Permanent Court of International Justice (also known as the "World Court"). His proposal was not favorably received by most senators, and a resolution supporting U.S. membership in the World Court was drafted and promptly buried in the Foreign Affairs Committee.

By the time Harding took office, there were calls from foreign governments for the reduction of the massive war debt owed to the United States, and the German government sought to reduce the reparations that it was required to pay. The U.S. refused to consider any multilateral settlement. Harding sought passage of a plan proposed by Mellon to give the administration broad authority to reduce war debts in negotiation, but Congress, in 1922, passed a more restrictive bill. Hughes negotiated an agreement for Britain to pay off its war debt over 62 years at low interest, effectively reducing the present value of the obligations. This agreement, approved by Congress in 1923, set a pattern for negotiations with other nations. Talks with Germany on reduction of reparations payments would result in the Dawes Plan of 1924.

During World War I, the U.S. had been among the nations that had sent troops to Russia after the Russian Revolution. Afterwards, President Wilson refused to provide diplomatic recognition to Russia, which was led by a Communist government following the October Revolution. Commerce Secretary Hoover, with considerable experience of Russian affairs, took the lead on Russian policy. He supported aid to and trade with Russia, fearing U.S. companies would be frozen out of the Soviet market. When famine struck Russia in 1921, Hoover had the American Relief Administration, which he had headed, negotiate with the Russians to provide aid. According to historian George Herring, the American relief effort may have saved as many as 10 million people from starvation. U.S. businessman such as Armand Hammer invested in the Russian economy, but many of these investments failed due to various Russian restrictions on trade and commerce. Russian and (after the 1922 establishment of the Soviet Union) Soviet leaders hoped that these economic and humanitarian connections would lead to recognition of their government, but Communism's extreme unpopularity in the U.S. precluded this possibility.

==== Disarmament ====
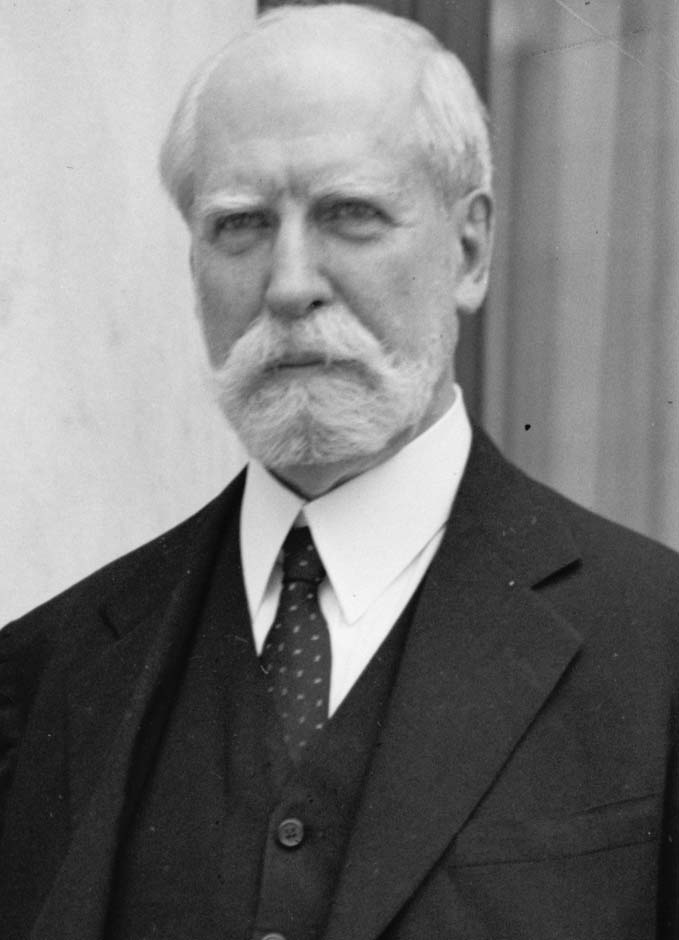
Charles Evans Hughes, former Supreme Court Justice and Harding's Secretary of State

At the end of World War I, the United States had the largest navy and one of the largest armies in the world. With no serious threat to the United States itself, Harding and his successors presided over the disarmament of the navy and the army. The army shrank to 140,000 men, while naval reduction was based on a policy of parity with Britain. Seeking to prevent an arms race, Senator William Borah won passage of a congressional resolution calling for a 50 percent reduction of the American Navy, the British Navy, and the Japanese Navy. With Congress's backing, Harding and Hughes began preparations to hold a naval disarmament conference in Washington. The Washington Naval Conference convened in November 1921, with representatives from the U.S., Japan, Britain, France, Italy, China, Belgium, the Netherlands, and Portugal. Secretary of State Hughes assumed a primary role in the conference and made the pivotal proposal—the U.S. would reduce its number of warships by 30 if Great Britain decommissioned 19 ships and Japan decommissioned 17 ships. A journalist covering the conference wrote that "Hughes sank in thirty-five minutes more ships than all of the admirals of the world have sunk in a cycle of centuries."

The conference produced six treaties and twelve resolutions among the participating nations, which ranged from limiting the tonnage of naval ships to custom tariffs. The United States, Britain, Japan, and France reached the Four-Power Treaty, in which each country agreed to respect the territorial integrity of one another in the Pacific Ocean. Those four powers as well as Italy also reached the Washington Naval Treaty, which established a ratio of battleship tonnage that each country agreed to respect. In the Nine-Power Treaty, each signatory agreed to respect the Open Door Policy in China, and Japan agreed to return Shandong to China. The treaties only remained in effect until the mid-1930s, however, and ultimately failed. Japan eventually invaded Manchuria and the arms limitations no longer had any effect. The building of "monster warships" resumed and the U.S. and Great Britain were unable to quickly rearm themselves to defend an international order and stop Japan from remilitarizing.

==== Latin America ====
Intervention in Latin America had been a minor campaign issue; Harding spoke against Wilson's decision to send U.S. troops to the Dominican Republic, and attacked the Democratic vice presidential candidate, Franklin D. Roosevelt, for his role in the Haitian intervention. Secretary of State Hughes worked to improve relations with Latin American countries who were wary of the American use of the Monroe Doctrine to justify intervention; at the time of Harding's inauguration, the U.S. also had troops in Cuba and Nicaragua. The troops stationed in Cuba to protect American interests were withdrawn in 1921, but U.S. forces remained in the other three nations through Harding's presidency. In April 1921, Harding gained the ratification of the Thomson–Urrutia Treaty with Colombia, granting that nation $25,000,000 as settlement for the U.S.-provoked Panamanian revolution of 1903. The Latin American nations were not fully satisfied, as the U.S. refused to renounce interventionism, though Hughes pledged to limit it to nations near the Panama Canal and to make it clear what the U.S. aims were.

The U.S. had intervened repeatedly in Mexico under Wilson, and had withdrawn diplomatic recognition, setting conditions for reinstatement. The Mexican government under President Álvaro Obregón wanted recognition before negotiations, but Wilson and his final Secretary of State, Bainbridge Colby, refused. Both Hughes and Secretary of the Interior Fall opposed recognition; Hughes instead sent a draft treaty to the Mexicans in May 1921, which included pledges to reimburse Americans for losses in Mexico since the 1910 revolution there. Obregón was unwilling to sign a treaty before being recognized, and he worked to improve the relationship between American businesses and Mexico, reaching agreement with creditors and mounting a public relations campaign in the United States. This had its effect, and by mid-1922, Fall was less influential than he had been, lessening the resistance to recognition. The two presidents appointed commissioners to reach a deal, and the U.S. recognized the Obregón government on August 31, 1923, just under a month after Harding's death, substantially on the terms proffered by Mexico.

=== Coolidge administration ===
Vice President Calvin Coolidge, a Republican, succeeded Harding following his death in August 1923 and won election in a landslide to a full term in 1924, serving until he retired in 1929. Secretary of State Charles Evans Hughes directed foreign policy until he resigned in early 1925. He was replaced by Frank B. Kellogg, who had previously served as a senator and as the ambassador to Great Britain. Other prominent Cabinet officials include Secretary of the Treasury Andrew Mellon and Secretary of Commerce Herbert Hoover, both of whom had served in the Harding administration.

=== Hoover administration ===
Republican Herbert Hoover, who served as Secretary of Commerce from 1921 to 1928, succeeded Coolidge after winning the 1928 presidential election. As the third consecutive Republican president to take office, Hoover retained many of the previous administration's personnel, including Secretary of the Treasury Andrew Mellon Henry Stimson, the Governor-General of the Philippines and a former Secretary of War, became Hoover's Secretary of State. In late October 1929, the Stock Market Crash of 1929 occurred, and the worldwide economy began to spiral downward into the Great Depression. In the midst of a worldwide depression, Hoover and Secretary of State Henry Stimson became more closely involved in world affairs than Hoover's Republican predecessors had been. According to William Leuchtenburg, Hoover was "the last American president to take office with no conspicuous need to pay attention to the rest of the world." But during Hoover's term, the world order established with the 1919 Treaty of Versailles began to crumble.

== World War I, 1914–1918 ==
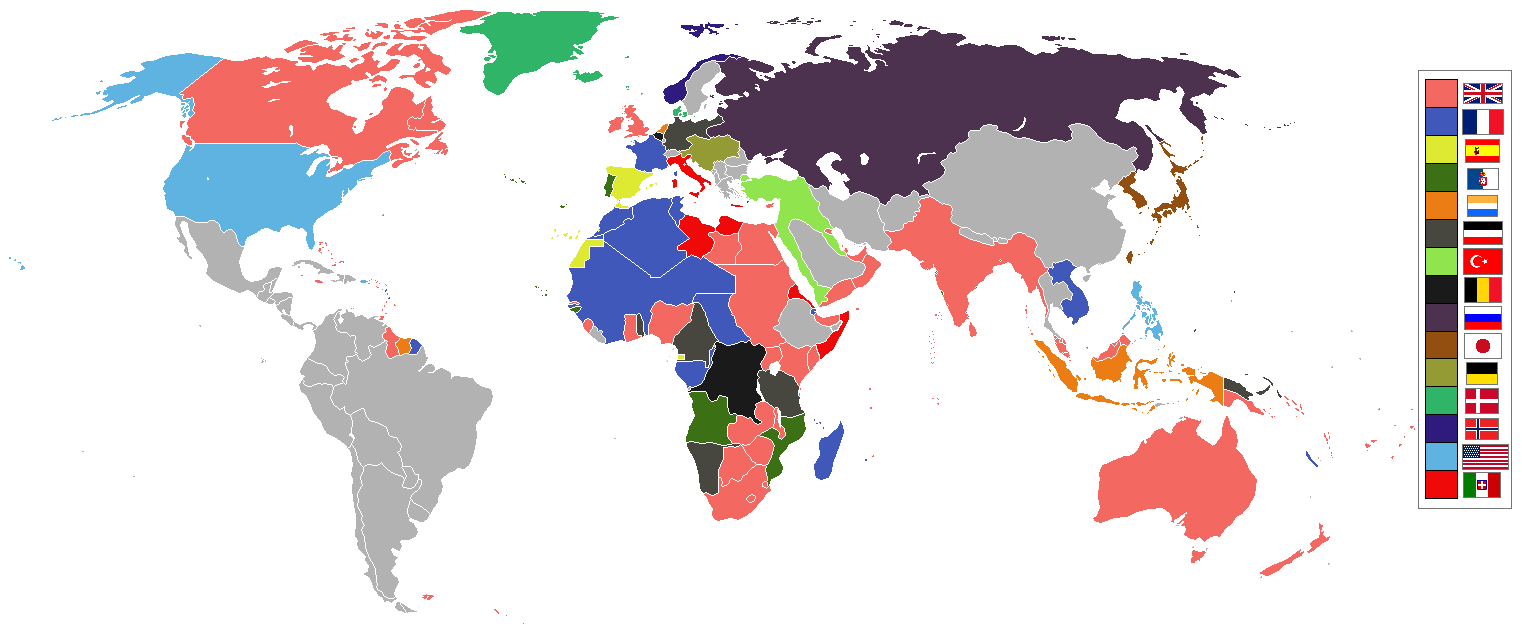
Map of the great powers and other selected countries in 1914

=== Neutrality in World War I ===
World War I broke out in July 1914, pitting the Central Powers (Germany, Austria-Hungary, the Ottoman Empire, and Bulgaria) against the Allied Powers (Great Britain, France, Russia, and several other countries). The war fell into a long stalemate after the German advance was halted in September 1914 at the First Battle of the Marne. From 1914 until early 1917, Wilson's primary foreign policy objective was to keep the United States out of the war in Europe. Wilson insisted that all government actions be neutral, and that the belligerents must respect that neutrality according to the norms of international law. After the war began, Wilson told the Senate that the United States, "must be impartial in thought as well as in action, must put a curb upon our sentiments as well as upon every transaction that might be construed as a preference of one party to the struggle before another." He was ambiguous whether he meant the United States as a nation or meant all Americans as individuals. Though Wilson was determined to keep the United States out of the war, and he thought that the causes of the war were complex, he personally believed that the U.S. shared more values with the Allies than the Central Powers.

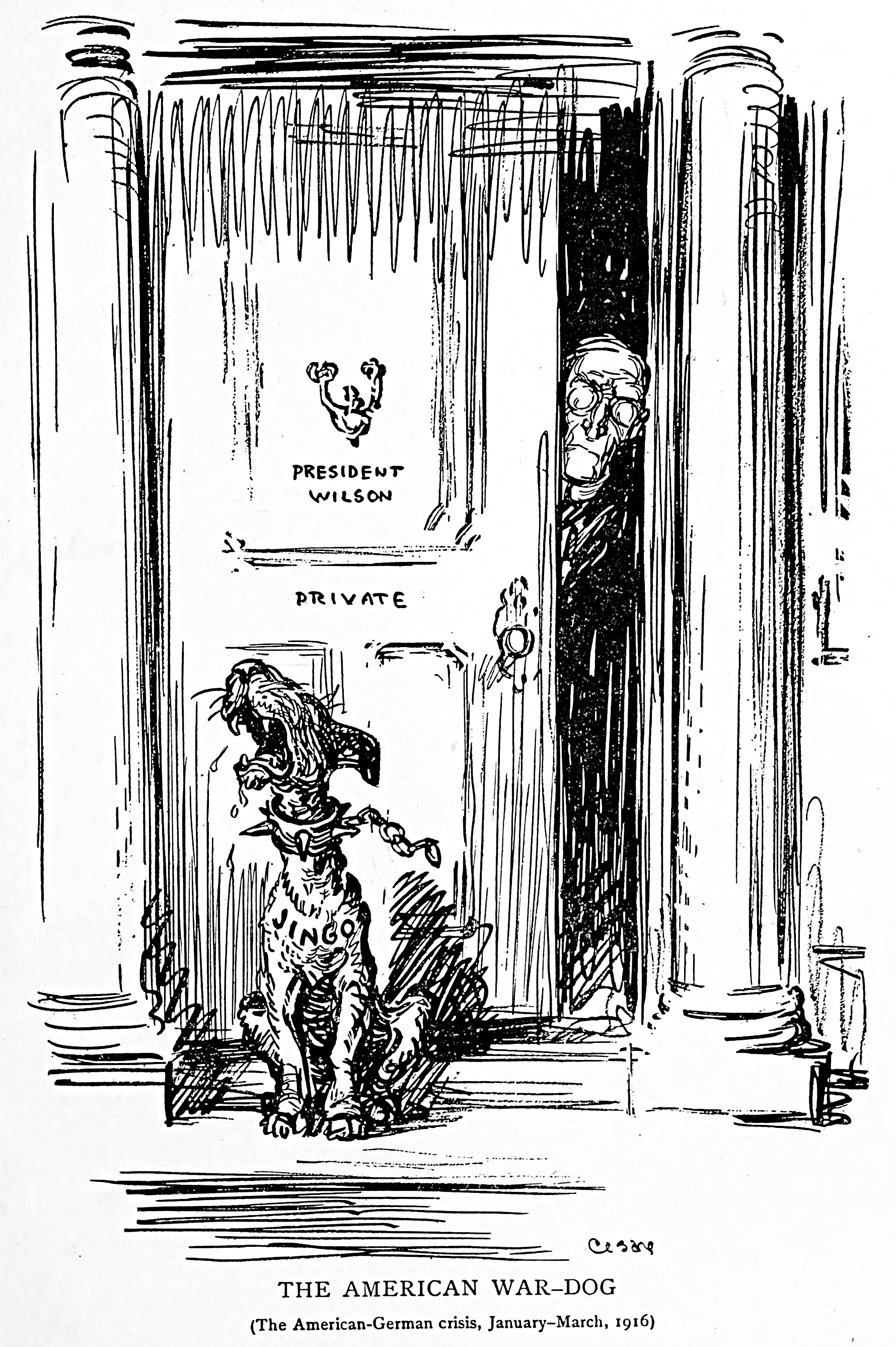
Wilson and "Jingo", the American War Dog. The editorial cartoon ridicules jingoes baying for war.

Wilson and House sought to position the United States as a mediator in the conflict, but European leaders rejected Houses's offers to help end the conflict. At the urging of Bryan, Wilson also discouraged American companies from extending loans to belligerents. The policy hurt the Allies more than the Central Powers, since the Allies were more dependent on American goods. The administration relaxed the policy of discouraging loans in October 1914 and then ended it in October 1915 due to fears about the policy's effect on the American economy. The United States sought to trade with both the Allied Powers and the Central Powers, but the British attempted to impose a Blockade of Germany, and, after a period of negotiations, Wilson essentially assented to the British blockade. The U.S. had relatively little direct trade with the Central Powers, and Wilson was unwilling to wage war against Britain over trade issues. The British also made their blockade more acceptable to American leaders by buying, rather than seizing without compensation, intercepted goods. Many Germans viewed American trade with the Allies as decidedly unneutral.

==== Growing tensions ====
In response to the British blockade of the Central Powers, the Germans launched a submarine campaign against merchant vessels in the seas surrounding the British Isles. Wilson strongly protested the policy, which had a much stronger effect on American trade than the British blockade. In the March 1915 Thrasher incident, a German submarine sank the British merchant ship Falaba with the loss of 111 lives, including one American. In early 1915, a German bomb struck an American ship, the Cushing, and a German submarine torpedoed an American tanker, the Gulflight. Wilson took the view, based on some reasonable evidence, that both incidents were accidental, and that a settlement of claims could be postponed to the end of the war. A German submarine torpedoed and sank the British ocean liner RMS Lusitania in May 1915; over a thousand perished, including many Americans. Wilson did not call for war; instead he said, "There is such a thing as a man being too proud to fight. There is such a thing as a nation being so right that it does not need to convince others by force that it is right". He realized he had chosen the wrong words when critics lashed out at his rhetoric. Wilson sent a protest to Germany which demanded that the German government "take immediate steps to prevent the recurrence" of incidents like the sinking of the Lusitania. In response, Bryan, who believed that Wilson had placed the defense of American trade rights above neutrality, resigned from the cabinet.

The White Star liner Arabic was torpedoed in August 1915, with two American casualties. The U.S. threatened a diplomatic break unless Germany repudiated the action. The Germans agreed to warn unarmed merchant ships before attacking them. In March 1916 Sussex, an unarmed French-registered ferry, was torpedoed in the English Channel and four Americans were among the dead; the Germans had flouted the post-Lusitania exchanges. Wilson drew praise when he succeeded in wringing from Germany a pledge to constrain submarine warfare to the rules of cruiser warfare. This was a clear departure from existing practices—a diplomatic concession from which Germany could only more brazenly withdraw. In January 1917, the Germans initiated a new policy of unrestricted submarine warfare against ships in the seas around the British Isles. German leaders knew that the policy would likely provoke U.S. entrance into the war, but they hoped to defeat the Allied Powers before the U.S. could fully mobilize.

==== Preparedness ====
Military "preparedness," or building up the small army and navy—became a major dynamic of public opinion. New, well-funded organizations sprang up to appeal to the grassroots, including the American Defense Society (ADS) and the National Security League, both of which favored entering the war on the side of the Allies. Interventionists, led by Theodore Roosevelt, wanted war with Germany and attacked Wilson's refusal to build up the U.S. Army in anticipation of war. Wilson resistance to preparedness was partly due to the powerful anti-war element of the Democratic Party, which was led by Bryan. Anti-war sentiment was strong among many groups inside and outside of the party, including women, Protestant churches, labor unions, and Southern Democrats like Claude Kitchin, chairman of the powerful House Ways and Means Committee. Biographer John Morton Blum says:

Wilson's long silence about preparedness had permitted such a spread and such a hardening of antipreparedness attitudes within his party and across the nation that when he came in at late last to his task, neither Congress to the country was amenable to much persuasion.

After the sinking of the Lusitania and the resignation of Bryan, Wilson publicly committed himself to preparedness and began to build up the army and the navy. Wilson was constrained by America's traditional commitment to military nonintervention. Wilson believed that a massive military mobilization could only take place after a declaration of war, even though that meant a long delay in sending troops to Europe. Many Democrats felt that no American soldiers would be needed, only American money and munitions. Wilson had more success in his request for a dramatic expansion of the Navy. Congress passed a Naval Expansion Act in 1916 that encapsulated the planning by the Navy's professional officers to build a fleet of top-rank status, but it would take several years to become operational.

=== Entering the war ===
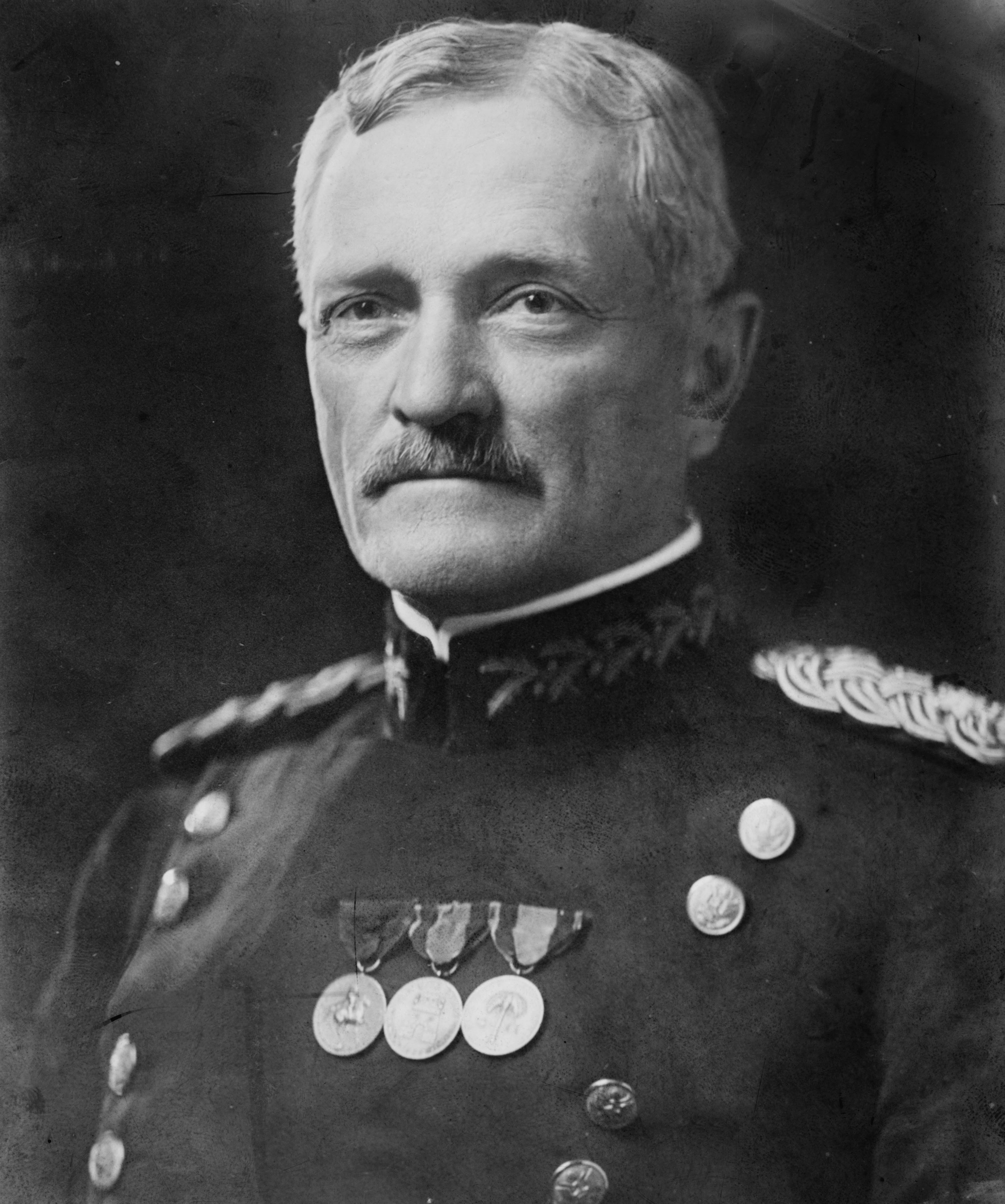
Gen. John J. Pershing

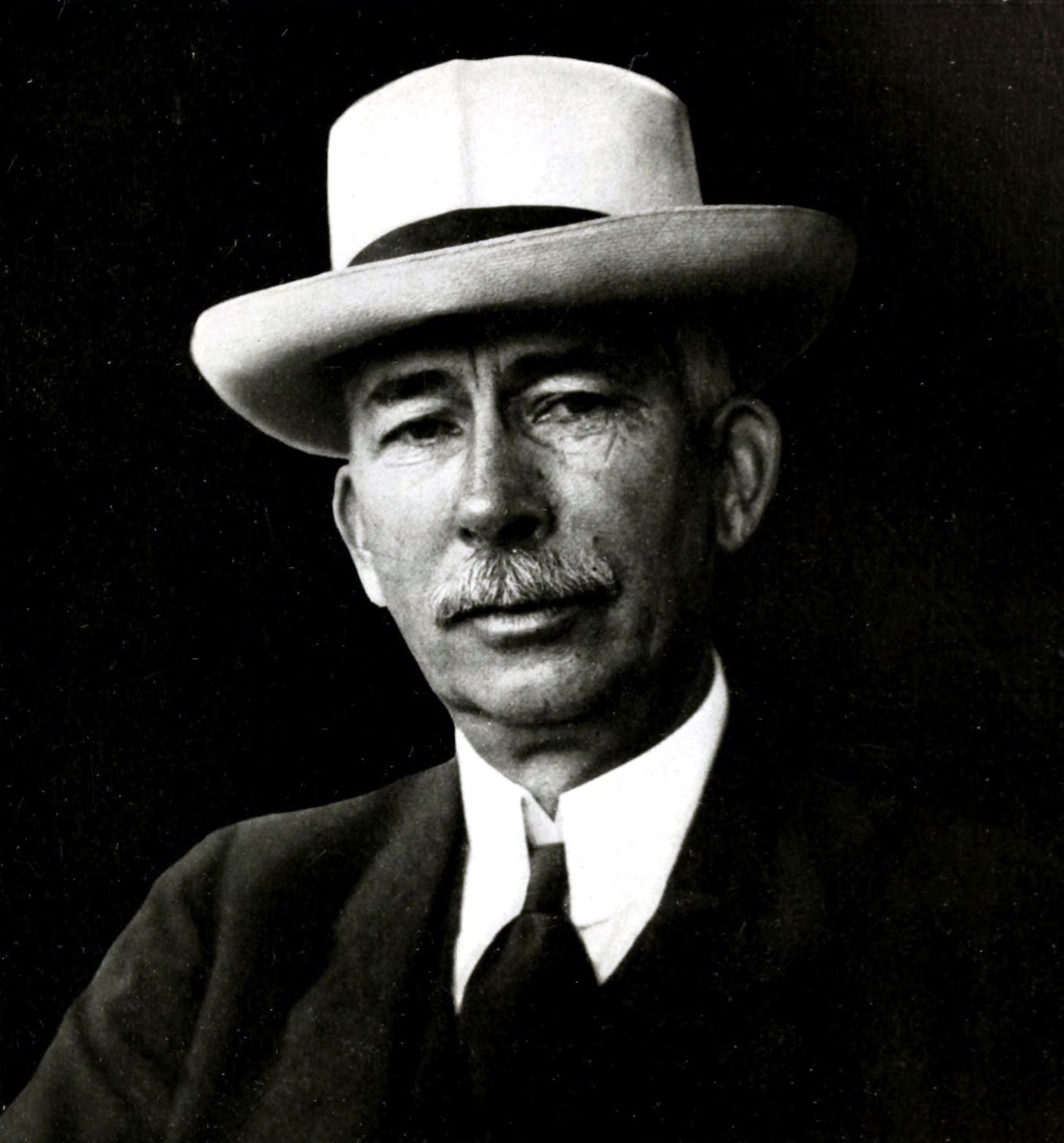
Colonel Edward M. House

In early 1917, German ambassador Johann von Bernstorf informed Secretary of State Lansing of Germany's commitment to unrestricted submarine warfare. In late February, the U.S. public learned of the Zimmermann Telegram, a secret diplomatic communication in which Germany sought to convince Mexico to join it in a war against the United States. Wilson's reaction after consulting the Cabinet and with Congress was a minimal one—that diplomatic relations with the Germans be brought to a halt. The president said, "We are the sincere friends of the German people and earnestly desire to remain at peace with them. We shall not believe they are hostile to us unless or until we are obliged to believe it". After a series of attacks on American ships, Wilson held a Cabinet meeting on March 20; all Cabinet members agreed that the time had come for the United States to enter the war. Wilson called Congress into a special session, which would begin on April 2.

March 1917 also brought the first of two revolutions in Russia, which impacted the strategic role of the U.S. in the war. The overthrow of the imperial government removed a serious barrier to America's entry into the European conflict, while the second revolution in November relieved the Germans of a major threat on their eastern front, and allowed them to dedicate more troops to the Western front, thus making U.S. forces central to Allied success in battles of 1918. Wilson initially rebuffed pleas from the Allies to dedicate military resources to an intervention in Russia against the Bolsheviks, based partially on his experience from attempted intervention in Mexico; nevertheless he ultimately was convinced of the potential benefit and agreed to dispatch a limited force to assist the Allies on the eastern front.

Wilson addressed Congress on April 2, calling for a declaration of war against Germany. He argued that the Germans were engaged in "nothing less than war against the government and people of the United States." He asked for a military draft to raise the army, increased taxes to pay for military expenses, loans to Allied governments, and increased industrial and agricultural production. The declaration of war by the United States against Germany passed Congress by strong bipartisan majorities on April 6, 1917, with opposition from ethnic German strongholds and remote rural areas in the South. The United States would also later declare war against Austria-Hungary in December 1917. The U.S. did not sign a formal alliance with Britain or France but operated as an "associated" power—an informal ally with military cooperation through the Supreme War Council in London.

Generals Frederick Funston and Leonard Wood had been contenders for the command of American army forces in Europe, but Funston died just weeks before the United States entered the war, and Wilson distrusted Wood, who was a close ally of Theodore Roosevelt. Wilson instead gave command to General John J. Pershing, who had led the expedition against Pancho Villa. Pershing would have complete authority as to tactics, strategy, and some diplomacy. Edward House became the president's main channel of communication with the British government, and William Wiseman, a British naval attaché, was House's principal contact in England. Their personal relationship succeeded in serving the powers well, by overcoming strained relations in order to achieve essential understandings between the two governments. House also became the U.S. representative on the Allies' Supreme War Council.

=== The Fourteen Points ===
Wilson sought the establishment of "an organized common peace" that would help prevent future conflicts. In this goal, he was opposed not just by the Central Powers, but also the other Allied Powers, who, to various degrees, sought to win concessions and oppose a punitive peace agreement on the Central Powers. He initiated a secret study group named The Inquiry, directed by Colonel House, to prepare for post-war negotiations. The Inquiry's studies culminated in a speech by Wilson to Congress on January 8, 1918, wherein he articulated America's long term war objectives. It was the clearest expression of intention made by any of the belligerent nations. The speech, known as the Fourteen Points, was authored mainly by Walter Lippmann and projected Wilson's progressive domestic policies into the international arena. The first six points dealt with diplomacy, freedom of the seas, and settlement of colonial claims. Then territorial issues were addressed and the final point, the establishment of an association of nations to guarantee the independence and territorial integrity of all nations—a League of Nations. The address was translated into many languages for global dissemination.

Aside from post-war considerations, Wilson's Fourteen Points were motivated by several factors. Unlike some of the other Allied leaders, Wilson did not call for the total break-up of the Ottoman Empire or the Austro-Hungarian Empire. In offering a non-punitive peace to these nations as well as Germany, Wilson hoped to quickly began negotiations to end the war. Wilson's liberal pronouncements were also targeted at pacifistic and war-weary elements within the Allied countries, including the United States. Additionally, Wilson hoped to woo the Russians back into the war, although he failed in this goal.

=== Course of the war ===
With the U.S. entrance into the war, Wilson and Secretary of War Baker launched an expansion of the army, with the goal of creating a 300,000-member Regular Army, a 440,000-member National Guard, and a 500,000-member conscripted force known as the "National Army." Despite some resistance to conscription and to the commitment of American soldiers abroad, large majorities of both houses of Congress voted to impose conscription with the Selective Service Act of 1917. Seeking to avoid the draft riots of the Civil War, the bill established local draft boards that were charged with determining who should be drafted. By the end of the war, nearly 3 million men would be drafted. The Navy also saw tremendous expansion, and, at the urging of Admiral William Sims, focused on building anti-submarine vessels. Allied shipping losses dropped substantially due to U.S. contributions and a new emphasis on the convoy system.

The American Expeditionary Forces first arrived in France in mid-1917. Wilson and Pershing rejected the British and French proposal that American soldiers integrate into existing Allied units, giving the United States more freedom of action but requiring for the creation of new organizations and supply chains. There were only 175,000 American soldiers in Europe at the end of 1917, but by mid-1918 10,000 Americans were arriving in Europe per day. Russia exited the war after the March 1918 signing of the Treaty of Brest-Litovsk, allowing Germany to shift soldiers from the Eastern Front of the war. The Germans launched a Spring Offensive against the Allies that inflicted heavy casualties but failed to break the Allied line. Beginning in August, the Allies launched the Hundred Days Offensive that pushed back the exhausted German army.

By the end of September 1918, the German leadership no longer believed it could win the war. Recognizing that Wilson would be more likely to accept a peace deal from a democratic government, Kaiser Wilhelm II appointed a new government led by Prince Maximilian of Baden; Baden immediately sought an armistice with Wilson. In the exchange of notes, German and American leaders agreed to incorporate the Fourteen Points in the armistice; House then procured agreement from France and Britain, but only after threatening to conclude a unilateral armistice without them. Wilson ignored Pershing's plea to drop the armistice and instead demand an unconditional surrender by Germany. The Germans signed the Armistice of 11 November 1918, bringing an end to the fighting. Austria-Hungary had signed the Armistice of Villa Giusti eight days earlier, while the Ottoman Empire had signed the Armistice of Mudros in October.

== Aftermath of World War I, 1919–1921 ==
=== Paris Peace Conference ===
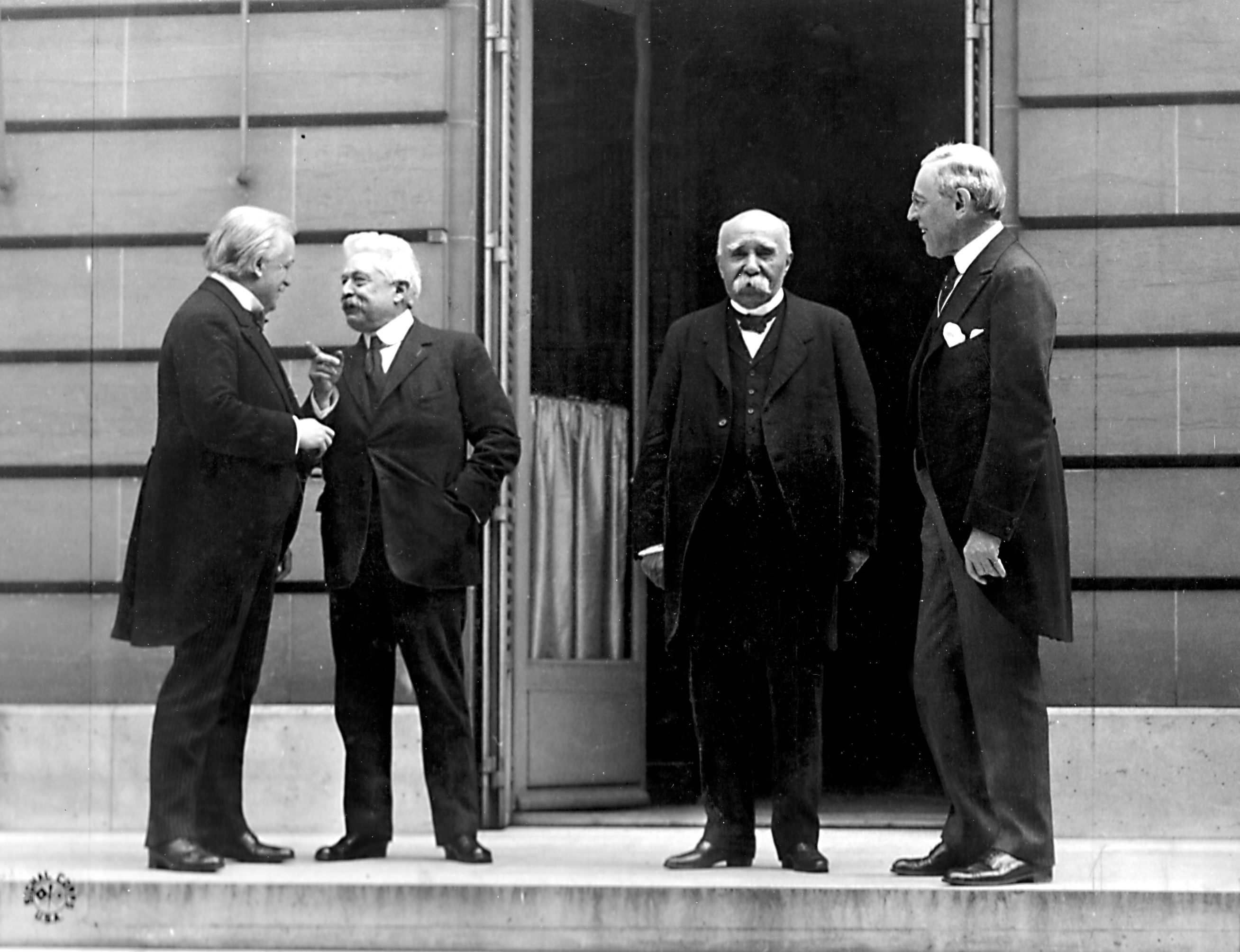
The "Big Four" at the Paris Peace Conference in 1919, following the end of World War I. Wilson is standing next to Georges Clemenceau at right.

After the signing of the armistice, Wilson traveled to Europe to attend the Paris Peace Conference, thereby becoming the first U.S. president to travel to Europe while in office. Greeted with large crowds on his arrival in Paris, Wilson was viewed as a revolutionary world leader who acted as an "apostle of liberty" that had travelled to Europe to ease the suffering of its citizens. Save for a two-week return to the United States, Wilson remained in Europe for six months, where he focused on reaching a peace treaty to formally end the war. The defeated Central Powers had not been invited to the conference, and anxiously awaited their fate. Wilson proposed that the competing factions of the Russian Civil War declare a truce and send a joint delegation to the Paris Peace Conference, but other Allied leaders opposed the proposal and no delegation was sent. Wilson, British Prime Minister David Lloyd George, French Prime Minister Georges Clemenceau, and Italian Prime Minister Vittorio Emanuele Orlando made up the "Big Four," the Allied leaders with the most influence at the Paris Peace Conference. Wilson held both idealistic and self-serving visions, as he hoped to create a new world order shaped around stability and democratic principles. There was huge emphasis put on his idea of 'self-determination', saying that people and nations should want to better themselves, as he strove for an anti-imperial future, freeing people from colonisation. Though Wilson continued to advocate his idealistic Fourteen Points, many of the other allies desired revenge. Clemenceau especially sought onerous terms for Germany, while Lloyd George supported some of Wilson's ideas but feared public backlash if the treaty proved too favorable to the Central Powers.

Several new European states were established at the Paris Peace Conference

In pursuit of his League of Nations, Wilson conceded several points to the other powers present at the conference. France pressed for the dismemberment of Germany and the payment of a huge sum in war reparations. Wilson resisted these ideas, but Germany was still required to pay war reparations and subjected to military occupation in the Rhineland. Additionally, a clause in the treaty specifically named Germany as responsible for the war. Wilson agreed to the creation of mandates in former German and Ottoman territories, allowing the European powers and Japan to establish de facto colonies in the Middle East, Africa, and Asia. The Japanese acquisition of German interests in the Shandong Peninsula of China proved especially unpopular, as it undercut Wilson's promise of self-government. However, Wilson won the creation of several new states in Central Europe and the Balkans, including Poland, Yugoslavia, and Czechoslovakia, and the Austro-Hungarian Empire and the Ottoman Empire were partitioned. Wilson refused to concede to Italy's demands for territory on the Adriatic coast, leading to a dispute between Yugoslavia and Italy that would not be settled until the signing of the 1920 Treaty of Rapallo. Japan proposed that the conference endorse a racial equality clause. Wilson was indifferent to the issue, but acceded to strong opposition from Australia and Britain.

The Covenant of the League of Nations was incorporated into the conference's Treaty of Versailles, which ended the war with Germany. Wilson himself presided over the committee that drafted the covenant, which bound members to oppose "external aggression" and to agree to peacefully settle disputes through organizations like the Permanent Court of International Justice. During the conference, former President Taft cabled to Wilson three proposed amendments to the League covenant which he thought would considerably increase its acceptability—the right of withdrawal from the League, the exemption of domestic issues from the League, and the inviolability of the Monroe Doctrine. Wilson very reluctantly accepted these amendments. In addition to the Treaty of Versailles, the Allies also wrote treaties with Austria (the Treaty of Saint-Germain-en-Laye), Hungary (the Treaty of Trianon), the Ottoman Empire (the Treaty of Sèvres), and Bulgaria (the Treaty of Neuilly-sur-Seine), all of which incorporated the League of Nations charter.

The conference finished negotiations in May 1919, at which point German leaders viewed the treaty for the first time. Some German leaders favored repudiating the treaty, but Germany signed the treaty on June 28, 1919. For his peace-making efforts, Wilson was awarded the 1919 Nobel Peace Prize. However, the defeated Central Powers protested the harsh terms of the treaty, and several colonial representatives pointed out the hypocrisy of a treaty that established new nations in Europe but allowed continued colonialism in Asia and Africa. Wilson also faced an uncertain domestic battle to ratify the treaty, as Republicans largely opposed it.

=== Treaty ratification debate ===
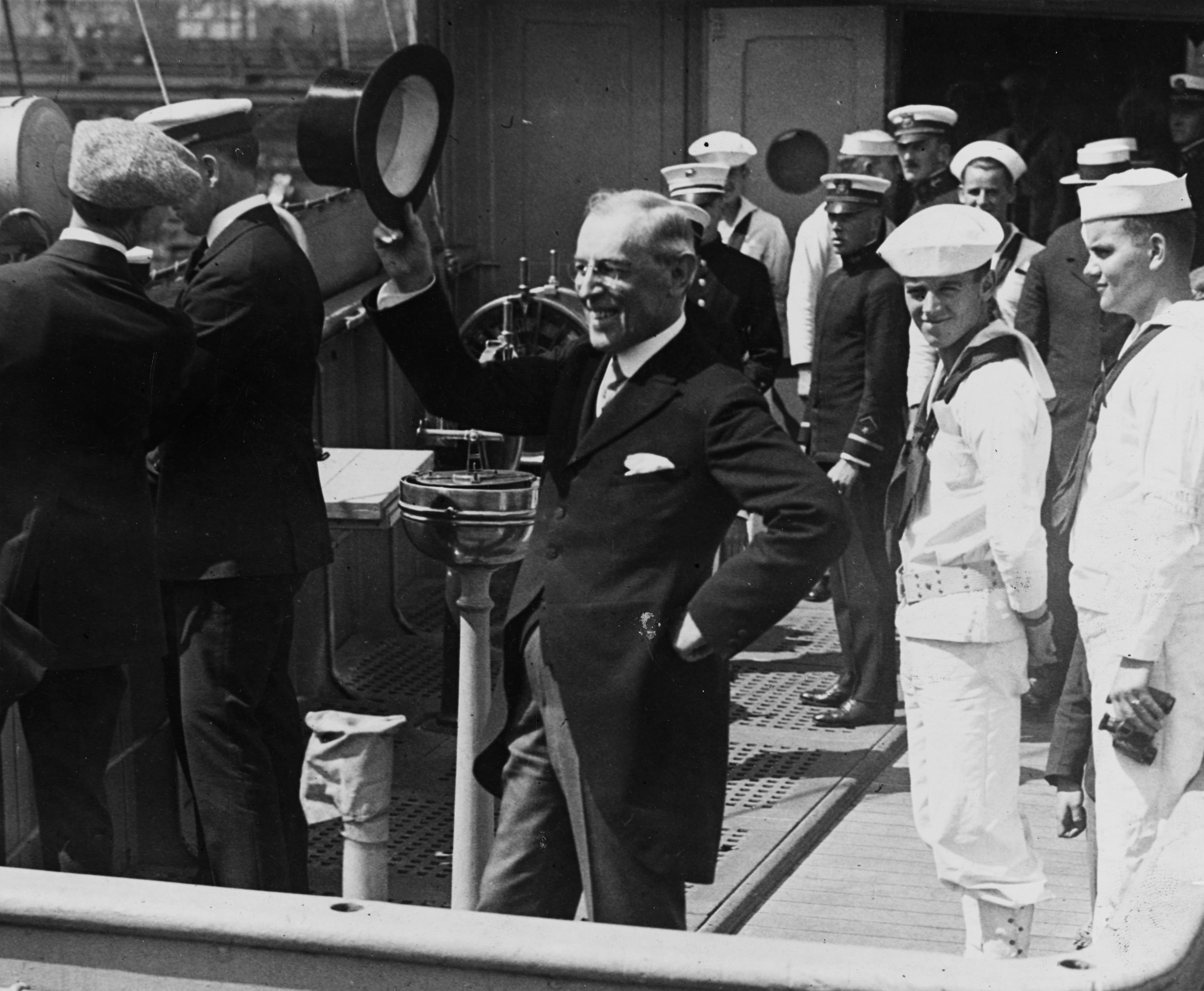
Wilson returning from the Versailles Peace Conference, 1919.

The chances were less than favorable for ratification of the treaty by a two-thirds vote of the Senate, in which Republicans held a narrow majority. Public opinion on the treaty was mixed, with intense opposition from most Republicans, Germans, and Irish Catholic Democrats. However, there was a general feeling of worry amongst the public due to the scale of destruction in Europe. Subsequently, public opinion slowly shifted against international involvement, and Americans became opposed to entanglement in international disputes, involving countries far from its borders. In numerous meetings with Senators, Wilson discovered opposition had hardened. Despite his weakened physical condition following the Paris Peace Conference, Wilson decided to barnstorm the Western states, scheduling 29 major speeches and many short ones to rally support. Wilson suffered a series of debilitating strokes and had to cut short his trip on in September 1919. He became an invalid in the White House, closely monitored by his wife, who insulated him from negative news and downplayed for him the gravity of his condition.

Senator Henry Cabot Lodge led the Republicans who wanted the Versailles Treaty with reservations, especially regarding the power of Congress to declare war. All Republicans were outraged by Wilson's refusal to discuss the war or its aftermath with them, or allow any prominent Republican (such as Taft) to participate at Versailles. A three-way battle developed in the Senate, as most Republicans supported a treaty with reservations, most Democrats supported it, and a group of a dozen "irreconcilables" were totally opposed to any League of Nations. The debate over the treaty centered around a debate over the American role in the world community in the post-war era, and Senators fell into three main groups. Most Democrats favored the treaty. Fourteen Senators, mostly Republicans with some Democrats, become known as the "irreconcilables," as they completely opposed U.S. entrance into the League of Nations. Some of these irreconcilables, such as George W. Norris, opposed the treaty for its failure to support decolonization and disarmament. Other irreconcilables, such as Hiram Johnson, feared surrendering American freedom of action to an international organization. Most sought the removal of Article X the League covenant, which purported to bind nations to defend each other against aggression. The remaining group of Republican Senators, known as "reservationists," accepted the idea of the league, but sought varying degrees of change to the League to ensure the protection of U.S. sovereignty. Former President Taft and former Secretary of State Elihu Root both favored ratification of the treaty with some modifications, and their public support for the treaty gave Wilson some chance of winning significant Republican support for ratification.

Despite the difficulty of winning ratification, Wilson consistently refused to accept any reservations. He did not want to re-open negotiations with the other powers if reservations were added.

In mid-November 1919, Lodge and his Republicans formed a coalition with the pro-treaty Democrats to pass a treaty with reservations, but Wilson rejected this compromise and enough Democrats followed his lead to defeat ratification. Therefore, despite the United States being a key player in the negotiation of the Treaty of Versailles, Congress rejected its proposal meaning they had to refuse to ratify it. Cooper and Bailey suggest that Wilson's stroke in September had debilitated him from negotiating effectively with Lodge.

== Harding and Coolidge, 1921–1929 ==
=== Harding takes office ===
By the time Harding took office, several new European states had been established in the Aftermath of World War I

==== Peace with Germany and avoid League of Nations ====
Campaigning against Wilson's policies and on the promise of a "return to normalcy," Republican Warren G. Harding won a landslide victory in the 1920 United States presidential election. With the Treaty of Versailles still unratified, the U.S. remained technically at war with Germany, Austria, and Hungary. Peacemaking began with the Knox–Porter Resolution, declaring the U.S. at peace and reserving any rights granted under Versailles. Treaties with Germany, Austria, and Hungary, each containing many of the non-League provisions of the Treaty of Versailles, were ratified in 1921. This still left the question of relations between the U.S. and the League. Hughes' State Department initially ignored communications from the League, or tried to bypass it through direct communications with member nations. By 1922, though, the U.S., through its consul in Geneva, was dealing with the League. The U.S. refused to participate in any League meeting with political implications, but it sent observers to sessions on technical and humanitarian matters.

==== Not joining World Court ====
Harding stunned the capital when he sent to the Senate a message supporting the participation of the U.S. in the proposed Permanent Court of International Justice (also known as the "World Court"). His proposal was not favorably received by most senators, and a resolution supporting U.S. membership in the World Court was drafted and promptly buried in the Foreign Affairs Committee. In 1926, the Senate approved joining the Court with reservations. The League of Nations accepted the reservations, but it suggested some modifications of its own. The Senate failed to act on the modifications, and the United States never joined the World Court.

=== Disarmament ===
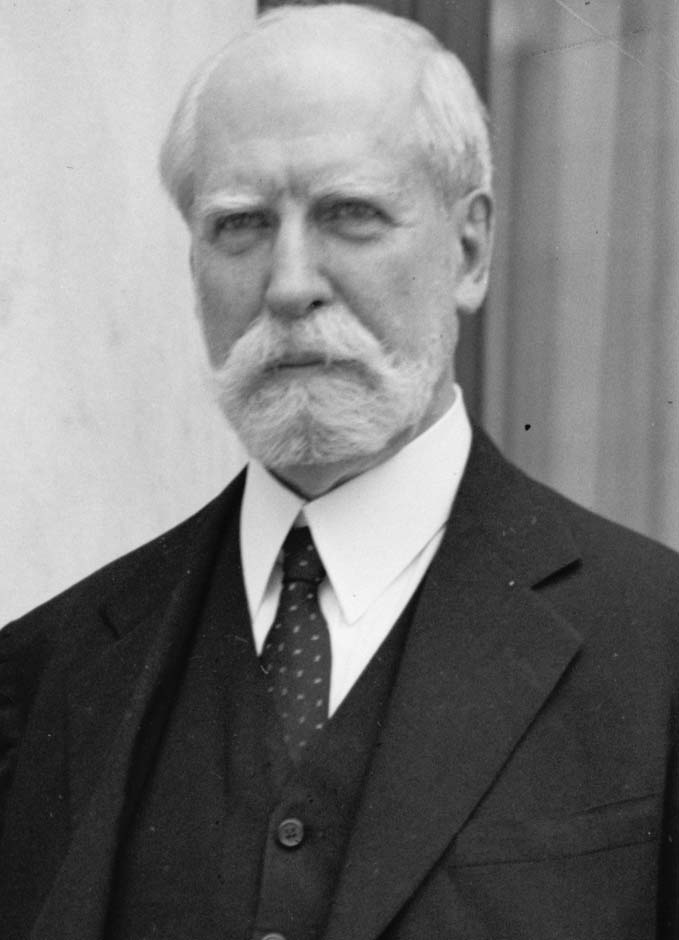
Charles Evans Hughes, 1916 Republican presidential candidate and Harding's Secretary of State, 1921–1925

At the end of World War I, the United States had the largest navy in the world. With no serious threat to the United States itself, Harding and his successors presided over the disarmament of the navy and the army. The army shrank to 140,000 men, while naval reduction was based on a policy of parity with Britain. Seeking to prevent an arms race, Senator William Borah won passage of a congressional resolution calling for a 50 percent reduction of the American Navy, the British Navy, and the Japanese Navy. With Congress's backing, Harding and Hughes began preparations to hold a naval disarmament conference in Washington. The Washington Naval Conference convened in November 1921, with representatives from the U.S., Japan, Britain, France, Italy, China, Belgium, the Netherlands, and Portugal. Secretary of State Hughes assumed a primary role in the conference and made the pivotal proposal—the U.S. would reduce its number of warships by 30 if Great Britain decommissioned 19 ships and Japan decommissioned 17 ships. A journalist covering the conference wrote that "Hughes sank in thirty-five minutes more ships than all of the admirals of the world have sunk in a cycle of centuries.

The conference produced six treaties and twelve resolutions among the participating nations, which ranged from limiting the tonnage of naval ships to custom tariffs. The United States, Britain, Japan, and France reached the Four-Power Treaty, in which each country agreed to respect the territorial integrity of one another in the Pacific Ocean. Those four powers as well as Italy also reached the Washington Naval Treaty, which established a ratio of battleship tonnage that each country agreed to respect. In the Nine-Power Treaty, each signatory agreed to respect the Open Door Policy in China, and Japan agreed to return Shandong to China.

=== Debt reduction ===
By the time Harding took office, there were calls from foreign governments for the reduction of the massive war debt owed to the United States, and the German government sought to reduce the reparations that it was required to pay. Washington, however, refused to consider any multilateral settlement. Harding sought passage of a plan proposed by Mellon to give the administration broad authority to reduce war debts in negotiation, but Congress, in 1922, passed a more restrictive bill. Hughes negotiated an agreement for Britain to pay off its war debt over 62 years at low interest, effectively reducing the present value of the obligations. This agreement, approved by Congress in 1923, set a pattern for negotiations with other nations.

Coolidge initially rejected calls to forgive Europe's debt or lower tariffs on European goods, but the Occupation of the Ruhr in 1923 stirred him to action. On Secretary of State Hughes's initiative, Coolidge appointed Charles Dawes to lead an international commission to reach an agreement on Germany's reparations. The resulting Dawes Plan provided for restructuring of the German debt, and the United States loaned money to Germany to help it repay its debts to other countries. The Dawes Plan led to a boom in the German economy, as well as a sentiment of international cooperation.

=== Renunciation of war ===
Building on the success of the Dawes Plan, U.S. ambassador Alanson B. Houghton helped organize the Locarno Conference in October 1925. The conference was designed to ease tensions between Germany and France, the latter of which feared a German rearmament. In the Locarno Treaties, France, Belgium, and Germany each agreed to respect the borders established by the Treaty of Versailles and pledged not to attack each other. Germany also agreed to arbitrate its eastern boundaries with the states created in the Treaty of Versailles.

Coolidge's primary foreign policy initiative was the Kellogg–Briand Pact of 1928, named for Secretary of State Kellogg and French foreign minister Aristide Briand. The treaty, ratified in 1929, committed signatories—the United States, the United Kingdom, France, Germany, Italy, and Japan—to "renounce war, as an instrument of national policy in their relations with one another." The treaty did not achieve its intended result—the outlawry of war—but it did provide the founding principle for international law after World War II. Coolidge's policy of international disarmament allowed the administration to decrease military spending, a part of Coolidge's broader policy of decreasing government spending. Coolidge also favored an extension of the Washington Naval Treaty to cover cruisers, but the U.S., Britain, and Japan were unable to come to an agreement at the Geneva Naval Conference.

=== Immigration ===
Immigration to the United States had increased during the first two decades of the twentieth century, with many of the immigrants coming from Southern Europe and Eastern Europe rather than Western Europe. Many Americans viewed these new immigrants with suspicion, and World War I and the First Red Scare further heightened nativist fears. A constituent writing to Senator William Borah reflected the opinion of many who favored immigration restriction, stating "immigration should be completely stopped for at least one generation until we can assimilate and Americanize the millions who are in our midst." This ultimately restricted new cultures and ideas from entering the nation, as Americans were eager to focus on its own resources and developing its own culture from within. The Per Centum Act of 1921, signed by Harding on May 19, 1921, reduced the numbers of immigrants to 3 percent of a country's represented population based on the 1910 Census. The act, which had been vetoed by President Wilson in the previous Congress, also allowed unauthorized immigrants to be deported. Immigration to the United States fell from roughly 800,000 in 1920 to approximately 300,000 in 1922.

In the years after the passage of the Emergency Quota Act, members of Congress debated the substance of a permanent immigration bill. Most leaders of both parties favored a permanent bill that would greatly restrict immigration, with the major exception being Al Smith and other urban Democrats. Business leaders had previously favored unlimited immigration to the United States, but mechanization, the entrance of women into the labor force, and the migration of Southern blacks into the North had all contributed to a reduced demand for foreign-born labor. Coolidge endorsed an extension of the cap on immigration in his 1923 State of the Union, but his administration was less supportive of the continuation of the National Origins Formula, which effectively restricted immigration from countries outside of Northwestern Europe. Secretary of State Hughes strongly opposed the quotas, particularly the total ban on Japanese immigration, which violated the Gentlemen's Agreement of 1907 with Japan. Despite his own reservations, Coolidge choose to sign the restrictive Immigration Act of 1924. The Emergency Quota Act had limited annual immigration from any given country to 3 percent of the immigrant population from that country living in the United States in 1920; The Immigration Act of 1924 instead "provided immigration visas to two percent of the total number of people of each nationality in the United States as of the 1890 national census", as Asian immigrants were excluded entirely. Subsequently, the flow of immigrants into the U.S. was severely limited. The immigration laws succeeded in maintaining America's existing ethnic composition, ultimately unaffecting its culture and society. The policies protected American civilians' jobs as there was less competition coming in, removing fears that immigrants would also be a drain on the nation's resources.

== Hoover and the Great Depression, 1929–1933 ==
When Hoover took office, an international committee meeting in Paris promulgated the Young Plan, which created the Bank for International Settlements and stipulated the partial forgiveness of German World War I reparations. Hoover was wary of agreeing to the plan, as he feared that it would be linked to reduced payments on loans the U.S. extended to France and Britain in World War I. He ultimately agreed to support the proposal at the urging of Owen D. Young, the American industrialist who chaired the committee. Due to the severe effects of the Great Depression on its economy, Germany was unable to pay reparations under the Young Plan's schedule. In response, Hoover issued the Hoover Moratorium, a one-year halt on Allied war loans conditional on a suspension of German reparations payments. Hoover also made American bankers agree to refrain from demanding payment on private loans from Germans. Hoover hoped that the moratorium would help stabilize the European economy, which he viewed as a major cause of economic troubles in the United States. As the moratorium neared its expiration the following year, an attempt to find a permanent solution was made at the Lausanne Conference of 1932. The agreement reached there was not approved by any of the affected countries because acceptance was provisional on the United States cancelling the war debts owed to it, and that did not happen. Reparations payments as a result virtually stopped.

Hoover placed a priority on disarmament, which he hoped would allow the United States to shift money from the military to domestic needs. Hoover and Stimson focused on extending the 1922 Washington Naval Treaty, which sought to prevent a naval arms race. A previous effort to extend the Washington Naval Treaty, the Geneva Naval Conference, had failed to produce results, but the Hoover administration convinced the British to re-open negotiations. In 1930 the United States and other major naval powers signed the London Naval Treaty. The treaty represented the first time that the naval powers had agreed to cap their tonnage of auxiliary vessels (previous agreements had focused on capital ships), but the treaty did not include France or Italy. The treaty provoked a nationalist backlash in Japan due to its reconfirmation of the "5–5–3" ratio which limited Japan to a smaller fleet than the United States or the United Kingdom. At the 1932 World Disarmament Conference, Hoover urged worldwide cutbacks in armaments and the outlawing of tanks and bombers, but his proposals were not adopted.

=== Japanese invasion of Manchuria ===
In 1931, Japan invaded Manchuria, defeating the Republic of China's military forces and establishing Manchukuo, a puppet state. The Hoover administration deplored the invasion, but also sought to avoid antagonizing the Japanese, fearing that taking too strong of a stand would weaken the moderate forces in the Japanese government. Hoover also viewed the Japanese as a potential ally against the Soviet Union, which he saw as a much greater threat. In response to the Japanese invasion, Hoover and Secretary of State Stimson outlined the Stimson Doctrine, which held that the United States would not recognize territories gained by force. The Hoover administration based this declaration on the 1928 Kellogg–Briand Pact, in which several nations (including Japan and the United States) renounced war and promised to peacefully solve disputes. In the aftermath of invasion of Manchuria, Stimson and other members of the Cabinet came to believe that war with Japan might be inevitable, though Hoover continued to push for disarmament among the world powers. The short term impact of the Stimson Doctrine was slight, but the long-term impact set the stage in the late 1930s for strong American support for China against Japan, even among opponents of any involvement in Europe.

=== Rise of Hitler ===
In early 1933, during Hoover's last days in office, Adolf Hitler and the Nazi Party came into power in Germany. At first, many in the United States thought of Hitler as something of a comic figure, but Hitler quickly consolidated his power in Germany and attacked the post-war order established by the Treaty of Versailles. Hitler preached a racist doctrine of Aryan superiority, and his central foreign policy goal was the acquisition of territory to Germany's east, which he sought to repopulate with Germans.

== Latin America, 1913–1933 ==
=== Panama Canal ===
The Panama Canal opened in 1914, fulfilling the long-term American goal of building a canal across Central America. The canal provided quick passage between the Pacific Ocean with the Atlantic Ocean, presenting new opportunities to the shippers and allowing the Navy to quickly transfer warships between the two oceans. In April 1921, Harding gained the ratification of the Thomson–Urrutia Treaty with Colombia, granting that nation $25,000,000 as settlement for the U.S.-provoked Panamanian revolution of 1903. The Latin American nations were not fully satisfied, as the U.S. refused to renounce interventionism, though Hughes pledged to limit it to nations near the Panama Canal and to make it clear what the U.S. aims were.

=== Interventions ===
Wilson sought closer relations with Latin America, and he hoped to create a Pan-American organization to arbitrate international disputes. He also negotiated a treaty with Colombia that would have paid that country an indemnity for the U.S. role in the secession of Panama, but the Senate defeated this treaty. However, Wilson frequently intervened in Latin American affairs, saying in 1913: "I am going to teach the South American republics to elect good men." In 1915, the U.S. intervened in Haiti after a revolt overthrew the Haitian government, beginning an occupation that would last until 1919. The Dominican Republic had been a de facto American protectorate since Roosevelt's presidency, but continued to suffer from instability and in 1916, Wilson sent troops to occupy the other side of the island. Wilson also authorized military interventions in Cuba, Panama, and Honduras. The 1914 Bryan–Chamorro Treaty converted Nicaragua into another de facto protectorate, and the U.S. stationed soldiers there throughout Wilson's presidency.

Intervention in Latin America became a minor campaign issue in the 1920 presidential election as Harding spoke against Wilson's decision to send U.S. troops to the Dominican Republic, and attacked the Democratic vice presidential candidate, Franklin D. Roosevelt, for his role in the Haitian intervention. Secretary of State Hughes worked to improve relations with Latin American countries who were wary of the American use of the Monroe Doctrine to justify intervention; at the time of Harding's inauguration, the U.S. also had troops in Cuba and Nicaragua. The troops stationed in Cuba to protect American interests were withdrawn in 1921, but U.S. forces remained in the other three nations through Harding's presidency.

The United States' occupation of Nicaragua and Haiti continued under Coolidge's administration, though Coolidge withdrew American troops from the Dominican Republic in 1924. The U.S. established a domestic constabulary in the Dominican Republic to promote internal order without the need for U.S. intervention, but the constabulary's leader, Rafael Trujillo, eventually seized power. Coolidge led the U.S. delegation to the Sixth International Conference of American States, January 15–17, 1928, in Havana, Cuba. There, he extended an olive branch to Latin American leaders embittered over America's interventionist policies in Central America and the Caribbean.

President Hoover largely made good on a pledge made prior to assuming office not to interfere in Latin America's internal affairs. In 1930, he released the Clark Memorandum, a rejection of the Roosevelt Corollary and a move towards non-interventionism in Latin America. Hoover did not completely refrain from the use of the military in Latin American affairs; he thrice threatened intervention in the Dominican Republic, and he sent warships to El Salvador to support the government against a left-wing revolution. But he wound down the Banana Wars, ending the occupation of Nicaragua and nearly bringing an end to the occupation of Haiti. Franklin Roosevelt's Good Neighbor policy would continue the trend towards non-interventionism in Latin America.

=== Mexico ===
Wilson took office during the Mexican Revolution, which had begun in 1911 after liberals overthrew the military dictatorship of Porfirio Díaz. Shortly before Wilson took office, conservatives retook power through a coup led by Victoriano Huerta. Wilson rejected the legitimacy of Huerta's "government of butchers" and demanded Mexico hold democratic elections. Wilson's unprecedented approach meant no recognition and doomed Huerta's prospects for establishing a stable government. After Huerta arrested U.S. Navy personnel who had accidentally landed in a restricted zone near the northern port town of Tampico, Wilson dispatched the Navy to occupy the Mexican city of Veracruz. A strong backlash against the American intervention among Mexicans of all political affiliations convinced Wilson to abandon his plans to expand the U.S. military intervention, but the intervention nonetheless helped convince Huerta to flee from the country. A group led by Venustiano Carranza established control over a significant proportion of Mexico, and Wilson recognized Carranza's government in October 1915.

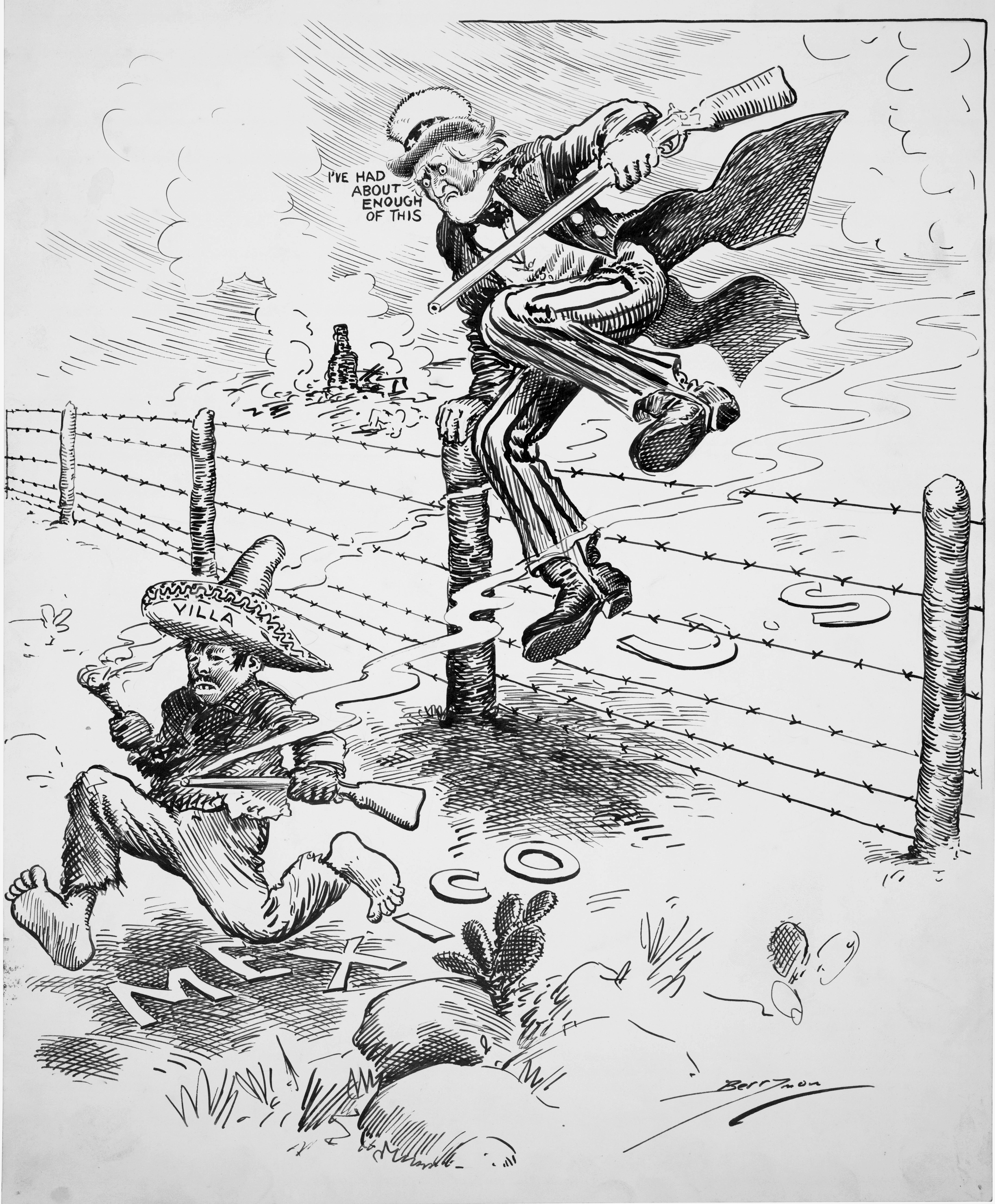
Editorial cartoon by Clifford Berryman reflects American demand for action against Pancho Villa

==== Chasing Pancho Villa ====
Though the administration had achieved the desired result, it was a pyrrhic victory, as Carranza's lieutenant, Pancho Villa, presented a more serious threat in 1916.

In early 1916 Pancho Villa raided Columbus, a small American town in New Mexico, killing eighteen Americans and sparking an enormous nationwide American demand for his punishment. Wilson ordered Gen. John Pershing and 4000 troops across the border to capture Villa. By April, Pershing's forces had broken up and dispersed Villas bands. Villa remained on the loose and Pershing continued his pursuit deep into Mexico. President Carranza then pivoted against the Americans and accused them of a punitive invasion, Violent confrontations led to the brink of war by June. However tensions subsided and bilateral negotiations began. The issue had become a possible war with Germany so Wilson ended Pershing's diversion into Mexico ended in February, 1917. The chase after Villa was a small military episode, but it had important long-term implications in Mexico. It enabled Carranza to mobilize popular anger, strengthen his political position, and permanently strengthening anti-American sentiment in Mexico.

==== 1917--Germany invites Mexico to war ====
In January Germany's 1917 foreign minister sent Mexico the Zimmermann Telegram invited it to join in war against the United States. Washington learned of the Zimmermann proposal on February 23 and detentewith Mexico was essential. Wilson accorded Carranza diplomatic recognition in April, after Congress declared war on Germany. Biographer Arthur Link calls it Carranza's victory—his successful handling of the chaos inside Mexico, as well as over Wilson's policies. Mexico was now free to develop its revolution without American pressure.

The raid into Mexico did not catch Villa but it did make Pershing a national figure. Wilson selected him to command the American forces being sent to fight in France. The expedition involved 15,000 American regulars; some 110,000 part-time soldiers of the National Guard were activated to serve border duty inside the United States. It gave the American army some needed experience in dealing with training, planning and logistics. Most importantly, it highlighted serious weaknesses in the National Guard in terms of training, recruiting, planning, and ability to mobilize quickly. It gave the American public a way to work out its frustrations over the European stalemate and it showed that the United States was willing to defend its borders while keeping that demonstration on a small scale.

==== Post-revolution ====
A new Mexican government under President Álvaro Obregón sought recognition, but the Wilson administration refused. Under Harding, both Hughes and Secretary of the Interior Fall opposed recognition; Hughes instead sent a draft treaty to the Mexicans in May 1921, which included pledges to reimburse Americans for losses in Mexico since the 1910 revolution there. Obregón was unwilling to sign a treaty before being recognized, and he and worked to improve the relationship between American businesses and Mexico, reaching agreement with creditors and mounting a public relations campaign in the United States. This had its effect, and by mid-1922, Fall was less influential than he had been, lessening the resistance to recognition. The two presidents appointed commissioners to reach a deal, and the U.S. recognized the Obregón government on August 31, 1923, just under a month after Harding's death, substantially on the terms proffered by Mexico.

In 1924, Plutarco Elías Calles took office as President of Mexico, and Calles sought to limit American property claims and take control of the holdings of the Catholic Church. However, Ambassador Dwight Morrow convinced Calles to allow Americans to retain their rights to property purchased before 1917, and Mexico and the United States enjoyed good relations for the remainder of Coolidge's presidency. With the aid of a Catholic priest from the U.S., Morrow also helped bring an end to the Cristero War, a Catholic revolt against Calles's government.

As part of his efforts to limit unemployment, Hoover sought to cut immigration to the United States, and in 1930 he promulgated an executive order requiring individuals to have employment before migrating to the United States. With the goal of opening up more jobs for U.S. citizens, Secretary of Labor William N. Doak began a campaign to prosecute illegal immigrants in the United States. Though Doak did not seek to deport one specific group of immigrants, his campaign most strongly affected Mexican Americans, especially Mexican Americans living in Southern California. Many of the deportations were overseen by state and local authorities who acted on the encouragement of Doak and the Department of Labor. During the 1930s, approximately one million Mexican Americans were forcibly "repatriated" to Mexico; approximately sixty percent of those deported were birthright citizens.

=== American investment and trade ===
Under the leadership of economist Edwin W. Kemmerer, the U.S. extended its influence in Latin America through financial advisers. With the support of the State Department, Kemmerer negotiated agreements with Colombia, Chile, and other countries in which the countries received loans and agreed to follow the advice of U.S. financial advisers. These "Kemmerized" countries received substantial investments and became increasingly dependent on trade with the United States.

== Other countries and regions, 1913–1933 ==
=== Russia and the Soviet Union ===
After Russia left World War I following the Bolshevik Revolution of 1917, the Allies sent troops there to prevent a German or Bolshevik takeover of weapons, munitions and other supplies previously shipped as aid to the pre-revolutionary government. Wilson loathed the Bolsheviks, who he believed did not represent the Russian people, but he feared that foreign intervention would only strengthen Bolshevik rule. Britain and France pressured him to intervene in order to potentially re-open a second front against Germany, and Wilson acceded to this pressure in the hope that it would help him in post-war negotiations and check Japanese influence in Siberia. The U.S. sent armed forces to assist the withdrawal of Czechoslovak Legions along the Trans-Siberian Railway, and to hold key port cities at Arkhangelsk and Vladivostok. Though specifically instructed not to engage the Bolsheviks, the U.S. forces engaged in several armed conflicts against forces of the new Russian government. Revolutionaries in Russia resented the United States intrusion. Robert Maddox wrote, "The immediate effect of the intervention was to prolong a bloody civil war, thereby costing thousands of additional lives and wreaking enormous destruction on an already battered society."

Commerce Secretary Hoover, with considerable experience of Russian affairs, took the lead on Russian policy in the Harding administration. He supported aid to and trade with Russia, fearing U.S. companies would be frozen out of the Soviet market. When famine struck Russia in 1921, Hoover had the American Relief Administration, which he had headed, negotiate with the Russians to provide aid. According to historian George Herring, the American relief effort may have saved as many as 10 million people from starvation. U.S. businessman such as Armand Hammer invested in the Russian economy, but many of these investments failed due to various Russian restrictions on trade and commerce. Russian and (after the 1922 establishment of the Soviet Union) Soviet leaders hoped that these economic and humanitarian connections would lead to recognition of their government, but Communism's extreme unpopularity in the U.S. precluded this possibility.

By the late 1920s, the Soviet Union was no longer a pariah in European affairs, and had normal diplomatic and trade relations with most countries. By 1933, old American fears of Communist threats had faded, and the business community, as well as newspaper editors, were calling for diplomatic recognition. After the Soviets promised they would not engage in espionage, Roosevelt used his presidential authority to normalize relations in November 1933.

=== Middle East ===
In 1919, Wilson guided American foreign policy to "acquiesce" in the Balfour Declaration without supporting Zionism in an official way. Wilson expressed sympathy for the plight of Jews, especially in Poland and France.

In May 1920, Wilson sent a long-deferred proposal to Congress to have the U.S. accept a mandate from the League of Nations to take over Armenia. Bailey notes this was opposed by American public opinion, and had the support of only 23 senators. Richard G. Hovannisian states that Wilson "made all the wrong arguments" for the mandate and focused less on the immediate policy than on how history would judge his actions: "[he] wished to place it clearly on the record that the abandonment of Armenia was not his doing."

=== Japan ===
Relations with Japan had warmed with the signing of the Washington Naval Treaty and were further bolstered by U.S. aid in the aftermath of the 1923 Great Kantō earthquake, which killed as many as 200,000 Japanese and left another 2 million homeless. However, relations soured with the passage of the Immigration Act of 1924, which banned immigration from Japan to the United States. U.S. officials encouraged Japan to protest the ban while the legislation was drafted, but Japanese threats backfired as supporters of the legislation used the threats to galvanize opposition to Japanese immigration. The immigration legislation sparked a major backlash in Japan, strengthening the position of those in Japan who favored expansionism over cooperation with Western powers.

=== China ===
The Coolidge administration at first avoided engagement with the Republic of China, which was led by Sun Yat-sen and his successor, Chiang Kai-shek. The administration protested the Northern Expedition when it resulted in attacks on foreigners, and refused to consider renegotiating treaties reached with China when it had been under the rule of the Qing dynasty. In 1927, Chiang purged his government of communists and began to seek U.S. support. Seeking closer relations with China, Secretary of State Kellogg agreed to grant tariff autonomy, meaning that China would have the right to set import duties on American goods.

== See also ==
- Foreign policy of Herbert Hoover
- Foreign policy of the Woodrow Wilson administration
- International relations of the Great Powers (1814–1919)
- International relations (1919–1939)
