= Foreign policy of Herbert Hoover =

Foreign policy of Herbert Hoover covers the international activities and policies of Herbert Hoover for his entire career, with emphasis to his roles from 1914 to 1933.

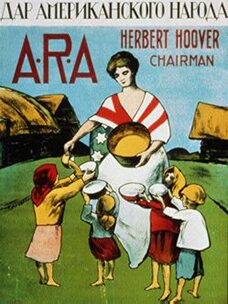
American Relief Administration (ARA) American relief mission to Russia headed by Herbert Hoover 1921

Hoover had many interests around the world:

- Belgian relief in 1914–1917. He worked with Berlin and London to allow shipments of food to Belgium.
- Food: When the US entered the war in 1917 Hoover left London and headed the new U.S. Food Administration, coordinating food supplies and relief efforts to the Allies
- Russia: During the postwar Russian Revolution, Hoover played a key role in providing humanitarian relief to famine-stricken areas of Russia.
- Disarmament: Hoover was an advocate for arms reduction and international disarmament as a means to maintain peace and prevent future conflicts.
- Latin America: Hoover sought to improve relations with Latin American countries, emphasizing economic cooperation, investment, and non-intervention in their affairs. As President, Hoover began what President Roosevelt continued as "the Good Neighbor Policy," which aimed to strengthen ties and mutual respect.
- Tariffs and Protectionism: Hoover implemented protectionist policies, including signing the Smoot-Hawley Tariff Act in 1930, which raised tariffs on imported goods. This move aimed to protect American industry but other countries retaliated and US exports plunged.
- Non-interventionism: Hoover strongly favored a non-interventionist approach to foreign wars. He campaigned to keep the United States out of direct military involvement in World War II during 1939–1941.

== World War I ==
World War I broke out in August 1914, pitting Germany and its allies against France and Britain and their allies. The US was neutral, and about 125,000 American tourists and visitors were trapped in Europe and needed to get home immediately. The transatlantic passenger ships were temporarily cancelled, and banks were closed so they were short of money. They flooded the American embassies especially in London. Hoover volunteered and soon took charge of operations in London in cooperation with other London-based American businessmen and the US ambassador. Hoover raised money locally until gold appropriated by Congress arrived. His team helped tens of thousands with loans and travel assistance. He finished his emergency role by October.

=== Post-war relief in Europe ===
==== American relief and Russian famine of 1921 ====
Under Hoover's direction, very large scale food relief was distributed to Europe after the war though the American Relief Administration. In 1921, to ease famine in Russia, the ARA's director in Europe, Walter Lyman Brown, began negotiated an agreement with Soviet People's Commissar for Foreign Affairs, Maxim Litvinov in August, 1921; an additional implementation agreement was signed by Brown and People's Commissar for Foreign Trade Leonid Krasin on December 30, 1921. The U.S. Congress appropriated $20,000,000 for relief under the Russian Famine Relief Act of late 1921. At its peak, the ARA employed 300 Americans, more than 120,000 Russians and fed 10.5 million people daily. Its Russian operations were headed by Col. William N. Haskell. The Medical Division of the ARA functioned from November 1921 to June 1923 and helped overcome the typhus epidemic then ravaging Russia. Hoover strongly detested Bolshevism, and felt the American aid would demonstrate the superiority of Western capitalism and thus help contain the spread of communism.

The ARA's operations in Russia were shut down on June 15, 1923, after it was discovered that Russia renewed the export of grain.

== President, 1929–1933 ==
In his Memoirs, Hoover recalled his main efforts to promote peace:

1. "Good Neighbor policy:" Ending intervention policy in Latin America.
2. Advocated adherence to the World Court with reservations.
3. Negotiated treaties calling for arbitration and conciliation.
4. Expanded the Kellogg-Briand peace pact.
5. Cooperated with the League of Nations and activities that did not involve force.
6. Reduced naval competition with Great Britain.
7. Ended British expansion of its naval and air bases in the Western hemisphere.
8. Worked to sustain democratic government in Weimar Germany.
9. Worked with other nations to restrain Japanese aggression in China. Although he did use military force to protect American interests in China.
10. Worked a limit the international naval arms race.
11. In 1931 imposed a moratorium on intergovernmental debts to reduce the impact of the Great Depression

=== Disarmament ===
Hoover placed a priority on disarmament, which he hoped would allow the United States to shift money from the military to domestic needs. Hoover and his Secretary of State Henry L. Stimson focused on extending the 1922 Washington Naval Treaty, which sought to prevent a naval arms race. As a result of Hoover's efforts, the United States and other major naval powers signed the 1930 London Naval Treaty. The treaty represented the first time that the naval powers had agreed to cap their tonnage of auxiliary vessels, as previous agreements had only affected capital ships.

Hoover's Chief of Naval Operations William V. Pratt (1930–1933) agreed with Hoovers's emphasis on disarmament and went along with postponement of new construction and cutting the fleet. Other naval officers disagreed sharply with Hoover's policies.

At the 1932 World Disarmament Conference, Hoover urged further cutbacks in armaments and the outlawing of tanks and bombers, but his proposals were not adopted.

=== China ===
In 1931, Japan invaded Manchuria, defeating the Republic of China's National Revolutionary Army and establishing Manchukuo, a puppet state. The Hoover administration deplored the invasion, but also sought to avoid antagonizing the Japanese, fearing that taking too strong a stand would weaken the moderate forces in the Japanese government and alienate a potential ally against the Soviet Union, which he saw as a much greater threat. In response to the Japanese invasion, Hoover and Secretary of State Stimson outlined the Stimson Doctrine, which held that the United States would not recognize territories gained by force.

=== Trade decline: Higher tariff and hostile retaliation ===
The Tariff Act of 1930, commonly known as the Smoot–Hawley Tariff, implemented protectionist trade policies, was signed by President Hoover on June 17, 1930. The act raised US tariffs on over 20,000 imported goods. The new law and tariffs imposed by America's trading partners in retaliation were major factors of the reduction of American exports and imports by 67% during the Depression. Most of the decline was due to a plunge in GDP in the US and worldwide. However beyond that was additional decline. Some countries protested and others also retaliated with trade restrictions and tariffs. American exports to the protesters fell 18% and exports to those who retaliated fell 31%. Economists and economic historians have a consensus view that the Smoot–Hawley Tariff worsened the effects of the Great Depression.

=== Latin America ===
According to William Leuchtenburg, during Hoover's term, the world order established in the immediate aftermath of World War I began to crumble. As president, Hoover largely made good on his pledge made prior to assuming office not to interfere in Latin America's internal affairs. In 1930, he released the Clark Memorandum, a rejection of the Roosevelt Corollary and a move towards non-interventionism in Latin America. Hoover did not completely refrain from the use of the military in Latin American affairs; he thrice threatened intervention in the Dominican Republic, and he sent warships to El Salvador to support the government against a left-wing revolution. Notwithstanding those actions, he wound down the Banana Wars, ending the occupation of Nicaragua and nearly bringing an end to the occupation of Haiti.

The Roosevelt Corollary, articulated by President Theodore Roosevelt in 1904, states that the United States could intervene in the internal affairs of Latin American countries if they committed flagrant and chronic financial wrongdoings. The U.S. took over the police role to stop interventions by European powers. Hoover in 1930 endorsed the Clark Memorandum that repudiated the Roosevelt Corollary in favor of what was later called the Good Neighbor policy.

==== Haiti and Nicaragua ====
Hoover appointed William Cameron Forbes to lead a commission to Haiti in 1930. Forbes gave Hoover a plan to stabilize Haiti and remove the Marines. An agreement in August 1931 started the withdrawal and a similar plan led to Hoover's withdrawal of troops from Nicaragua. Franklin Roosevelt later completed the process, calling it the "Good Neighbor policy." It ended three decades of intervention, but ignored the rise of dictators.

=== Debt moratorium of 1931 ===
The Hoover Moratorium was a one-year suspension of Germany's World War I reparations obligations and of the repayment of the war loans that the United States had extended to the Allies in 1917/18. The moratorium was the result of a proposal President Hoover issued on 20 June 1931 that was intended to ease the ongoing international financial crisis and provide time for recovery. The moratorium included payments on both principal and interest.

The proposal was met with initial disapproval from France and many American citizens, but after much telephone lobbying by Hoover, it had gained support from 15 nations by 6 July. It was approved by the United States Congress in December.

A few of the former Allies continued to make payments to the United States on their war loans after the moratorium expired, but only Finland was able and willing to meet all obligations. German reparation payments did not resume in 1932 due to the overall economic situation. Germany's war debts were finally consolidated and paid off in 1953 by the London Agreement on German External Debts.

== Ex-president 1933–1964 ==
=== Late 1930s ===
In March 1938, Hoover visited Nazi Germany to meet Adolf Hitler and other high-ranking Nazi officials, such as Hermann Göring. Hoover was there to discuss Nazi Germany's economic rebuilding, if Germany could be democratic, and the Debt moratorium during his time as president, as well as his grudge towards FDR. The meeting was around 40 minutes long. Hoover also didn't want to go, but he choose to. After staying in Berlin for a while, he left for Warsaw, Poland. False accusations of the meeting being chaotic ensued and were denied by both Hoover and Hitler, and debunked by recordings. He was the only US president to meet Hitler in person.

=== World War II ===
President Roosevelt deliberately kept Hoover from any role after Pearl Harbor.

=== Late 1940s ===
After being frozen out by Roosevelt, Hoover was delighted that his offer of help to the new President Harry S Truman was quickly accepted. They became friends and Hoover took on the role as chief advisor regarding food relief and other help to impoverished Europe.

=== 1950s ===
When the Korean war broke out in 1950, Hoover first gave his friend Truman public support. But late in the year, as Chinese intervention pushed the American, South Korean and UN forces back to the South, Hoover made a major address that called for a new strategy. He repeated his warning that the massive manpower advantage of the communist states, now including China, made land warfare a losing proposition for America and its allies. Instead it was necessary to rely on technological superiority and airpower and seapower. For East Asia, Hoover recommended a different defensive alliance that included Japan, Formosa, and the Philippines, but did not include South Korea. By minimizing reliance on Army land forces, it was a cost-saving procedure. He recommends a Japan being encouraged to build up its forces as well. Hoover's position was widely adopted by formerly isolationist Republicans like Sen. Robert Taft, and criticized by the internationalist-oriented Republicans such as John Foster Dulles. Dwight D. Eisenhower agreed with Hoover's deemphasis on expensive ground armies and followed through in implementing that policy after his election in 1952.

== See also ==
- History of U.S. foreign policy, 1913–1933
  - Foreign policy of the Woodrow Wilson administration
- International relations (1919–1939)
- History of China–United States relations to 1948
- Latin America–United States relations
- United Kingdom–United States relations
- Hoover Institution Library and Archive

== Notes ==
=== Works cited ===
- Fausold, Martin L. (1985). The Presidency of Herbert C. Hoover. University Press of Kansas. ISBN 978-0-7006-0259-9.
- Herring, George C. (2008). From Colony to Superpower: U.S. Foreign Relations since 1776. Oxford University Press. ISBN 978-0-19-972343-0.
- Leuchtenburg, William E. (2009). Herbert Hoover: The American Presidents Series: The 31st President, 1929-1933. Henry Holt and Company. ISBN 978-0-8050-6958-7.
