= Johnson Doctrine =

Foreign policy doctrine of the administration of Lyndon B. Johnson

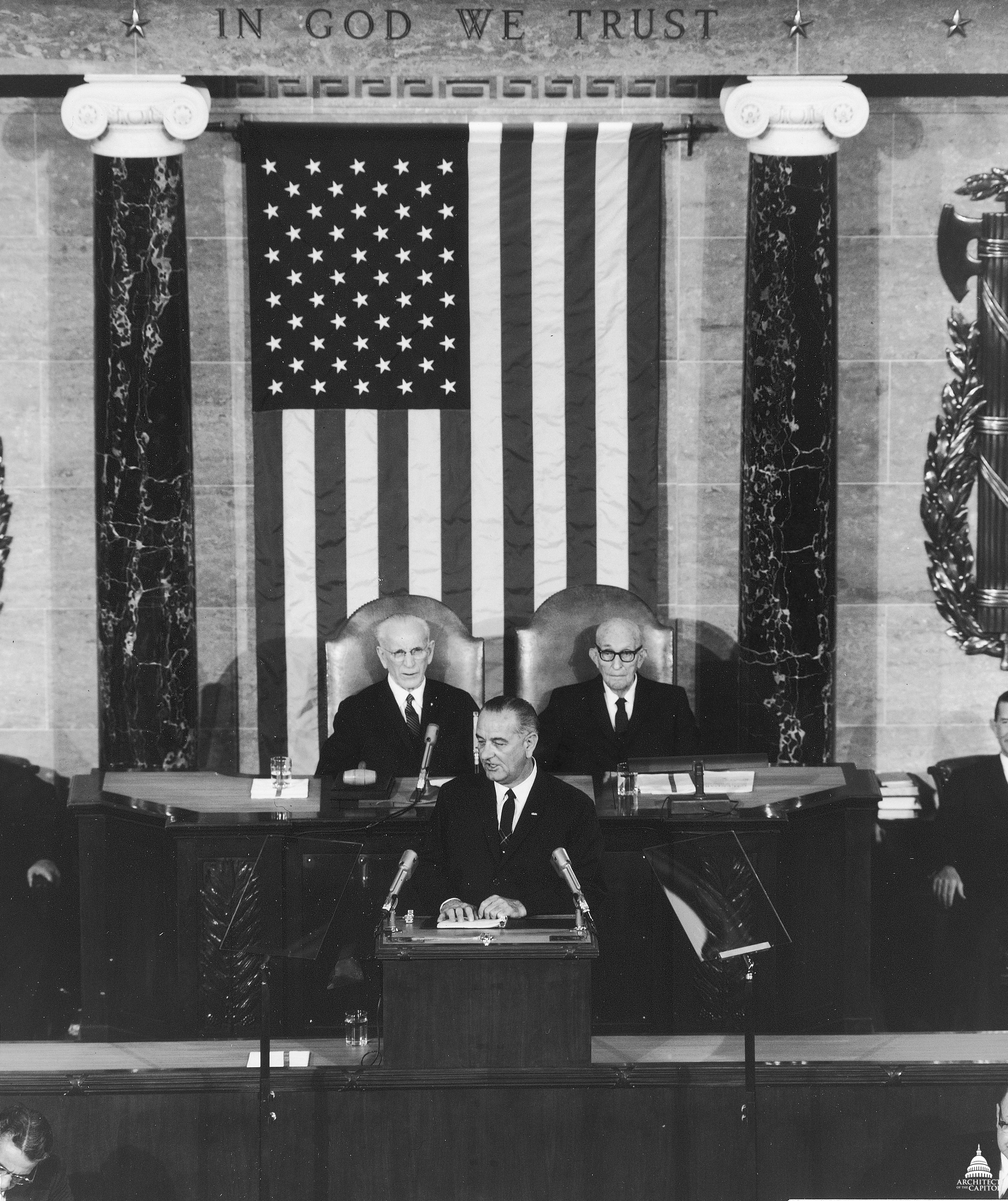
Johnson's 1965 State of the Union

The Johnson Doctrine, enunciated by United States president Lyndon B. Johnson after the country's intervention in the Dominican Republic in 1965, declared that domestic revolution in the Western Hemisphere would no longer be a local matter when the object is the establishment of a "communist dictatorship". During Johnson's presidency, the U.S. again began interfering in the internal affairs of sovereign nations, particularly Latin America (reversing the previous Good Neighbor policy of the decades prior). The Johnson Doctrine is the formal declaration of the intention of the United States to intervene in such affairs. It is an extension of the Eisenhower and Kennedy Doctrines.

== Background ==
=== Communist opposition in the United States ===
The U.S. opposed the spread of communism during the Cold War. This opposition to communism led to what is known as a Red Scare; Americans were told they should fear the potential influence of communism. Such anti-communist sentiments were made evident through statements such as the Truman Doctrine, which declared that the United States would provide assistance to nations threatened by authoritarianism.

The U.S. sought to take action against communism prior to declaration of the Johnson Doctrine; although initially opposed to the idea of sending U.S. troops to assist in the Vietnam War, Johnson was also opposed to allowing democratic East Asian nations to fall to communist takeovers.

=== United States interventionism in Latin America ===
Prior to the implementation of the Johnson Doctrine, the United States already had a history of intervening in Latin American affairs. However, the more recent interventions in Latin America prior to the implementation of the Johnson Doctrine were more covert such as the Bay of Pigs Invasion. The affairs of the U.S. and the Dominican Republic have been closely entangled for much of American history; in 1849, the president of the Dominican Republic requested that the country be annexed by the U.S., and during the presidency of Millard Fillmore, the president noted the country’s special interest in the affairs of the Dominican Republic as a result of its proximity to the United States.

==== Big stick ideology ====
Beginning in 1901 through 1933, the U.S. used the Roosevelt Corollary and the Platt Amendment as justification for military intervention in Latin America. For example, in the Spanish–American War, the United States defeated Spain and secured Cuban independence; however, the United States exerted pressure on Cuba and forced the new government to include the Platt Amendment in their new constitution, guaranteeing the right for the U.S. to intervene in Cuban affairs. This period, marked by President Theodore Roosevelt's declaration that the U.S. would act as the international police power of the west, reduced the influence of European powers in the Caribbean, Central and South America and in turn, increased American influence in the regions.

==== World War II and the Cold War ====
These interventions were temporarily ended by President Franklin D. Roosevelt's Good Neighbor policy. The Good Neighbor Policy served as a termination of U.S. interventionism, albeit temporary. However, the Good Neighbor Policy did require Latin American nations to accept the leadership of the United States.

Following World War II and the onset of the Cold War, the U.S. began to view Latin America through a new lens; the potential for the Soviet Union to establish communist regimes in Central and South America was seen as a serious concern. As a result the United States intervened in several countries, including the Dominican Republic, in an effort to prevent the spread of communism. The nature of these interventions was different from prior interventions. In 1948, the Organization of American States was created. This organization, along with the Inter-American Treaty of Reciprocal Assistance of 1947, meant that the United States could still intervene but needed clear justification to do so.

==== Dominican intervention of 1965 ====
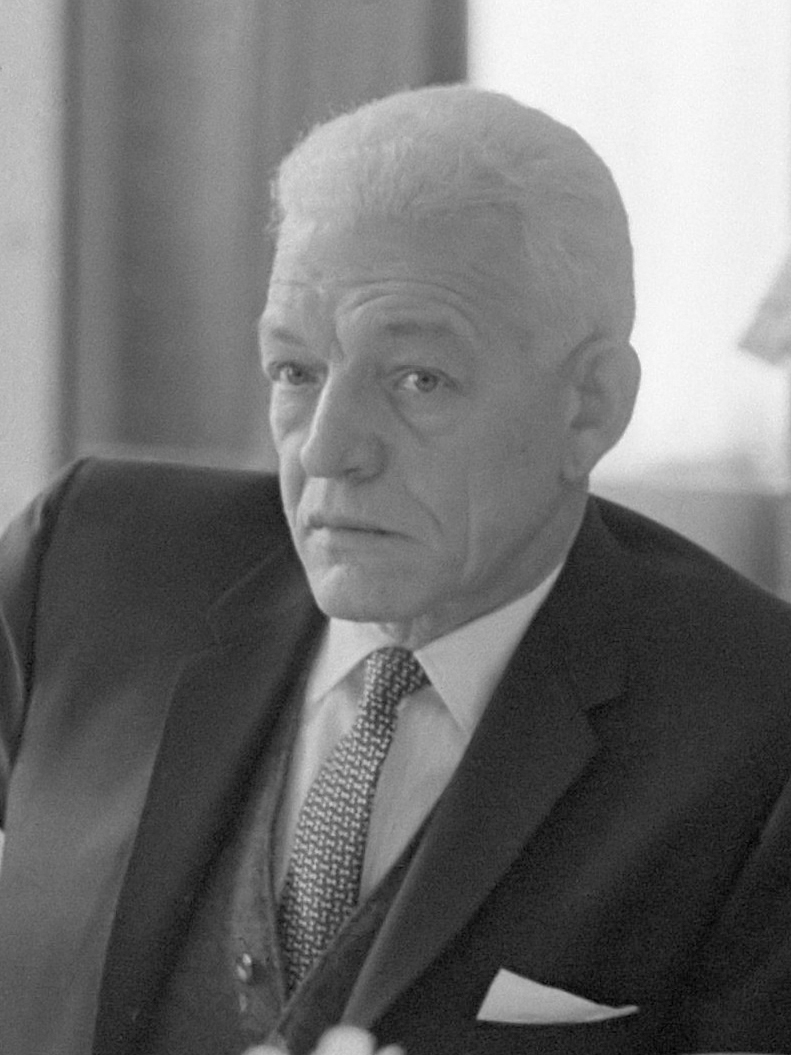
President of the Dominican Republic Juan Bosch, 1963

Prior to the intervention in the Dominican Republic that led to the proclamation of the Johnson Doctrine, the U.S. had engaged with the Dominican Republic in several ways; these included implementing sanctions, threatening military force, and ensuring free elections to promote democracy. In 1965, the United States intervened in the Dominican Republic again when the possibility of a communist takeover seemed possible. In that year, a leftist group supporting the overthrown, democratically elected president Juan Bosch seemed poised to place Bosch back in power.

A group of Dominican communists were involved in the revolt, and the U.S. deemed the threat of a Communist takeover to be too serious to be left alone. Moreover, when Bosch was first elected, the U.S. was concerned that despite being democratically elected, he might lead the nation into a communist government. In an attempt to prevent this, the United States sent in troops, a departure from the previous decades of Good Neighbor philosophy.

The United States justified its actions in the Dominican Republic (as it had justified the interventions in Cuba in the years prior) as a violation of the principles of the Monroe Doctrine; legislators also resolved to extend the Monroe Doctrine specifically to allow intervention if tensions in the Dominican Republic escalated.

== Doctrine ==
The Johnson Doctrine reinforced the U.S. government's existing doctrines against socialist and communist expansion. In his May 2 address, Johnson specifically stated that the American countries would not permit the establishment of another "communist government" in the Western Hemisphere. Johnson contextualized the proclamation through the lens of the revolution in the Dominican Republic, citing the various factions of the revolution. Johnson continued to praise the Dominican government and explain that his intention was domestic defense.

The Johnson Doctrine builds off the Kennedy and Eisenhower doctrines in that it opposes communism in the Western Hemisphere. It also parallels the Monroe Doctrine, with an emphasis on denouncing non-U.S. (in this case socialist) interference in the Americas.

Moscow Strategic Doctrine The Johnson Doctrine having been built off the Kennedy and Eisenhower doctrines in that it opposes communism in the Western Hemisphere that doctrine being the Moscow Strategic Doctrine. The Moscow Strategic Doctrine has been studied by Dr. Thomas B. Larson and Alexander J. Dallin and from their findings found that the doctrine faces more upon Soviet arms control policies during the Khrushchev era. During the time of 1964 to 1965 when Dr. Larson and Mr. Dallin published their findings they came upon the key assumption in this doctrine is that due to an imbalance in strategic weapons favoring the United States, the Soviet Union had since redressed the balance in this category for strategic weapons namely in ICBMs during this time as well as showing negative views on arms limitations and arms control agreements between the U.S. and the Soviets.

Eisenhower Doctrine: Middle East The Eisenhower Doctrine is a build off for what the Johnson Doctrine is and has its own way of dealing with communism. An example of the Eisenhower Doctrine in effect would be in the Middle East in 1957 when the United States declared that they would distribute economical and military aid, and if necessary use military force to drive out communism. In securing the Middle East, Eisenhower applied his doctrine in 1957 and 1958 by sending money to the Kingdom of Jordan, encouraging Syrians to hold military operations against it, and deploy U.S. troops to Lebanon to halt any radical changes. The doctrine showed a major commitment and a new resolve for the U.S. in securing stability in the Middle East and their influence in international affairs, thus Eisenhower raised the prospects of the U.S. fighting in the Middle East and taking responsibility over it for decades to come.

Johnson Doctrine: Latin America In Latin America, the Johnson Doctrine takes after the Eisenhower Doctrine in a way of how it was to deal with communism. In 1965 Johnson sent over 20,000 troops to the Dominican Republic under the idea that the United States and other nations would not allow a communist government to foster in the Western Hemisphere. Although Johnson's actions were seemingly multilateral it was more unilateral, and its actions were justified through the Organization of American States (OAS) after military action was enacted. However, by acting unilaterally and through Johnson's "Johnson Doctrine" the U.S. had violated the OAS prohibition on any American state from intervention of any kind on any other state for any reason. This action also violated the nonintervention pledge that had been a key part in Roosevelt's Good Neighbor Policy.

Monroe Doctrine: Cuba and the Dominican Republic The Johnson Doctrine follows the same precepts of the Monroe Doctrine in protecting Latin American owned territories, which was set up in 1823, in how it revived it as well as bring controversy with. The Cuban Economic Independence with the Soviet Union, the discovery and removal of Soviet missiles, and Cuban infiltration of Latin America prompted debate over the controversy and status of the Monroe Doctrine. One thought that was maintained was that Fidel Castro and the Soviet Union both defied and violated the Monroe Doctrine and that the doctrine should be invoked upon Cuba. It was also contended that the doctrine needed to be revived and restored before this. An example would be during the 1962 Cuban Missile Crisis which formulated a committee for the doctrine of conservatives dissatisfied with the president's policy. This committee's major objective was to get Congress to pass a joint resolution to reaffirm the doctrine, and in 1963 the House of Representatives presented a resolution that Soviet troops in Cuba violated the doctrine. Two years later Congressman Daniel J. Flood requested for House support "to extend" the doctrine fearing things might erupt in the Caribbean, while Congressman Armistead I. Selden proposed a resolution that gave the United States unilateral force in Latin America against communism which violated "the principles" of the doctrine.

== Legacy ==
Map of U.S. involvement in regime change in Latin America

Following the implementation of the Johnson Doctrine, the United States has continued to intervene in international affairs. In Latin America, the U.S. intervened to prevent perceived threats from leftist forces; some confirmed interventions included Operation Condor in the 1970s, support of the Contras in Nicaragua, and the invasion of Grenada in 1983.

U.S. interventions have also included involvement in regime changes, military support, and invasions of countries outside of the Western Hemisphere; for example, the United States has lent support to Ukraine following the Russian invasion of Ukraine. Furthermore, the U.S. maintains a military presence in countries around the world in addition to providing foreign aid to support American interests.

== See also ==
- Brezhnev Doctrine
- Interventionism (politics)
- Monroe Doctrine
- Red Scare
