= Roosevelt Corollary =

Early 20th-century U.S. foreign policy regarding Latin America

- December 1904 – 1934
American imperialism	Good neighbor policy
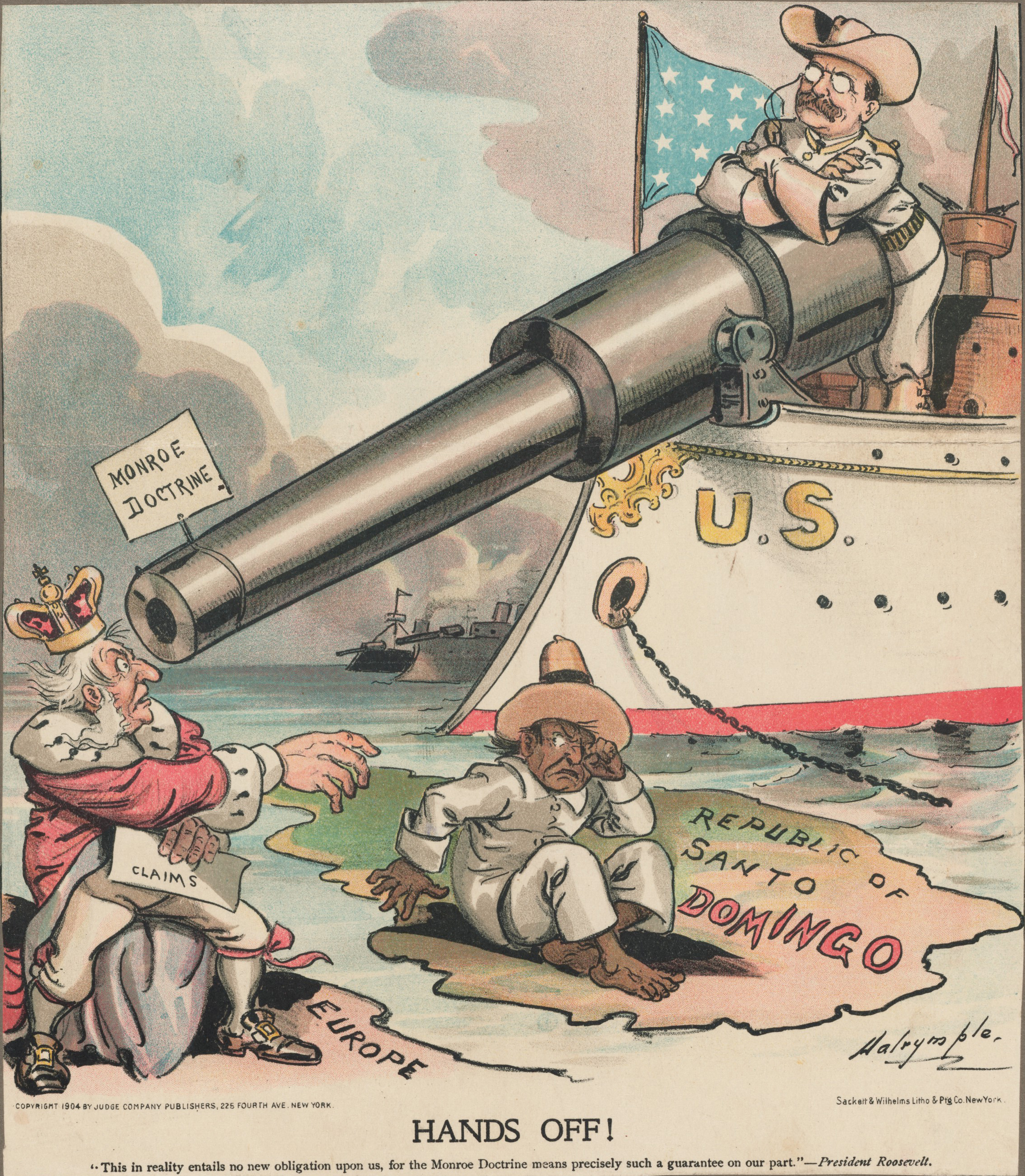
- Location: Western Hemisphere, Caribbean
- Key events: Venezuelan Crisis (1902–1903); US occupation of the Dominican Republic (1905); Monroe Doctrine Connection: The Roosevelt Corollary was a direct amendment that shifted the original Monroe Doctrine (1823) from a policy of passive European non-intervention to active American military intervention, asserting the US right to act as an "international police power."

In the history of United States foreign policy, the Roosevelt Corollary was an addition to the Monroe Doctrine articulated by President Theodore Roosevelt in his 1904 State of the Union Address, largely as a consequence of the Venezuelan crisis of 1902–1903. The corollary states that the United States could intervene in the internal affairs of any Latin American country guilty of "chronic wrongdoing, or an impotence which results in a general loosening of the ties of civilized society".

Roosevelt tied his policy to the Monroe Doctrine, and it was also consistent with the foreign policy included in his big stick ideology. He stated that in keeping with the Monroe Doctrine, the U.S. was justified in exercising "international police power" to put an end to chronic unrest or wrongdoing in the Western Hemisphere. President Herbert Hoover in 1930 endorsed the Clark Memorandum that repudiated the Roosevelt Corollary in favor of what was later called the Good Neighbor policy.

== Background ==
The Roosevelt Corollary was articulated in the aftermath of the Venezuelan crisis of 1902–1903. In late 1902, Britain, Germany, and Italy imposed a naval blockade of several months against Venezuela after President Cipriano Castro refused to pay foreign debts and damages suffered by Europeans in a recent civil war. The dispute was referred to the International Court of Arbitration at The Hague, which concluded on 22 February 1904 that the blockading powers involved in the Venezuela crisis were entitled to preferential treatment in the payment of their claims. This left other countries which did not take military action, including the United States, with no recourse. The U.S. disagreed with the outcome in principle, and Roosevelt saw the need to take action politically. The corollary went towards ensuring that U.S. interests abroad were protected from, in future, European powers using this ruling at The Hague as justification for military action and/or occupation in Central and Latin America.

There were many contributing factors to the assertion of the Roosevelt Corollary in 1904, including both physical events such as the Venezuelan crisis and mentalities that existed within the U.S. that shaped the foreign policy of the period. Anti-European sentiment amongst Americans built up following the preferential treatment that the International Court of Arbitration awarded the European powers. This contributed to the domestic political situation in which Roosevelt was shaping his corollary, making the introduction of the corollary harder to sell to the American public, especially as few people had any true understanding of the importance of the U.S. in international affairs.

Even the long-existing concept of manifest destiny, which was commonly used during the expansion of the United States' western frontier, came into play to build the Roosevelt Corollary. Manifest destiny by the early 20th century had become an expression of American exceptionalism, whereby the U.S. had superior virtue and a duty to help 'lesser' states in their development. Roosevelt showed longer-lasting ideas of the U.S. being the police state for the Western Hemisphere than is seen simply in the Venezuelan crisis, with him asserting in his 1901 annual message that international police duty "must be performed for the sake of the welfare of mankind". Therefore, the Roosevelt Corollary was largely shaped and created as a result of the ruling of the Venezuelan crisis, but there were still underlying and previously seen ideas and domestic mentalities that contributed to its form.

== Content ==
The Roosevelt Corollary, or the ideas it contained regarding the U.S. becoming the policeman of the Western Hemisphere, were first articulated by Secretary of State Elihu Root in a speech on 20 May 1904 and expanded on in Roosevelt's annual message to Congress on 6 December 1904:

All that this country desires is to see the neighboring countries stable, orderly, and prosperous. Any country whose people conduct themselves well can count upon our hearty friendship. If a nation shows that it knows how to act with reasonable efficiency and decency in social and political matters, if it keeps order and pays its obligations, it need fear no interference from the United States. Chronic wrongdoing, or an impotence which results in a general loosening of the ties of civilized society, may in America, as elsewhere, ultimately require intervention by some civilized nation, and in the Western Hemisphere the adherence of the United States to the Monroe Doctrine may force the United States, however reluctantly, in flagrant cases of such wrongdoing or impotence, to the exercise of an international police power.

While the Monroe Doctrine had been verbal and defensive in warning European powers to keep their hands off countries in the Americas, Roosevelt changed this into an aggressive military "obligation" of the U.S. to intervene in Latin America to maintain stability in these areas. Where the Monroe Doctrine had been asserted in the early 19th century when the European powers looked to recolonize in the Western Hemisphere, the Roosevelt Corollary nearly a century later looked to once again promote the U.S. in Latin America. The corollary contributed to the transition of the United States into a great power after the Spanish–American War, which largely marked the start of the U.S. expanding its interest in states beyond its own borders, promoting its influence and ideas abroad. By expanding on the Monroe Doctrine, rather than creating a whole new policy, Roosevelt was able to justify more easily the U.S. exercising "international police power" to put an end to wrongdoing in the Western Hemisphere, as a more limited version of the corollary already existed in the Monroe Doctrine, despite the shift from verbal to active intervention.

== Use ==
Though the Roosevelt Corollary was an addition to the Monroe Doctrine, it could also be seen as a departure. While the Monroe Doctrine states that European countries should stay out of Latin America, the Roosevelt Corollary takes this further to say the United States had the right to exercise military force in Latin American countries to keep European countries out. Historian Walter LaFeber writes:

[Roosevelt] essentially turns the Monroe Doctrine on its head and says the Europeans should stay out, but the United States has the right, under the doctrine, to go in to exercise police power to keep the Europeans out of the way. It is a very nice twist on the Monroe Doctrine, and of course, it becomes very, very important because over the next 15 to 20 years, the United States will move into Latin America about a dozen times with military force, to the point where the United States Marines become known in the area as "State Department Troops" because they are always moving in to protect State Department interests and State Department policy in the Caribbean. So what Roosevelt does here, by redefining the Monroe Doctrine, turns out to be very historical, and it leads the United States into a period of confrontation with peoples in the Caribbean and Central America, that was an imperative part of American imperialism.

=== Dominican Republic ===
U.S. intervention in the Dominican Republic is generally seen as the first true use of the Roosevelt Corollary. The case arose due to the San Domingo Improvement Company (SDIC), a New York company, taking over the Dominican Republic's finances in 1893. This brought the interests of the U.S. and Dominican Republic closer together, and so when in 1897, the SDIC defaulted on its payments to European bondholders, the Dominican Republic fell into economic disaster, leading to the U.S. calling for arbitration on the case. The arbitration established a payment schedule from the Dominican Republic to the SDIC, with the U.S. being able to collect the money from the Dominican Republic for the SDIC if it failed to pay, thereby expanding U.S. interests in the Dominican even further. The U.S. did end up having to become involved in debt collection from the Dominican Republic when they defaulted on payments and European powers threatened to intervene. In 1905, the U.S. sent in warships and demanded the customs house be turned over to U.S. negotiators, who used proceeds to pay foreign creditors.

The case exemplifies the power that the U.S. was able to exert in the Americas as a result of the Roosevelt Corollary, with the U.S. taking action to prevent European powers becoming involved in debt collection via their usual methods, such as blockades. It gave the U.S. an advantage through which it was able to control the internal situations of countries, including the Dominican Republic, to its benefit, even if this meant European powers waited longer for their repayments. This model—in which U.S. advisors worked to stabilize Latin American nations through temporary protectorates, staving off European action—became known as "dollar diplomacy". The Dominican experiment, like most other "dollar diplomacy" arrangements, proved temporary and untenable, and the United States launched a larger military intervention in 1916 that lasted to 1924.

=== Other areas ===
U.S. presidents also cited the Roosevelt Corollary as justification for intervention in Cuba (1906–1909), Nicaragua (1909–1910, 1912–1925, and 1926–1933), Haiti (1915–1934), and the Dominican Republic (1916–1924). Although the main rationale for the corollary was to keep Europe from meddling in the Western Hemisphere, other intentions were hidden to retain the United States' reputation. Many other benefits such as the acquisition of raw materials and new markets attracted Roosevelt. These gains can be seen in the copious amount of sugar in Cuba or the abundant oil in Nicaragua.

== Shift to the "Good Neighbor" policy ==
In 1928, President Calvin Coolidge issued the Clark Memorandum, often seen as a partial repudiation of the Roosevelt Corollary, which states that the U.S. did not have the right to intervene when there was a threat by European powers. President Herbert Hoover also helped to move the U.S. away from the imperialist tendencies of the Roosevelt Corollary by embarking on good-will tours, withdrawing troops from Nicaragua and Haiti, and abstaining from intervening in the internal affairs of neighboring countries.

In 1934, President Franklin D. Roosevelt further renounced interventionism and established his "Good Neighbor policy" that led to the annulment of the Platt Amendment by the Treaty of Relations with Cuba in 1934, and the negotiation of compensation for Mexico's nationalization of foreign-owned oil assets in 1938. Indeed, leaving unchallenged the emergence of dictatorships like that of Fulgencio Batista in Cuba, Rafael Trujillo in the Dominican Republic, Anastasio Somoza in Nicaragua, and François Duvalier in Haiti were each considered to be "Frankenstein dictators" due to the mishandlings of the American occupations in the countries.

The era of the Good Neighbor policy ended with the start of the Cold War in 1945, as the U.S. felt there was a greater need to protect the Western Hemisphere from Soviet influence. In 1954, Secretary of State John Foster Dulles invoked the Monroe Doctrine and the Roosevelt Corollary at the Tenth Pan-American Conference in Caracas, denouncing the intervention of Soviet communism in Guatemala. This was used to justify Operation PBSuccess that deposed President Jacobo Árbenz and installed a military dictatorship under Carlos Castillo Armas, the first in a series of military dictators in the country.

== Historians' perspectives ==
Historians Cyrus Veeser and Matthias Maass present a positive view of the Roosevelt Corollary. Veeser sees it as a part of the transition into the progressive era of American politics, with Roosevelt working towards combining U.S. foreign policy goals with private economic activity abroad, as seen with the SDIC in the Dominican Republic. He also uses the ideas of David Pletcher to back his ideas, showcasing the role that the Roosevelt Corollary played in transforming American foreign policy from the "uncertainty" and "improvisation" seen in the late nineteenth century to the "executive-driven, interventionist strategies" of the early twentieth century. This shift aided the U.S. in their goal for becoming a global power. Maass is equally complimentary of the role played by the Roosevelt Corollary, which he sees as being an updated version of the Monroe Doctrine suited to the modern circumstances of global imperialism. Although he acknowledges that it wasn't necessarily a foregone conclusion, the political, economic, and military climate in the Americas at the beginning of the twentieth century made a declaration from the U.S. vital if they were to become the main police power of the Western Hemisphere and ward off European intervention in what they deemed their territory.

Critics, such as American professor and linguist Noam Chomsky, lie in-between the positive interpretations and avid opponents of the Roosevelt Corollary. He argues that the Roosevelt Corollary was merely a more explicit imperialist threat, building on the Monroe Doctrine, indicating that the U.S. would not only intervene in defense of South America in the face of European imperialism but also use its muscle to obtain concessions and privileges for American corporations, giving a more balanced view of an advanced Monroe Doctrine that was able to benefit the U.S. in their hemisphere.

There are obvious differences between the Monroe Doctrine, which focused on defense of the Americas, and the Roosevelt Corollary that asserted U.S. power and ensured they were able to advance their own goals for U.S. gain. Historian Serge Ricard of the University of Paris argues that these differences are significant and that the Roosevelt Corollary did not simply escalate the Monroe Doctrine. Rather, the Roosevelt Corollary was "an entirely new diplomatic tenet that epitomized his 'big stick' approach to foreign policy." Ricard continues that the Corollary shows the United States' righteous and paternalistic views towards Central and Latin America, which it used to justify its foreign interference and enforcement of economic principles that the U.S. deemed to be secure and right for such states.

In other words, while the Monroe Doctrine sought to bar entry to the European empires, the Roosevelt Corollary arguably indicated the United States' intention to take their place. It could also be pointed out how the corollary violates the principles of self-determination and sovereignty that are noted in the Declaration of Independence. Roosevelt was a figure who embodied many American values: he was a war hero, an individualist, and a man of the common people. Yet his decision to take action in Latin America contradicts with the ideas enshrined in international law, which became a target for criticism.

== See also ==
- Johnson Doctrine
- Donroe Doctrine
- Bush Doctrine
- Drago Doctrine
- History of the United States (1865–1917)
- New Imperialism
- Territorial evolution of the United States
- Neoconservatism

== General bibliography ==
- Coyne, C. J., Davies, S. (2007). "Empire: public Goods and Bads." Econ Journal Watch, 4(1), 3–45.
- Glickman, Robert Jay. Norteamérica vis-à-vis Hispanoamérica: ¿opposición o asociación? Toronto: Canadian Academy of the Arts, 2005. ISBN 0-921907-09-5.
- Meiertöns, Heiko (2010). The Doctrines of US Security Policy – An Evaluation under International Law, Cambridge University Press, ISBN 978-0-521-76648-7.
- Mitchell, Nancy. The Danger of Dreams: German and American Imperialism in Latin America (1999).
- Mitchener, Kris James, and Marc Weidenmier. "Empire, public goods, and the Roosevelt Corollary", Journal of Economic History (2005) 64#5 pp. 658+
- Rabe, Stephen G. "Theodore Roosevelt, the Panama Canal and the Roosevelt Corollary: Sphere of Influence Diplomacy", ch. 16 in Serge Ricard, ed., A Companion to Theodore Roosevelt (2011)
- Ricard, Serge. "The Roosevelt Corollary". Presidential Studies 2006 36(1): 17–26. ISSN 0360-4918 Fulltext: in Swetswise and Ingenta
- Ricard, Serge. "Theodore Roosevelt: Imperialist or Global Strategist in the New Expansionist Age?" Diplomacy & Statecraft (2008) 19#3 pp. 639–657.
- Sexton, Jay. The Monroe Doctrine: Empire and Nation in Nineteenth-Century America (Macmillan, 2011.)
