= World War Foreign Debts Commission Act =

- Long title: An Act to create a commission authorized under certain conditions to refund or convert obligations of foreign Governments held by the United States of America, and for other purposes.
- Nicknames: World War Foreign Debts Commission Act of 1922
- Enacted by: the 67th United States Congress

Citations
- Public law: Pub. L. 67–139
- Statutes at Large: 42 Stat. 363, Chap. 47

Legislative history
- Introduced in the House as H.R. 8762 by Joseph W. Fordney (R–MI); Passed the House on October 24, 1921 (200-117); Passed the Senate on January 31, 1922 (39-26); Agreed to by the House on February 3, 1922 (299-27); Signed into law by President Warren G. Harding on February 9, 1922

Major amendments
- Pub. L. 67–455, 42 Stat. 1325, February 28, 1923; Pub. L. 68–327, 43 Stat. 763, January 21, 1925

World War Foreign Debts Commission Act is a United States statute authorized February 9, 1922 endorsing a commission, working under Secretary of the Treasury Andrew Mellon, to negotiate repayment agreements with Great Britain and France in the aftermath of World War I.

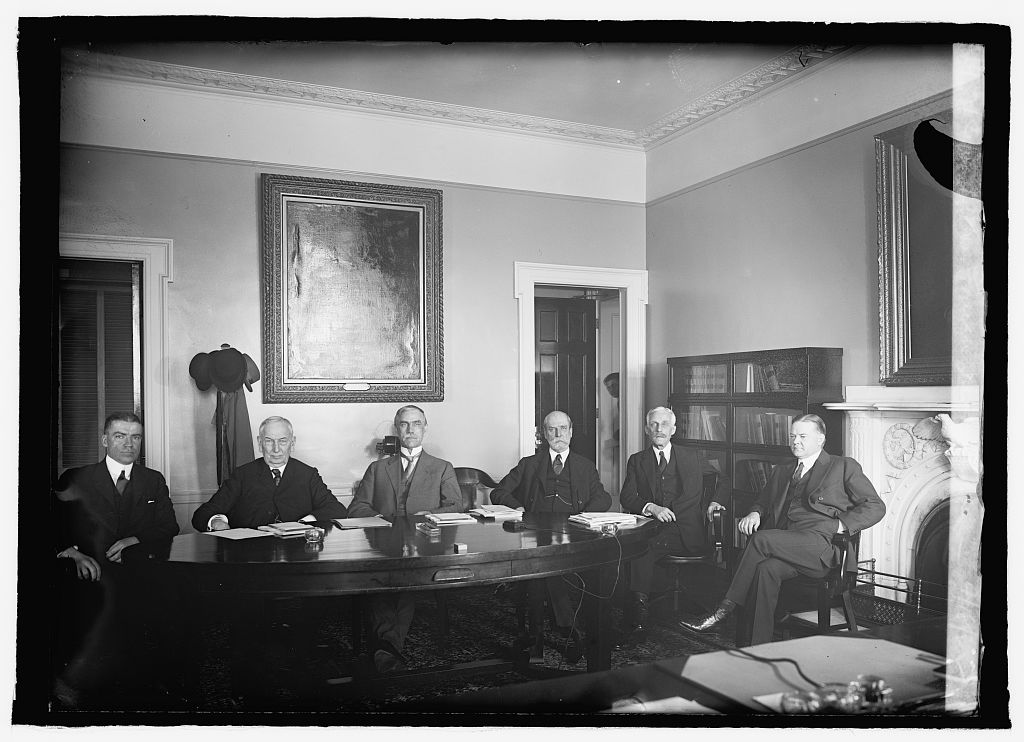
First meeting of the World War Foreign Debt Commission (April 18, 1922)

The Commission placed the Allied debt principal to the United States at $11 billion. Payments were to be made in graduated 62 annual installments but the accrued interest on these payments over a period of 62 years would have increased the debt to approximately $22 billion, although the U.S. did agree to lowered interest rates. Great Britain's debt was reduced 19.7% to $4.6 billion with the interest rate reduced from 5% to 3% for the first ten years of payment to be raised to 3½% thereafter. France's debt was reduced by 52.8% to $4 billion, without any interest for the first five years of payment. It was then to be increased gradually to 3½%.

== See also ==
- Blood Swept Lands and Seas of Red
- Mellon–Berenger Agreement
- Repudiation of debt at the Russian Revolution

== Bibliography ==
- "The World's War Debt; A Record and Analysis of the Financial Obligations Left by the War, In their Relation to the World at Large". Internet Archive. Mechanics and Metals National Bank. January 1919. OCLC 801036657.
- "Secretary of the Treasury Submitting a Copy of the Report of the World War Foreign Debt Commission" [Settlement of the Indebtedness of the Republic of Finland to the United States of America] (PDF). United States Senate Committee on Finance. U.S. 68th Congress, First Session ~ Senate Document No. 23. United States Printing Office. May 2, 1923. OCLC 1329013582.
- Negotiations on behalf of the World War Foreign Debt Commission for the settlement or refunding of debts owed the United States by foreign governments (Documents 116–143)
- Hoffman, Frederick L. (July 1923). "Views on Questions of Reparations and War Debt Settlements: The Need for a Fact-Finding Commission". American Academy of Political and Social Science. 108. Sage Publications, Inc.: 60–73. JSTOR 1015112.
- Fisk, Harvey Edward (April 1924). "The Inter-Ally Debts: An Analysis of War and Post-War Public Finance, 1914-1923". HathiTrust Digital Library. Bankers Trust. OCLC 29079218.
- U.S. World War Foreign Debt Commission (1927). Combined Annual Reports of the World War Foreign Debt Commission with Additional Information Regarding Foreign Debts Due the United States, Fiscal years 1922, 1923, 1924, 1925, and 1926. U.S. Government Printing Office. OCLC 1049061910.
- Davis, Joseph Stancliffe (1928). "The War Debt Settlements". Virginia Quarterly Review. 4 (1). University of Virginia: 13–39. JSTOR 26434217.
- Stewart, Maxwell Slutz (September 28, 1932). "The Inter-Allied Debt: An Analysis". Internet Archive. Foreign Policy Association. OCLC 26341508.
- Elliston, Herbert B. (February 1938). "War Debts ― Not Dead, But Sleeping" (PDF). The Atlantic. The Atlantic Monthly Group. pp. 223–227.
- "Foreign Indebtedness to the United States" (PDF). United States Senate Committee on Finance. U.S. 93rd Congress, First Session ~ Senate Document No. 22-892. United States Printing Office. October 29, 1973. OCLC 805724.
- Complications for the United States from International Credits: 1913 -1940, George J. Hall Thomas J. Sargent, June 18, 2019

== U.S. Presidential Statements Concerning Foreign War Debt ==
- Peters, Gerhard; Woolley, John T. "Warren G. Harding: "Address to Congress on the Funding of Debt Owed by Great Britain and Aid to the Merchant Marine" February 7, 1923". The American Presidency Project. University of California - Santa Barbara.
- Peters, Gerhard; Woolley, John T. "Warren G. Harding: "Address on Foreign Policy and the International Court of Justice Intended for Delivery in San Francisco, California" July 31, 1923". The American Presidency Project. University of California - Santa Barbara.
- Peters, Gerhard; Woolley, John T. "Herbert Hoover: "Statement on France's Ratification of the Mellon-Berenger Agreement for Settling Its War Debt" July 28, 1929". The American Presidency Project. University of California - Santa Barbara.
- Peters, Gerhard; Woolley, John T. "Herbert Hoover: "Statement on Intergovernmental Debts" November 23, 1932". The American Presidency Project. University of California - Santa Barbara.
- Peters, Gerhard; Woolley, John T. "Franklin D. Roosevelt: "Message to Congress on the Payment of War Debts" June 1, 1934". The American Presidency Project. University of California - Santa Barbara.
- Roosevelt, Franklin D. (January 16, 1940). "Finland's War Debt". Franklin D. Roosevelt Library and Museum. United States Printing Office.
