= Thomson–Urrutia Treaty =

1921 treaty between Colombia and the United States

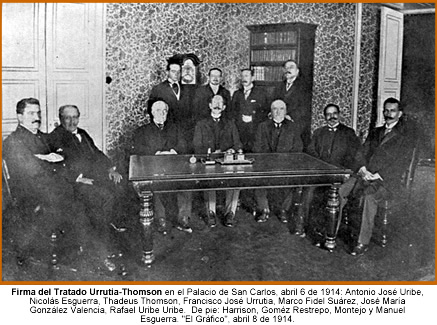
Signing the treaty, April 6, 1914.

The Thomson–Urrutia Treaty was ratified on April 20, 1921, between the United States and Colombia. Based on the terms of the agreement, the U.S. paid Colombia 25 million dollars in return for Colombia's recognition of Panama's independence. This resolved the United States support of the separation of Panama from Colombia in 1903.

It was successfully negotiated and signed by the U.S. on April 6, 1914, and ratified by Colombia on June 9 of that year. It was ratified by the US Senate on April 20, 1921.
