= Clark Memorandum =

American foreign policy position

Memorandum on the Monroe Doctrine
- from L to R: Don Mariano de Amoede y Galaremendi (Spanish Embassy, Washington); Under Secretary of State J. Reuben Clark; President Coolidge, speaking to King Alfonso; Walter S. Gifford, president of AT&T; and Joseph H. De Frees, chairman of the board, U.S. Chamber of Commerce. The man in the portrait above them is businessman Harry A. Wheeler, the first chairman of the Chamber.
- Created: December 17, 1928
- Commissioned by: Calvin Coolidge
- Author: J. Reuben Clark
- Media type: Print (Government memorandum)
- Subject: Monroe Doctrine, Roosevelt Corollary, foreign intervention in Latin America
- Purpose: Clarifying the unilateral scope of the Monroe Doctrine and separating it from the Roosevelt Corollary
- Supersedes: Roosevelt Corollary

Full text
- Memorandum on the Monroe Doctrine at Wikisource

The Clark Memorandum on the Monroe Doctrine or Clark Memorandum, written on December 17, 1928 by Calvin Coolidge's undersecretary of state J. Reuben Clark, concerned the United States' use of military force to intervene in Latin American nations. This memorandum was a secret until it was officially released in 1930 by the Herbert Hoover administration.

The Clark memorandum rejected the view that the Roosevelt Corollary was based on the Monroe Doctrine. However, it was not a complete repudiation of the Roosevelt Corollary but was rather a statement that any intervention by the U.S. was not sanctioned by the Monroe Doctrine but rather was the right of America as a state. This separated the Roosevelt Corollary from the Monroe Doctrine by noting that the Monroe Doctrine only applied to situations involving European countries. One main point in the Clark Memorandum was to note that the Monroe Doctrine was based on conflicts of interest only between the United States and European nations, rather than between the United States and Latin American nations.

Historian Gene Sessions says the memorandum said the Monroe Doctrine did not explicitly renounce rights of intervention in Latin America (as often stated). It had little if any influence on the development evolution of US Latin American policy.

== Conditions and details ==
During the late 1920s, a number of American foreign policy leaders started to argue for a softer tone in US relations with Latin American nations, which had been chafing under decades of intervention by the United States. Under secretary of State, and later Ambassador to Mexico, J. Reuben Clark (1871–1961) held these conciliatory views and completed work on the 236-page Memorandum late in the Coolidge administration. Clark argued the following:

- Every nation, including the United States, has the right of "self-preservation".
- The principle of self-preservation underlies the Monroe Doctrine.
- The United States alone makes the decision about when to intervene on behalf of Latin American nations.
- The Monroe Doctrine was not concerned with the relationship between the United States and other nations in the Americas, except when European interference in those nations threatened the security of the United States.
- The Doctrine relates to the relationship of the United States and Latin America on one side versus Europe on the other side, not of the United States on one side versus Latin America on the other side.
- The primary purpose of the Doctrine was to protect Latin American nations from intervention by European powers, not to victimize or oppress Latin American nations.
- The Roosevelt Corollary was not part of the Monroe Doctrine.
- The application of the Monroe Doctrine by the United States was beneficial to Latin American states.

While sometimes regarded as an outright repudiation of the Roosevelt Corollary, Clark was simply advancing his belief that the corollary was separate from the Monroe Doctrine and that American intervention in Latin America, when necessary, was sanctioned by U.S. rights as a sovereign nation, not by the Monroe Doctrine.

Clark's views were not made public until March 1930 during the Hoover administration, when Secretary of State Henry L. Stimson was guiding American diplomacy toward the beginning of a Good Neighbor Policy with its Latin American neighbors.

The memorandum also used the term "national security" in its first known usage.
