= Joseph Brown =

Joseph Brown may refer to:

== Arts and entertainment ==
- Victor Millan (Joseph Brown, 1920–2009), actor and theater professor
- Joe Brown (sculptor) (Joseph Brown, 1909–1985), American sculptor
- Joseph Brown (art collector) (1918–2009), Australian artist and art collector
- Joseph Epes Brown (1920–2000), author of the book The Sacred Pipe
- Joe E. Brown (Joseph Evans Brown, 1891–1973), American actor
- Joseph Brown (Coronation Street), a fictional character from the British soap opera

== Government and politics ==
- Joseph Brown (Missouri politician) (1823–1899), mayor of Alton and St. Louis, Missouri
- Joseph R. Brown (1805–1870), U.S. politician and Minnesota pioneer
- Joseph E. Brown (1821–1894), U.S. senator and governor of Georgia
- Joseph Tilley Brown (1844–1925), member of the Australian Parliament, 1906–1910
- Joe Brown (politician) (Joseph Edgar Brown, 1880–1939), U.S. representative from Tennessee
- Joseph Mackey Brown (1851–1932), governor of Georgia
- Joseph O. Brown (1848–1903), mayor of Pittsburgh
- Joseph Stanley Brown (1858–1941), private secretary to U.S. President James A. Garfield
- Joseph A. Brown (1903–1963), Michigan state senator
- Joseph D. Brown (born 1970), United States attorney in Texas
- Joseph N. Brown (1849–1922), member of the Mississippi Senate
- Joseph Ebert Brown (1888–1973), Baptist minister and state legislator in West Virginia

== Other people ==
- Joseph Brown (shipbuilder), builder of the USS Tuscumbia
- Joseph Brown (coach), Eastern Illinois University coach
- Joseph C. Brown (1784–1849), surveyor of the Louisiana Purchase
- Joseph Brown (astronomer) (1733–1785), United States industrialist and astronomer
- Joseph W. Brown (1793–1880), U.S. Army general and co-founder of the town of Tecumseh, Michigan
- Joseph Brown (cricketer) (1872–1915), English cricketer
- Joseph Brown (bishop) (1796–1880), Roman Catholic bishop in Wales
- Joseph Brown (engraver) (1809–1887), English engraver
- Joseph Brown (barrister) (1809–1902), English barrister
- Joseph "Black Joe" Brown (1750–1834), American Revolutionary War veteran
- Joseph Brown (discus thrower) (born 1996), American athlete
- Joseph Brown (physician) (1784–1868), English physician

== See also ==
- Joe Brown (disambiguation)
- Joseph Browne (disambiguation)
- James Joseph Brown (1854–1922), American mining engineer
