= Herbert Wolcott Bowen =

American diplomat and poet (1856–1927)

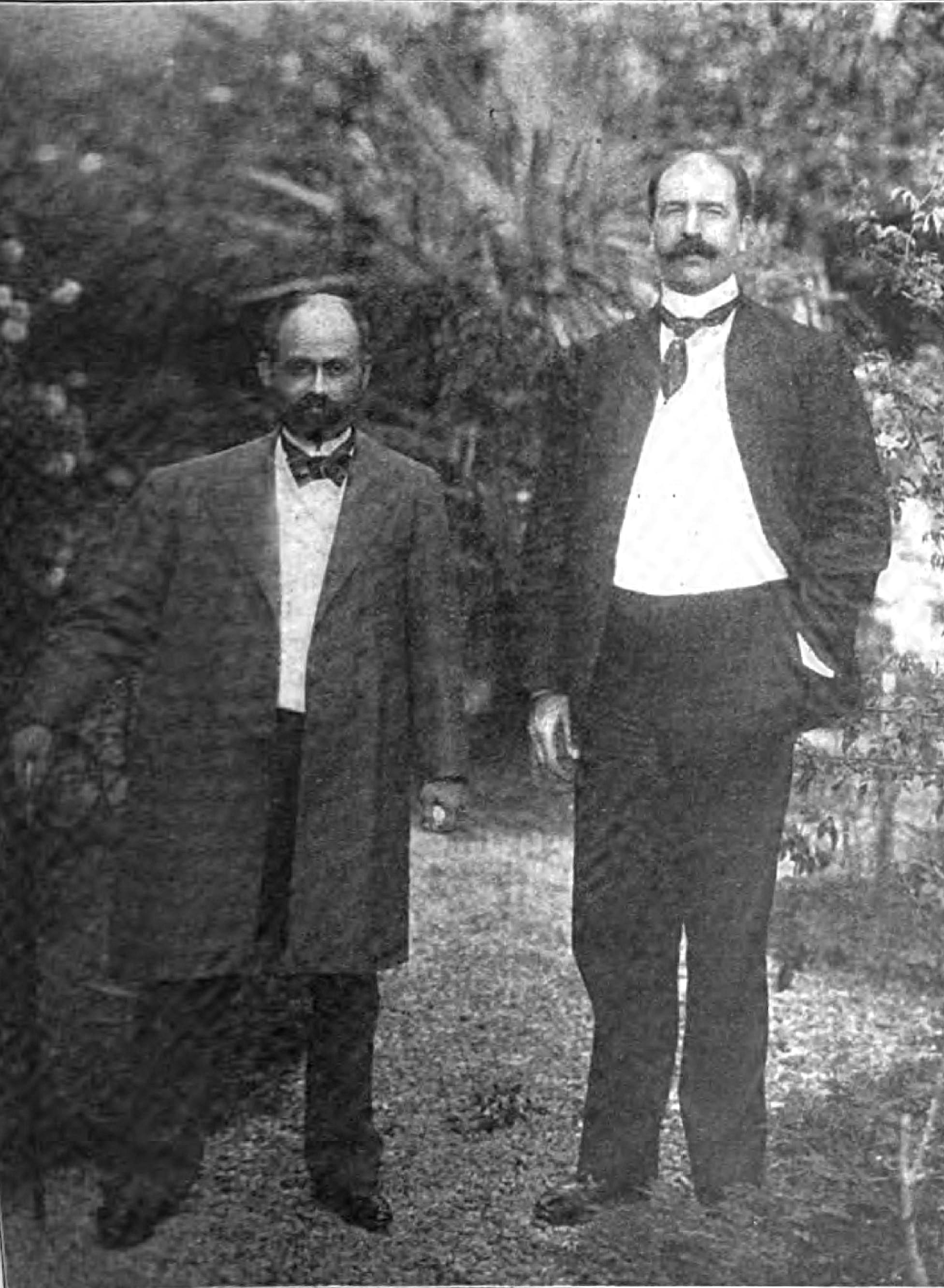
Cipriano Castro with Ambassador Bowen 1903

Herbert Wolcott Bowen (February 29, 1856 – May 29, 1927) was an American diplomat and poet. He served as ambassador to Venezuela, and consul-general in Spain and Iran.

== Early life and education ==
Bowen was born in Brooklyn, New York, in 1856, and graduated from Brooklyn Polytechnic Institute. He then attended Yale University as a graduate student but he did not graduate with his class. In 1881, Herbert received an L.L.B. in law and political science from Columbia Law School. He was awarded an honorary master's degree in 1903 from Yale University. Bowen published several volumes of poetry.

== Diplomatic career ==
After law school, Bowen practiced law in New York City specializing in international law.

=== Consul-general in Barcelona and Persia ===
In 1895, Bowen. was appointed by President Grover Cleveland as the American consul-general at Barcelona, Spain, where he served until 1899. Bowen was then appointed consul-general in Persia where he served from 1899 to 1901.

=== Minister to Venezuela ===
Bowen was appointed by U.S. President Theodore Roosevelt as envoy extraordinary and minister plenipotentiary to Venezuela in 1901.

After few days in Caracas, the Libertadora Revolution broke out. A coalition of regional caudillos, headed by the wealthy banker Manuel Antonio Matos and allied with transnational corporations, tried to overthrow President Cipriano Castro. After the conflict ended in victory for Castro, British, German and Italian fleets imposed a naval blockade on Venezuelan ports over Castro's refusal to pay external debts and damages suffered by European citizens in the conflict. After naval bombardments of La Guaira and Puerto Cabello, Castro jailed all British, German and Italian immigrants in the country.

Bowen, as interim diplomatic representative of the European powers which had broken relations with Venezuela, negotiated the release of the foreign nationals.

Castro assumed that the Monroe Doctrine would see the United States prevent European military intervention in American hemisphere, but (per the Olney interpretation) President Roosevelt saw the Doctrine as concerning European seizure of physical territory only. Roosevelt also was concerned with the threat of penetration into the region by Germany.

On December 17, 1902, Venezuelan Foreign Minister Rafael Lopez Baralt requested that Bowen serve as arbitrator in the dispute over the bombardment of Fort San Carlos. The fort had been bombarded by German battleships trying to enter Lake Maracaibo. The ships began firing without approval from British Commodore Robert Archibald James Montgomerie, who had been previously warned against provoking the Venezuelans by firing without approval from the British Admiralty. The Germans and British claimed that the Venezuelans fired first, though the British declared the bombardment "unfortunate and inopportune." The German Foreign Office claimed the attempted entry to Maracaibo was motivated by a desire to cut off supply lines from neighboring Colombia.

After the Fort San Carlos incident and increasingly negative British and American press reactions to the Germans' conduct, President Roosevelt called for international arbitration in Washington. Bowen participated as a representative of the Venezuela government to refinance the debt and signed the Washington Protocols on their behalf in February 1903. Roosevelt also informed the German Ambassador that Admiral George Dewey had orders to be ready the Caribbean fleet to sail from Puerto Rico to Venezuela at an hour's notice. This resolution was an early application of the Roosevelt Corollary, Big Stick policy, and dollar diplomacy in Latin America.

When Bowen returned to Caracas in January 1904, he noted a more peaceful and secure milieu. Castro reassured him that United States–Venezuela relations were at a high point. However, the Castro regime delayed fulfilling the agreements in Washington Protocols. Bowen lost confidence after verifying the participation of American corporations in the attempted overthrow of Castro. The Venezuelan government demanded compensation of 50 million bolivars from the corporations, but they refused to pay.

Bowen was dismissed in 1905 for impropriety.

== Personal life ==
Bowen married Augusta Floyd Vingut on 26 February 1895 at a high society wedding in New York performed by Roman Catholic archbishop Michael Corrigan. After divorce Bowen married second wife, Carolyn Mae Clegg (1877–1949).

Bowen died May 29, 1929.
