= Venezuelan crisis of 1902–1903 =

Naval blockade from December 1902 to February 1903

Venezuelan naval blockade of 1902–1903
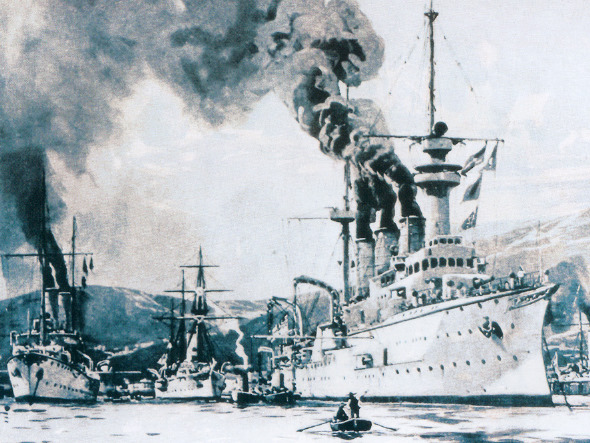
- Engraving by Willy Stöwer depicting the blockade
Date	9 December 1902 – 19 February 1903
Location	Venezuela
Result	Compromise: Venezuelan debt dispute resolved; European fleet withdraws

Belligerents
Venezuela	United Kingdom; Germany; Italy

The Venezuelan crisis of 1902–1903 (Note: Sometimes called the "second Venezuelan crisis", the crisis of 1895–1897 being the first.) was a naval blockade imposed against Venezuela by Great Britain, Germany, and Italy from December 1902 to February 1903, after President Cipriano Castro refused to pay foreign debts and damages suffered by European citizens in recent Venezuelan civil wars. Castro assumed that the American Monroe Doctrine would see Washington intervene to prevent European military intervention. However, at the time, United States president Theodore Roosevelt and his State Department saw the doctrine as applying only to European seizure of territory, rather than intervention per se. With prior promises that no such seizure would occur, the U.S. was officially neutral and allowed the action to go ahead without objection. The blockade saw Venezuela's small navy quickly disabled, but Castro refused to give in, and instead agreed in principle to submit some of the claims to international arbitration, which he had previously rejected. Germany initially objected to this, arguing that some claims should be accepted by Venezuela without arbitration.

Years later, Roosevelt claimed he forced the Germans to back down by sending his own larger fleet to Venezuela and threatening war if the Germans landed. However, he made no preparations for war against a major power, nor did he alert the Senate or officials at the State, War, and Navy Departments.

With Castro failing to back down, U.S. pressure and increasingly negative British and American press reaction to the affair, the blockading nations agreed to a compromise, but maintained the blockade during negotiations over the details. This led to the signing of an agreement on 13 February 1903 which saw the blockade lifted, and Venezuela commit 30% of its customs duties to settling claims.

When the Permanent Court of Arbitration in The Hague subsequently awarded preferential treatment to the blockading powers against the claims of other nations, the U.S. feared this would encourage future European intervention. The episode contributed to the development of the Roosevelt Corollary to the Monroe Doctrine, asserting a right of the United States to intervene to stabilize the economic affairs of small states in the Caribbean and Central America if they were unable to pay their international debts, in order to preclude European intervention to do so.

== Background ==
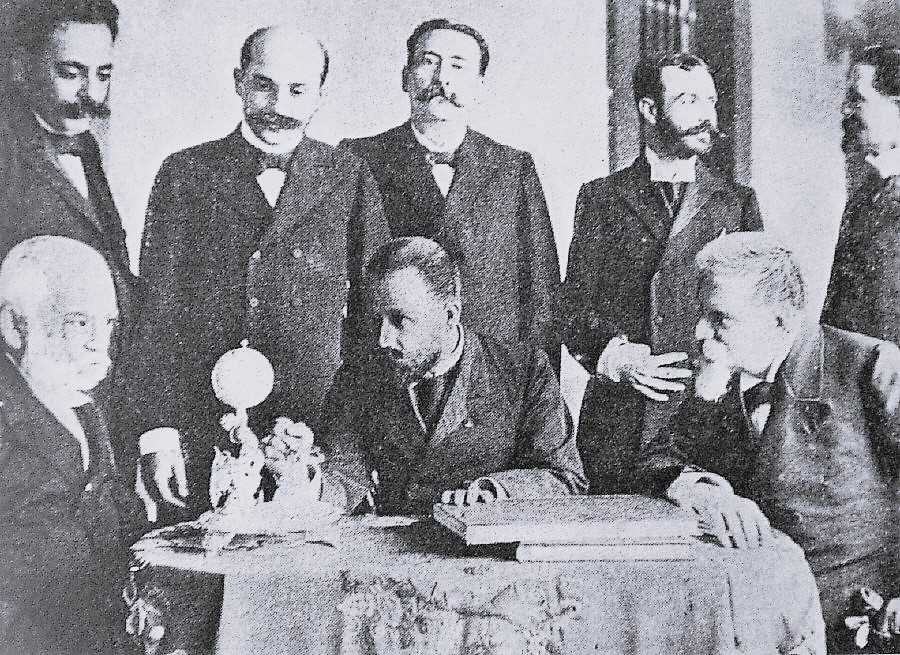
Cipriano Castro and his war cabinet in 1902

At the turn of the 20th century, German traders dominated Venezuela's import/export sector and informal banking system. Most of these, however, had little influence in Berlin; rather it was German industrialists and bankers, including those associated with building railroads, who had connections and influence. The revolutionary turmoil of the last decade of the 19th century in Venezuela saw these suffer, and send "a stream of complaints and entreaties for protection" to Berlin. Matters were particularly bad during the Venezuelan Civil War of 1892 which had brought Joaquín Crespo to power, which saw six months of anarchy with no effective government, but the Civil War of 1898 again saw forced loans and the taking of houses and property.

Importantly, in 1893, the French, Spanish, Belgian and German envoys in Caracas had collectively agreed that joint action was the best route for settling claims from 1892's civil war, although this had not been necessary in that event because reparations related to that conflict were paid out.

Prior to the Civil War of 1898, while German investment in Venezuela was substantially less than in countries such as Argentina or Brazil, Krupp's Great Venezuela Railway Company was valued at 60 million marks, and was "individually one of the more valuable German South American ventures"; and despite a renegotiation of the concession terms in 1896, Venezuelan payments were irregular after 1897 and stopped in August 1901. Additionally the signing of the Paris award that decided the boundary issue with British Guiana on 3 October 1899 there were insurrectional movements during Ignacio Andrade's administrative management and serious economic difficulties were experienced - motivated by the international drop in the price of coffee, that represented more than 80% of Venezuela's exports. In addition, Cipriano Castro, one of a succession of Venezuelan caudillos (military strongmen) to seize the Presidency, halted payment on foreign debts after seizing Caracas in October 1899. Britain had similar grievances, and was owed the bulk of the nearly $15 million of debt Venezuela had incurred in 1881 and then defaulted on.

In July 1901, Germany urged Venezuela in friendly terms to pursue international arbitration via the Permanent Court of Arbitration in The Hague. Between February and June 1902 the British representative in Venezuela sent Castro 17 notes about the British government's concerns, but did not receive a reply to any of them. Castro assumed that the Monroe Doctrine would see the U.S. intervene to prevent European military intervention. However, U.S. President Theodore Roosevelt saw the Doctrine as applying to European seizure of territory, rather than intervention per se. In July 1901, as Vice-President, Roosevelt said that "if any South American country misbehaves toward any European country, let the European country spank it", and reiterated that view to Congress as President on 3 December 1901.

== Preparations ==
It remains in dispute how the Anglo-German cooperation on Venezuela came about, with varying opinions as to the source of the initiative. (Note: Nancy Mitchell writes that "To assert that either party took the initiative and to dig feverishly through the archives for proof ignores the subtlety of life. In this decision, the question of who took the initiative is buried forever in innuendo, in inference, in the tone of voice, the raised eyebrow that leaves no paper trail." (Mitchell 1999:71)) In mid-1901, with the distraction of the Boxer Rebellion gone, German Chancellor Bernhard von Bülow decided to respond to the German concerns in Venezuela with some form of military intervention, and discussed with the German navy the feasibility of a blockade. Admiral Otto von Diederichs was keen, and recommended occupying Caracas if a blockade failed. However, disagreements within the German government over whether a blockade should be pacific (permitting neutral ships to pass) or martial (enabling them to be seized) caused delays, and in any case the German Emperor, Kaiser Wilhelm II, was unconvinced regarding military action. Nonetheless, in late 1901 a renewed demand for reparations was backed up by a show of naval strength, with SMS Vineta and Falke sent to the Venezuelan coast. In January 1902 the Kaiser declared a delay to any blockade due to the outbreak of Libertadora revolution in Venezuela (led by financier Manuel Antonio Matos) which raised the possibility of a more amenable government than of Cipriano Castro. (Note: There were also tactical reasons for a delay, in the view of the German navy. "In April Venezuela was hot and unhealthy and in June it was wet; and, further, after the coffee harvest in March Venezuela's trade was at its quietest and a blockade would therefore be less damaging. The whole affair should be deferred until October". Forbes (1978:326))

British Empire (Red), German Empire (Black), Italy (Green), and Venezuela (Gold) two years before the crisis in 1900.

Complicating matters were rumours "rampant in the United States and in England" that Germany wanted Margarita Island as a South American naval base; however a May 1900 visit by the German cruiser SMS Vineta had concluded it was unsuitable for these purposes, and the German navy had become more conscious of how vulnerable such far-flung bases would be. In late 1901, the British Foreign Office became concerned that Britain would look bad if it failed to defend its citizens' interests while Germany took care of theirs, and began sounding out the Germans about a possible common action, initially receiving a negative response. By early 1902, British and German financiers were working together to pressure their respective governments into action. The Italians, who had begun to suspect the existence of plans to enforce debts, also sought to be involved, but Berlin refused. Their participation was agreed to by the British "after Rome had shrewdly pointed out that it could repay the favor in Somalia". The Italians quickly sent the armoured cruiser Carlo Alberto and the protected cruisers Giovanni Bausan and Elba toward the Venezuela coast.

In June 1902, Castro seized a British ship, The Queen, on suspicion of aiding rebels, in another phase of the Venezuelan civil war. This, together with Castro's failure to engage with the British through diplomatic channels, tilted the balance in London in favor of action, with or without German cooperation. By July 1902, the German government was ready to return to the possibility of joint action, with Matos' insurrection having led to further abuses against German citizens and their property, including by government forces. In mid-August, Britain and Germany agreed in principle to go ahead with a blockade later in the year. In September, after the Haitian rebel ship Crête-à-Pierrot hijacked a German ship and seized weapons destined for the Haitian government, Germany sent the gunboat SMS Panther to Haiti.

Panther soon found the ship and declared that it would sink it, after which the rebel Admiral Hammerton Killick, after evacuating the crew, blew up his ship and himself with it, assisted by fire from Panther. There were concerns about how the United States would view the action in the context of the Monroe Doctrine, but despite its legal advice describing the sinking as "illegal and excessive", the State Department endorsed the action, and The New York Times declared that "Germany was quite within her rights in doing a little housecleaning on her own account". Similarly, the British acquisition of the island of Patos, in the mouth of the Orinoco between Venezuela and the British dependency of Trinidad and Tobago, seemed to cause no concern in Washington, even though as a territorial claim it "skirted dangerously close to challenging the Monroe Doctrine". On 2 November, after the heavy defeat of the Revolution in the siege of La Victoria, the vast network of armies and its extraordinary power were weakened, being a wound that could not be recovered. After that international capital decided to move from opposing operations to direct intervention, and in this way they began to strangle the national economy.

On 11 November, during Kaiser Wilhelm's visit to his uncle King Edward VII at Sandringham House, an "iron-clad" agreement was signed, albeit leaving key details unresolved beyond the first step of seizing Venezuela's gunboats. The agreement specified that matters with Venezuela should be resolved to the satisfaction of both countries, precluding the possibility of Venezuela making a deal with just one. The agreement was motivated not least by German fears that Britain might withdraw from action and leave Germany exposed to U.S. anger. The British press reaction to the deal was highly negative, with the Daily Mail declaring that Britain was now "bound by a pledge to follow Germany in any wild enterprise which the German government may think it proper to undertake". In the course of 1902 the U.S. received various indications from Britain, Germany, and Italy of an intention to take action, with the U.S. declaring that as long as no territorial acquisition were made, it would not oppose any action. The British minister in Venezuela emphasized the need for secrecy about the plans, saying that he thought the U.S. minister would leak warning to Castro, which would give Castro the opportunity to hide Venezuela's gunboats up the Orinoco River.

On 7 December 1902, both London and Berlin issued ultimatums to Venezuela, even though there was still disagreement about whether to impose a pacific blockade (as the Germans wanted) or a war blockade (as the British wanted). Germany ultimately agreed to a war blockade, and after receiving no reply to their ultimatums, an unofficial naval blockade was imposed on 9 December with SMS Panther, SMS Falke, SMS Gazelle and SMS Vineta as major Kaiserliche Marine warships in Caribbean Sea. On 11 December, Italy offered its own ultimatum, which Venezuela also rejected. Venezuela maintained that its national laws were final, and said "the so-named foreign debt ought not to be and never had been a matter of discussion beyond the legal guaranties found in the law of Venezuela on the public debt".

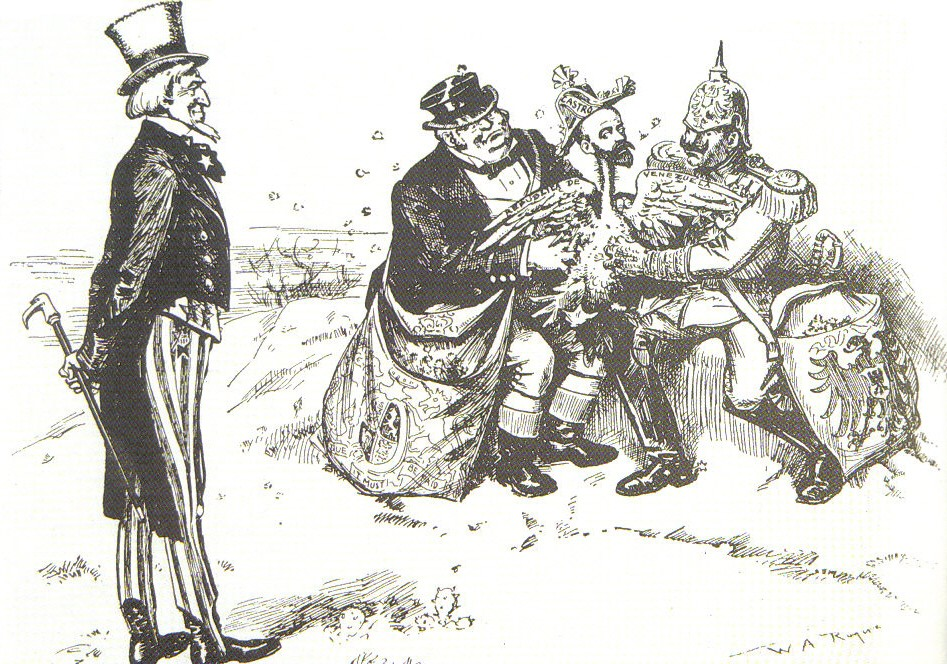
Caricature of Cipriano Castro, by William Allen Rogers, published in the New York Herald, in January 1903

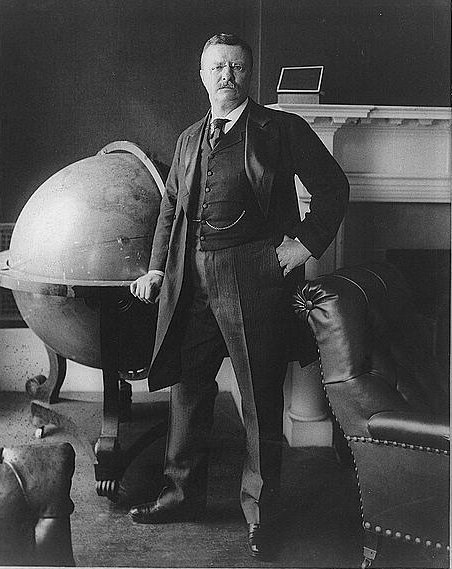
US President Theodore Roosevelt (1903)

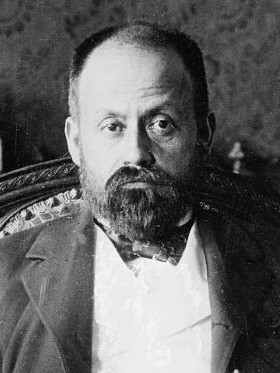
Venezuelan President Cipriano Castro (1903)

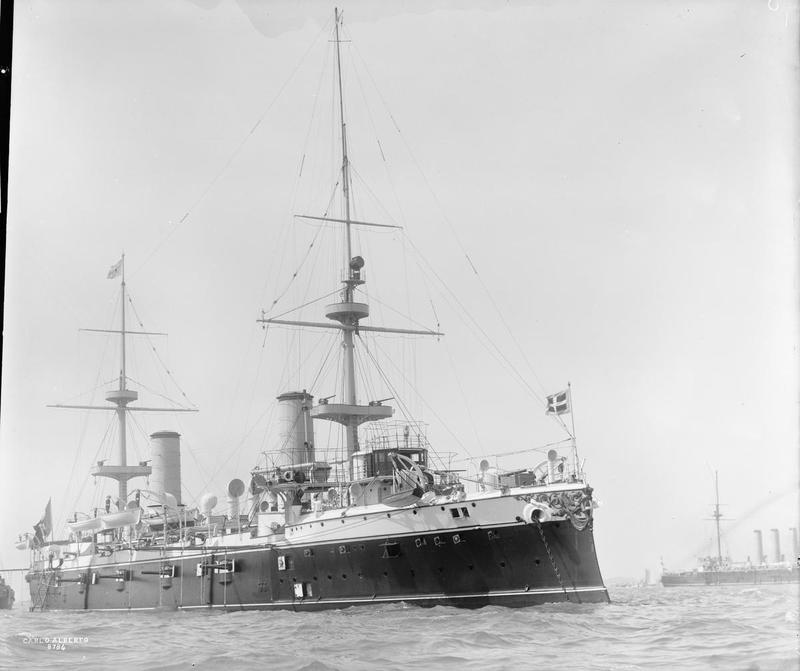
Italian cruiser Carlo Alberto

== Blockade ==
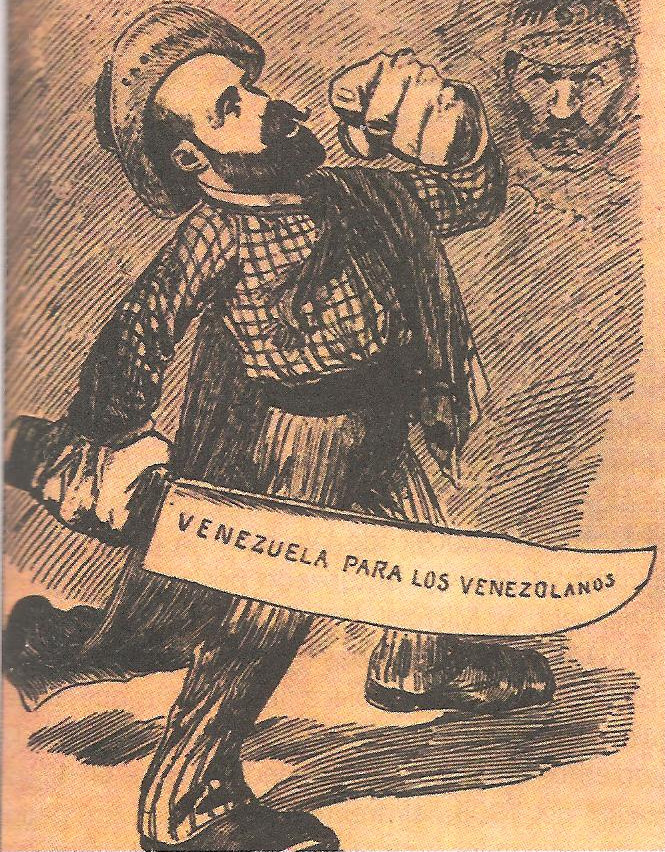
Cartoon published by the Venezuelan press during the crisis. Cipriano Castro, with a machete reading "Venezuela para los venezolanos" ("Venezuela for the Venezuelans"), raises a fist at Wilhelm II.

The German naval contingent (numbering four, compared to British eight) followed the British lead in operational terms. On 11 December 1902, Gazelle boarded the old gunboat Restaurador in the port of Guanta. The gunboat was towed at anchor and put into service by the German Captain-Lieutenant Titus Türk with crew members of Gazelle as SMS Restaurador. The ship returned to Venezuela on 23 February 1903; after extensive repairs she was in much better condition than on capture.

The British ships of the Particular Service Squadron under Commodore Robert A.J. Montgomerie included the flagship HMS Ariadne, the sloop HMS Alert and the protected cruiser HMS Charybdis. An Italian naval contingent arrived in support of the blockade on 16 December. The blockaders captured four Venezuelan warships, with the Venezuelan navy providing little challenge. Virtually all its ships were captured within two days. The Germans, lacking the capacity to tow them to Curaçao, simply sank two Venezuelan ships that proved unseaworthy. On land, Castro arrested over 200 British and German residents of Caracas, prompting the allies to deploy soldiers to evacuate their citizens. The U.S. ambassador Herbert W. Bowen negotiated the release of all foreign nationals.

On 13 December, after a British merchant vessel had been boarded and its crew briefly arrested, the British demanded an apology, and failing to receive it, launched a bombardment of Venezuelan forts at Puerto Cabello, assisted by the German SMS Vineta. The same day, London and Berlin received from Washington a request forwarded from Castro to submit the dispute to arbitration, which neither power relished, because of concerns over enforceability of any settlement. In addition, Castro's offer initially covered only claims arising from the 1898 civil war, and made no mention of other claims. Germany believed that these claims should not be subject to arbitration, but London was more willing to agree, accepting arbitration in principle, and suggested a compromise. (Note: "Germany insisted on certain reservations: The [primary] claims would not be subject to arbitration and, in the case of the remaining claims, Venezuela would have to admit liability so that the court of arbitration would decide only on the 'material justification' and the 'means of the settlement'. In response, London suggested a modified agreement to Berlin in which the primary claims would not be subject to arbitration, but would instead be immediately paid or guaranteed by Venezuela. The remaining claims would then be dealt with through arbitration." Maass (2009)) The threat of arbitration made London move to the next stage in order to negotiate from a position of strength, and 20 December was set for the beginning of the official blockade. As a result of a combination of communications issues and practical delays, the British notice of an official blockade was published on 20 December, but the German blockade of Puerto Cabello was only effected on 22 December, and on Maracaibo on 24 December.

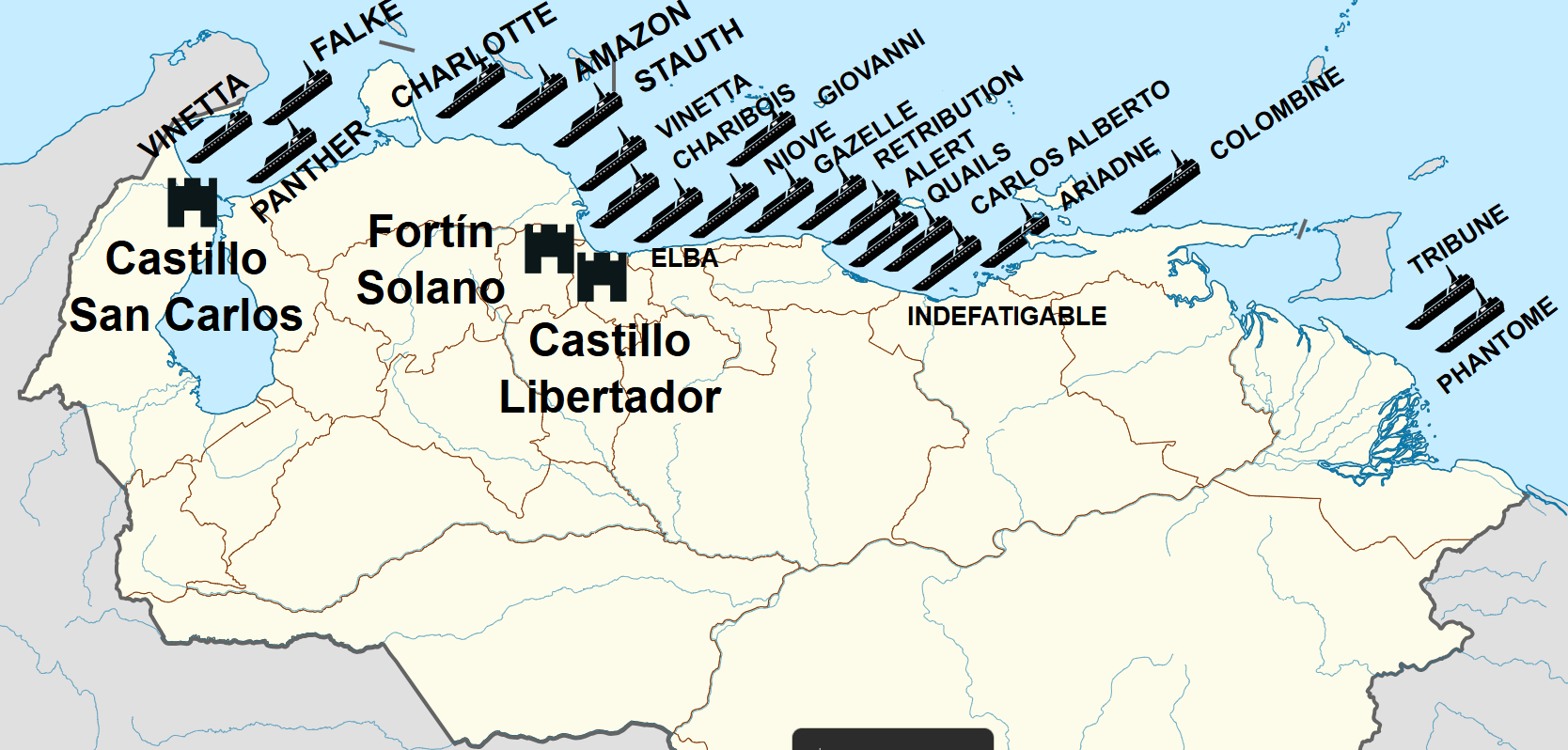
European warships involved on the blockade and Venezuelan fortifications.

Faced with the violence of the military actions that plunged the country into a serious international crisis, the rebels took advantage of the precarious situation of the government and on 20 December 1902, Amábilis Solagnie and Luciano Mendoza attacked the government positions in Caja de Agua, near Barquisimeto, where they expelled the troops of Leopoldo Baptista and González Pacheco. President Castro requested the intervention of President Roosevelt of the United States as a mediator in compliance with the Monroe Doctrine forcing the withdrawal of European ships.

In the meantime, whilst London and Berlin considered Castro's offer, American public opinion increasingly turned against the action, and there were references to the nearby presence of Admiral George Dewey's U.S. fleet, which was conducting long-planned exercises at Puerto Rico. Neither the British government nor the British press considered U.S. intervention a serious possibility. The U.S. did, after the December ultimatums to Venezuela, send an envoy to survey Venezuela's defensive capabilities, and thereby confirmed its confidence that the U.S. Navy could repel a German invasion. The publication of a British government White Paper, revealing the nature of the "iron-clad" agreement, infuriated the British press, not least because the yoking of British and German interests was considered dangerous, and unnecessary for the mere collection of some foreign debts. This was exemplified by Rudyard Kipling's polemic poem "The Rowers", published in The Times on 22 December as a response to the crisis; it included the words "a secret vow ye have made with an open foe ... a breed that have wronged us most ... to help them press for a debt!"

The Italian cruiser Elba was the first to arrive off the coast of La Guaira on December, and the following day the armed cruiser Giovanni Bausan and the armored cruiser Carlo Alberto arrived. Italy was tasked with the blockade of the port of Vela de Coro (Falcón State). Warships from the Netherlands, Belgium, and Spain also joined the blockade.

Britain unofficially told the United States on 17 December that it would accept arbitration in principle, and that Germany would soon agree too, as it did on 19 December. Castro's failure to back down left limited options in the face of the Monroe Doctrine, which would make any seizure of Venezuelan territory, even temporarily, problematic. In addition, the negative reaction in the British and American press had raised the costs of the intervention particularly for Germany, whose relations with the U.S. were more fragile than Britain's and who placed great value on the attitude of the British press. Germany had followed the British lead throughout the planning and execution of the operation, and as the British ambassador in Berlin observed, "The idea of arbitration did not smile on them, but they accepted it at once because we had proposed it".

A popular movement in support of Cipriano Castro is being felt in Latin America, but only the Argentine government expressly protests what has happened in the Caribbean sea when on 29 December the Minister of Foreign Affairs Luis María Drago in a diplomatic doctrinal note to the United States stated that simply failing to repay national debt was not a valid reason for foreign power intervention including the United States,

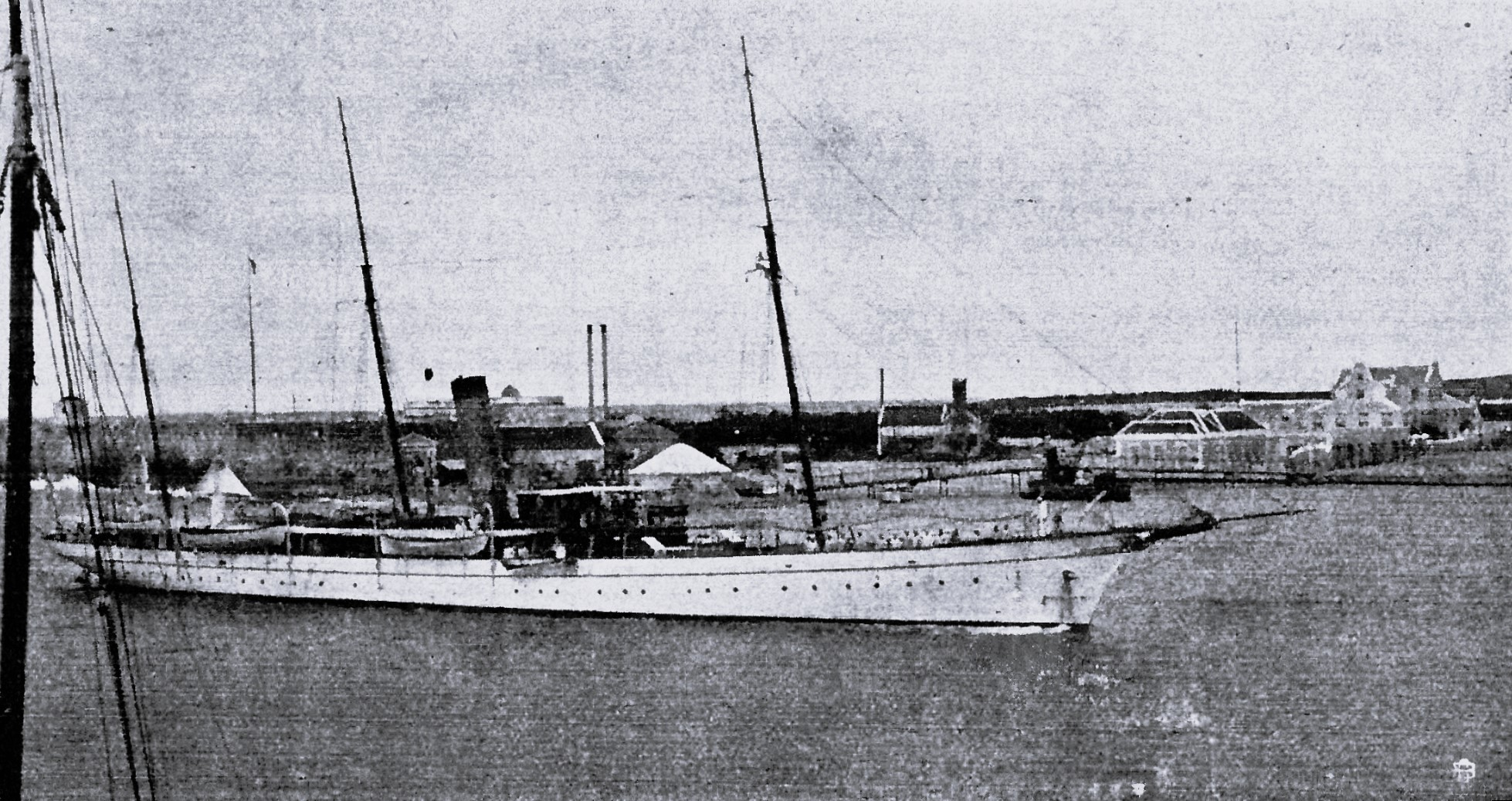
Restaurador in Curaçao

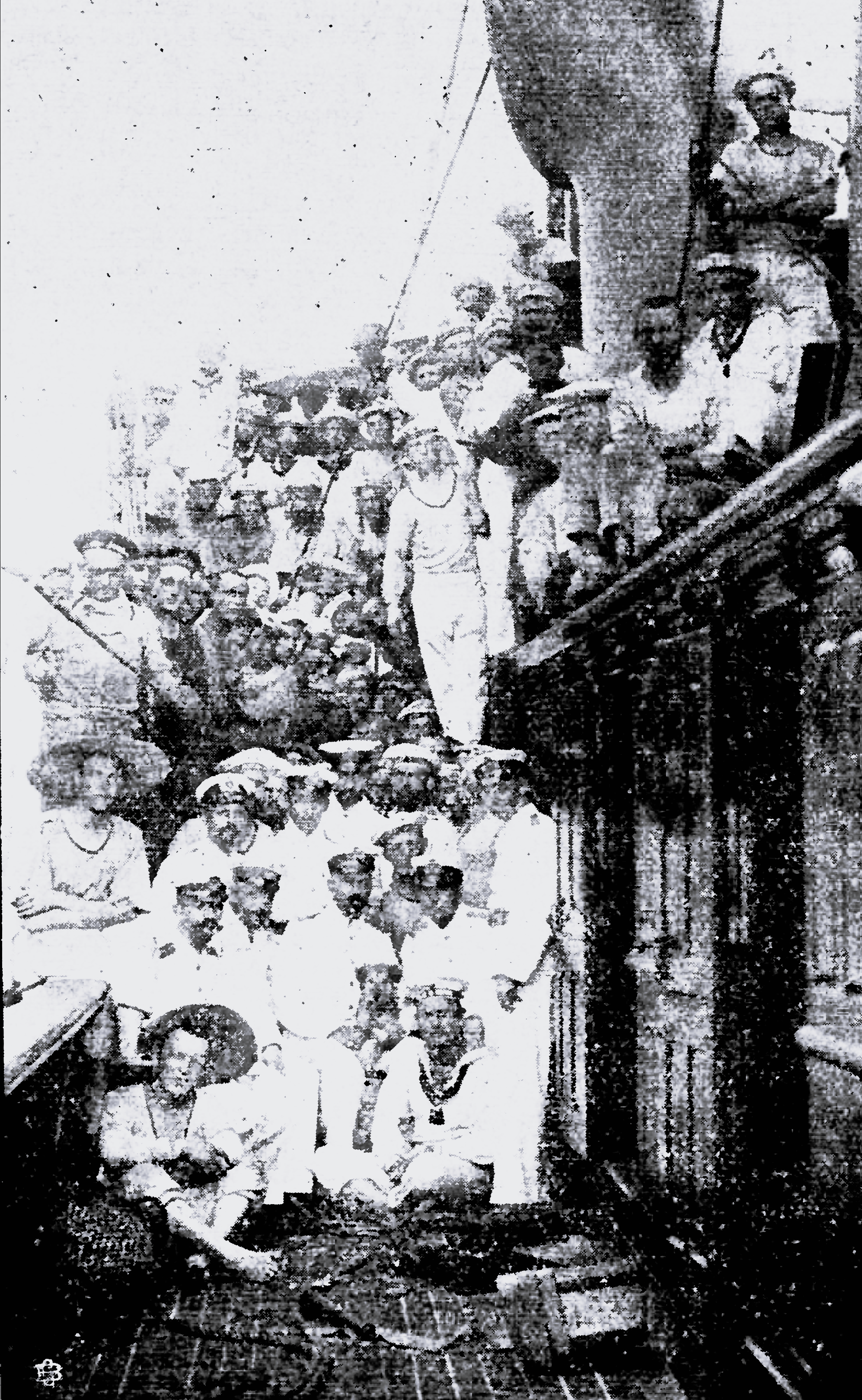
German crew with Lieutenant Commander Titus Türk (1902)

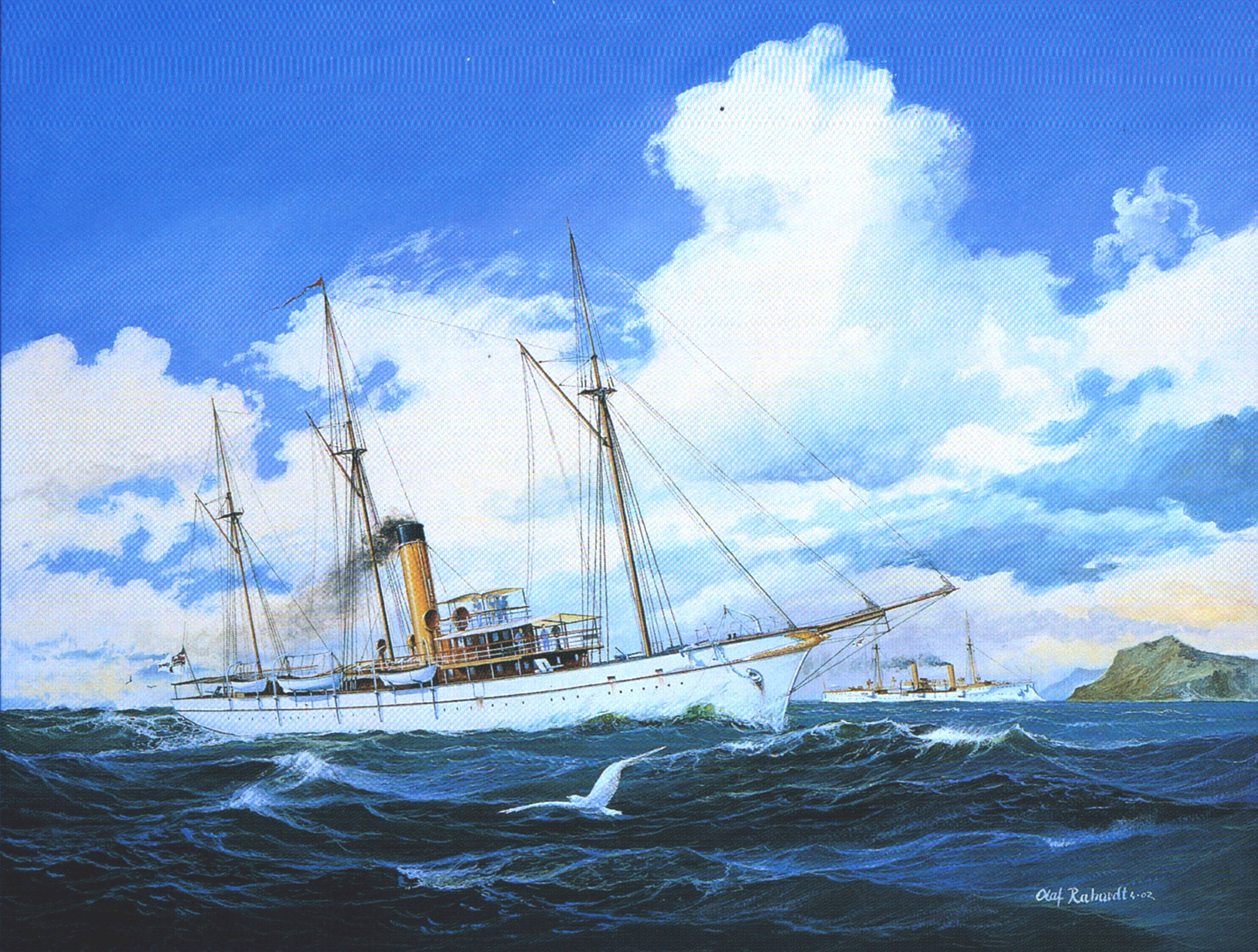
Restaurador, Olaf Rahardt

SMS Vineta in 1902

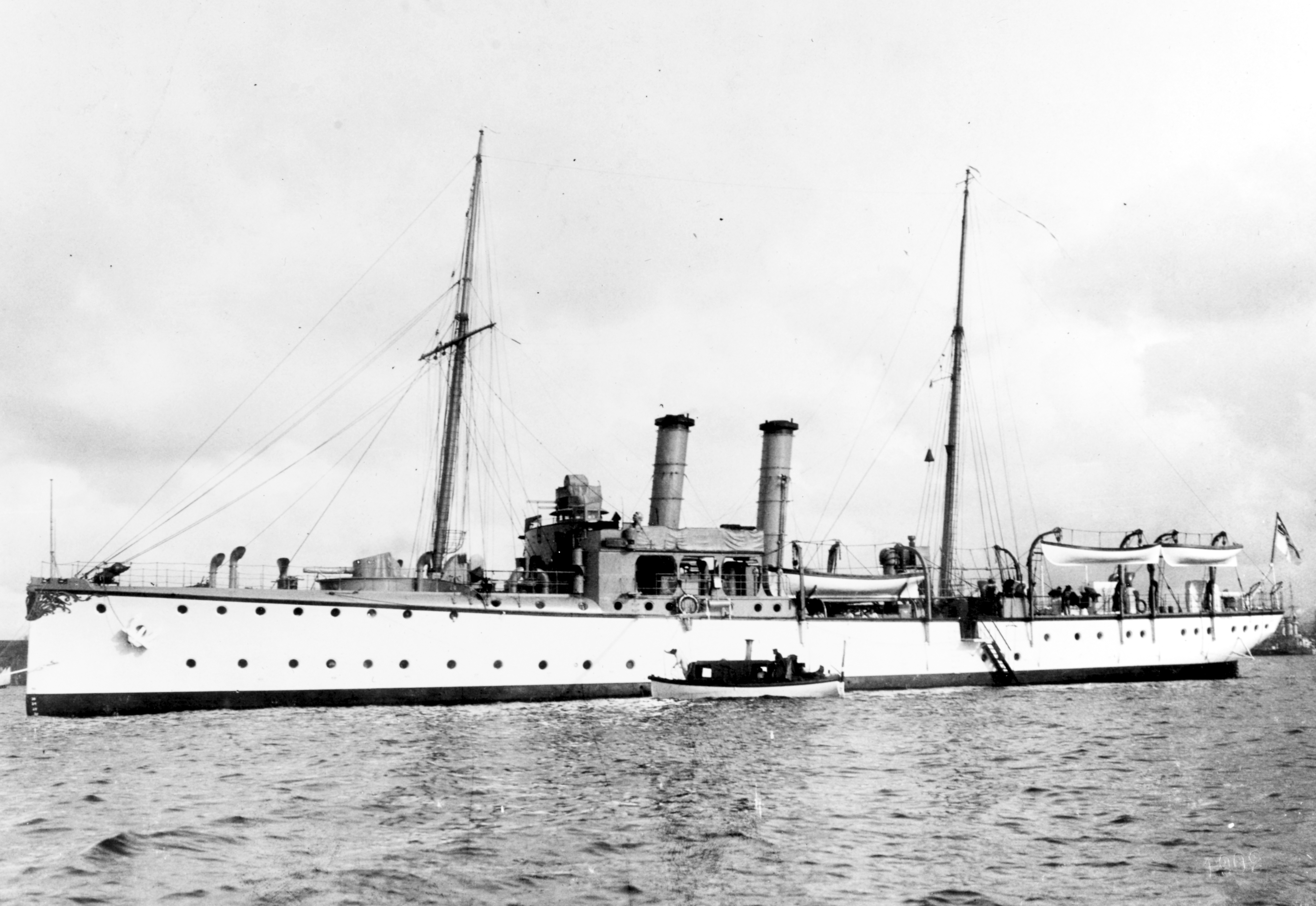
SMS Panther

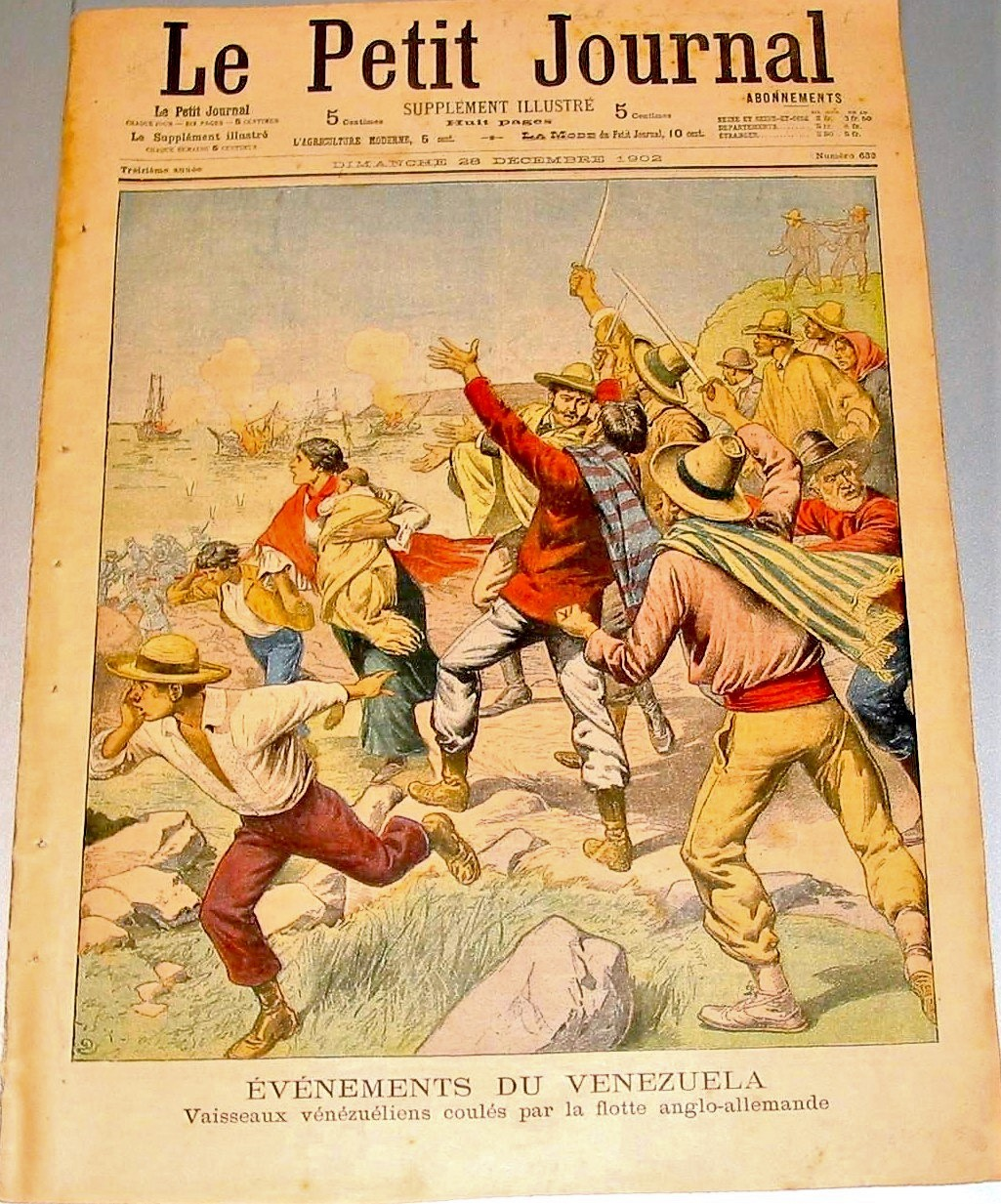
A cover of Le Petit Journal depicting the blockade of La Guaira, 1902

=== Uncertainty of Roosevelt's role ===
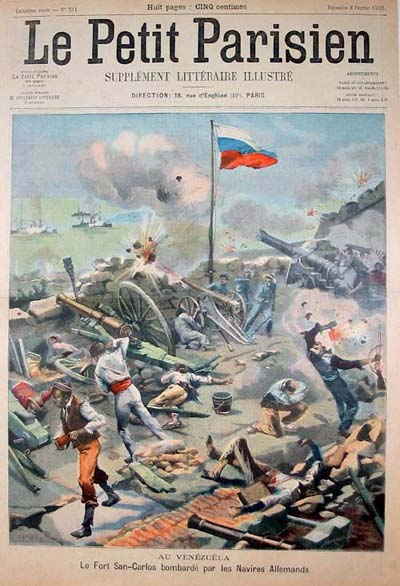
A cover of the Le Petit Parisien depicting the bombardment of Castle San Carlos

Fourteen years later (during the 1916 presidential campaign when he was calling for the United States to enter the World War against Germany), Roosevelt claimed that Germany's acquiescence to arbitration came from his threat to attack the German ships in Venezuelan waters using Dewey's fleet. Historians have been debating Roosevelt's veracity for a century. According to historian George C. Herring in 2011:

No evidence has ever been discovered of a presidential ultimatum. Recent research concludes, on the contrary, that although the Germans behaved with their usual heavy-handedness, in general they followed Britain's lead. The British, in turn, went out of their way to avoid undermining their relations with the United States. Both nations accepted arbitration to extricate themselves from an untenable situation and stay on good terms with the United States.

However historian Shaw Livermore says the Secretary of State's remarks "were as close to a direct threat as it was possible to come in diplomatic parlance". Roosevelt also claimed that Germany had intended to seize a Venezuelan harbor and establish a permanent German military base; and certainly the German representative in Venezuela is known to have had such ambitions. However, historical records suggest the German Kaiser had no interest in such a venture, and that motivations for the intervention lay with the insult to German prestige from Castro's actions. The Kaiser only gave the go ahead after being sure that Britain would play the lead role.

In January 1903, as the blockade continued during the negotiations, the German SMS Panther attempted to enter the lagoon of Maracaibo, a centre of German commercial activity. On 17 January it exchanged fire with the settlement of Fort San Carlos, but withdrew after half an hour, as shallow waters prevented it getting close enough to the fort to be effective. The Venezuelans claimed this as a victory, and in response the German commander sent Vineta, with heavier weapons, to set an example. On 21 January Vineta bombarded the fort, setting fire to it and destroying it, with the death of 25 civilians in the nearby town. The action had not been approved by the British commander, who had been told by Admiralty after the incident of 13 December not to engage in such action without consulting London; the message was not passed to the German commander, who had been told previously to follow the British commander's lead. The incident caused "considerable negative reaction in the United States against Germany"; the Germans said that the Venezuelans fired first, which the British concurred with but declared the bombardment "unfortunate and inopportune" nonetheless. The German Foreign Office said that Panther's attempted incursion into the lagoon of Maracaibo had been motivated by a desire to ensure the effective blockade of Maracaibo, by preventing Maracaibo from being supplied across the adjacent Colombian border. Subsequently, Roosevelt informed the German Ambassador that Admiral Dewey had orders to be ready to sail to Venezuela from Puerto Rico at an hour's notice.

== Outcome ==
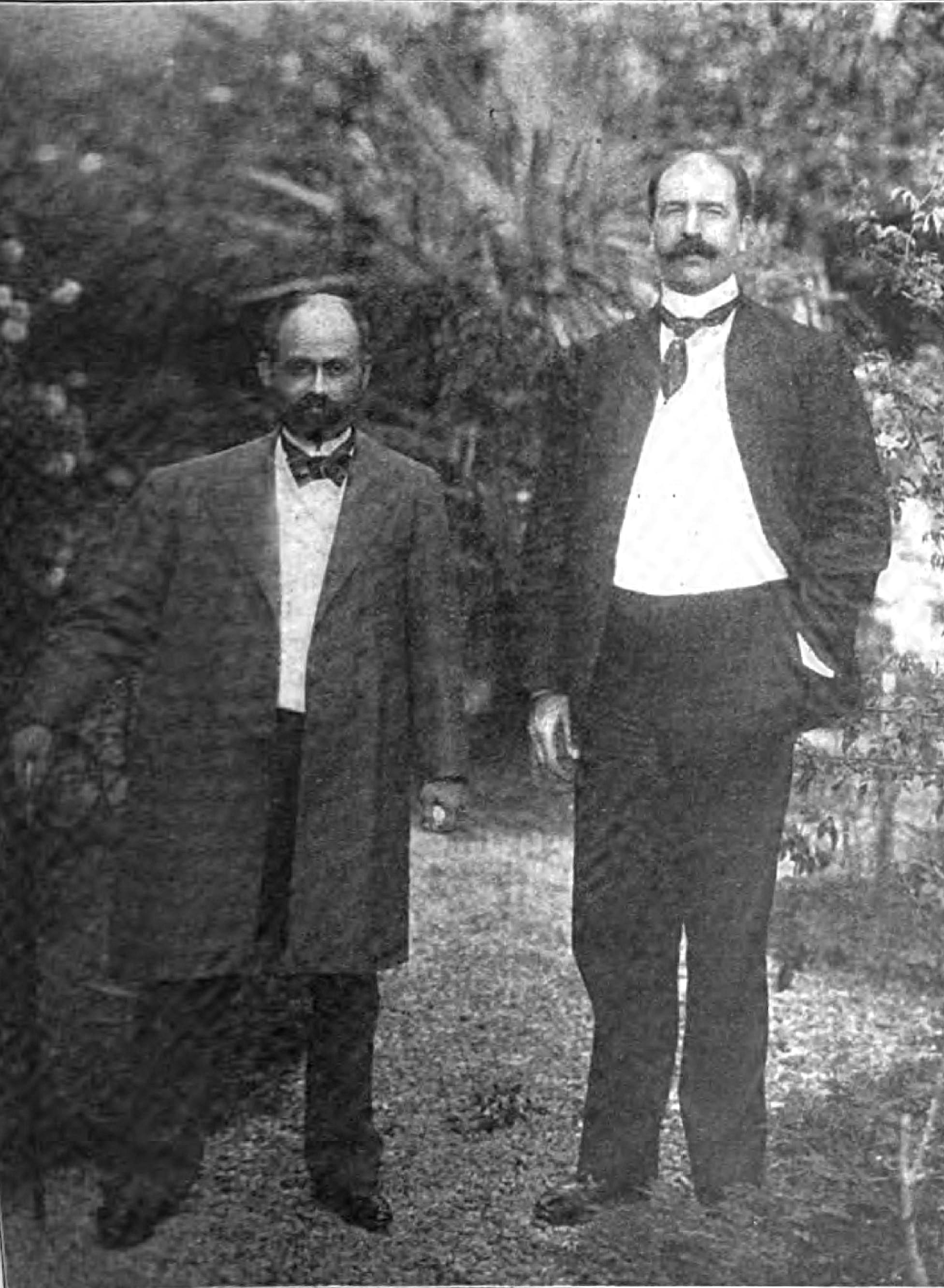
Cipriano Castro with U.S. Ambassador Herbert W. Bowen who signed the Washington Protocols as representative of the Venezuelan government, 1903

After agreeing to arbitration in Washington, Britain, Germany, and Italy reached a settlement with Venezuela on 13 February, resulting in the Washington Protocols. Venezuela was represented by the U.S. ambassador to Caracas Herbert W. Bowen. Venezuela's debts had been very large relative to its income, with the government owing Bs120 million in principal and Bs46m in interest (and another Bs186m claimed in war-related damages), and having an annual income of Bs30m. The agreement reduced the outstanding claims by Bs150m, and created a payment plan taking into account the country's income. Venezuela agreed in principle to pledge 30% of its customs income at its two major ports (La Guaira and Puerto Cabello) to the creditor nations. Each power initially received $27,500 (equivalent to $985,400 in 2025), with Germany promised another $340,000 (equivalent to $12,183,300 in 2025) within three months. The blockade was finally lifted on 19 February 1903. The Washington agreements foresaw a series of mixed commissions to adjudicate claims against Venezuela (of respectively one Venezuelan representative, one representative from the claimant nation, and an umpire), and these "worked, with a few exceptions, satisfactorily; their awards were accepted; and the dispute was widely regarded as settled."

However, the blockading nations argued for preferential treatment for their claims, which Venezuela rejected, and on 7 May 1903 a total of ten powers with grievances against Venezuela, including the United States, signed protocols referring the issue to the Permanent Court of Arbitration in The Hague.

The revolutionaries, bearing a wound that could not be healed, succumbing finally in July 1903 in the Battle of Ciudad Bolivar after the siege of government army conducted by General Juan Vicente Gomez, with which Matos decides to leave Venezuela, establishing itself in Paris.

Venezuela's relations with Germany, Italy, and the United Kingdom remained strained marked by mistrust, although diplomatic intervention by the United States helped resolve the crisis peacefully.

The Permanent Court of Arbitration in The Hague held on 22 February 1904 that the blockading powers were entitled to preferential treatment in the payment of their claims. Washington disagreed with the decision in principle, and feared it would encourage future European intervention to gain such advantage.

In June 1904 the American US Navy fleet made high-profile port calls to La Guaira, amid the diplomatic fallout of the Venezuelan crisis.

As a result, the Venezuelan crisis produced the Roosevelt Corollary described in President Roosevelt's 1904 message to Congress as a response to Drago Doctrine. The Corollary asserted a right of the United States to intervene to "stabilize" the economic affairs of small states in the Caribbean and Central America if they were unable to pay their international debts, in order to preclude European intervention to do so. The Venezuela crisis, and in particular the arbitral award, were key in the development of the Corollary.

In 1905, the United States sent US Navy warships to Dominican Republic and demanded the customs house be turned over to american negotiators, who used proceeds to pay foreign creditors. The case exemplifies the power that the U.S. were able to exert in the Americas as a result of the Roosevelt Corollary, with them taking action to prevent European powers becoming involved in debt collection via their usual methods, such as blockades.

In 1906, Castro punished the international firms involved in the Revolution to the point that diplomatic relations were broken with France due to debt differences.

A modified version of Drago Doctrine, known as the Porter Convention after Horace Porter, was adopted at The Hague in 1907 and added that arbitration and litigation should always be used first.

On 24 June 1908, the government of Theodore Roosevelt decided to recall its diplomatic personnel in Caracas, and relations between the United States and Venezuela were officially severed.

The government of Cipriano Castro, ordered the mandatory requisition of Dutch-flagged vessels in June 1908. It subsequently applied tariff measures and expelled the Dutch ambassador. By 1 July 1908, the rest of Dutch diplomats had to leave Venezuela. The Dutch government, led by Prime Minister Theo Heemskerk, issued an ultimatum to Cipriano Castro, demanding that he withdraw the measures by 1 November. Dutch diplomats gauged the United States' reaction should the Netherlands decide to take military action. Under Roosevelt Corolary the United States expressed no objection as long as the Netherlands did not proceed to occupy Venezuelan territory. Cipriano Castro refused to accept the ultimatum, and the Dutch Navy were mobilized in response. Beginning on 26 November 1908, three Dutch warships began patrolling the Venezuelan coast: Jacob van Heemskerck, Gelderland, and Friesland, with orders to intercept any ship flying the Venezuelan flag.

On 19 December 1908, Vice President Juan Vicente Gómez staged a bloodless coup d'état in the absence of President Castro, who had traveled to Europe for health reasons. The general Gómez reversed Castro's measures on 21 December, and two days later the Netherlands withdrew its warships from the Venezuelan coast.

On 27 December 1908, three US Navy warships anchored in the port of La Guaira. They were the warships USS Maine, USS North Carolina, and USS Dolphin carrying William I. Buchanan, special envoy of Secretary of State Elihu Root. This was how they persuaded the former president Cipriano Castro, who was recovering well in a Berlin hospital after undergoing a nephrectomy, to return.

The general Gómez ruled Venezuela until his death in 1935, directly or indirectly, gradually transforming it into a dictatorship.

== See also ==
- Anglo-German naval arms race
- Baltimore crisis
- Dutch–Venezuelan crisis of 1908
