= 1892 Birthday Honours =

National awards given by Queen Victoria

The 1892 Birthday Honours were appointments by Queen Victoria to various orders and honours to reward and highlight good works by citizens of the British Empire. The appointments were made to celebrate the official birthday of The Queen, and were published in the London Gazette on 24 May 1892 and in The Times on 25 May 1892.

The recipients of honours are displayed here as they were styled before their new honour, and arranged by honour, with classes (Knight, Knight Grand Cross, etc.) and then divisions (Military, Civil, etc.) as appropriate.

== United Kingdom and British Empire ==
=== Baron ===
- The Right Hon. Sir Henry Selwin-Ibbetson Bt MP
- Sir Evelyn Baring GCMG KCB Her Majesty's Agent and Consul-General at Cairo.

=== Privy Councillor ===
The Queen appointed the following to Her Majesty's Most Honourable Privy Council:

- Alexander Bruce, Lord Balfour of Burleigh.

=== Baronetcies ===
- Francis Sharp Powell MP
- Henry Wiggin MP

=== Knight Bachelor ===
- Frederick Bateman
- William James Bell
- William James Richmond Cotton, City Remembrancer.
- John Gardner Engleheart CB Clerk of the Council of the Duchy of Lancaster.
- George Findlay, General Manager of the London and North Western Railway.
- George Johnson FRS Physician Extraordinary to her Majesty.
- Robert Micks, Secretary of the Excise Department, Inland Revenue Board.
- Joseph Palmer Abbott, Speaker of the Legislative Assembly of New South Wales.
- Alexandre Lacoste, Chief Justice of the Queen's Bench, Quebec.
- George Clarke Pill, President of the Legislative Council of the Island of Barbados.

=== The Most Honourable Order of the Bath ===
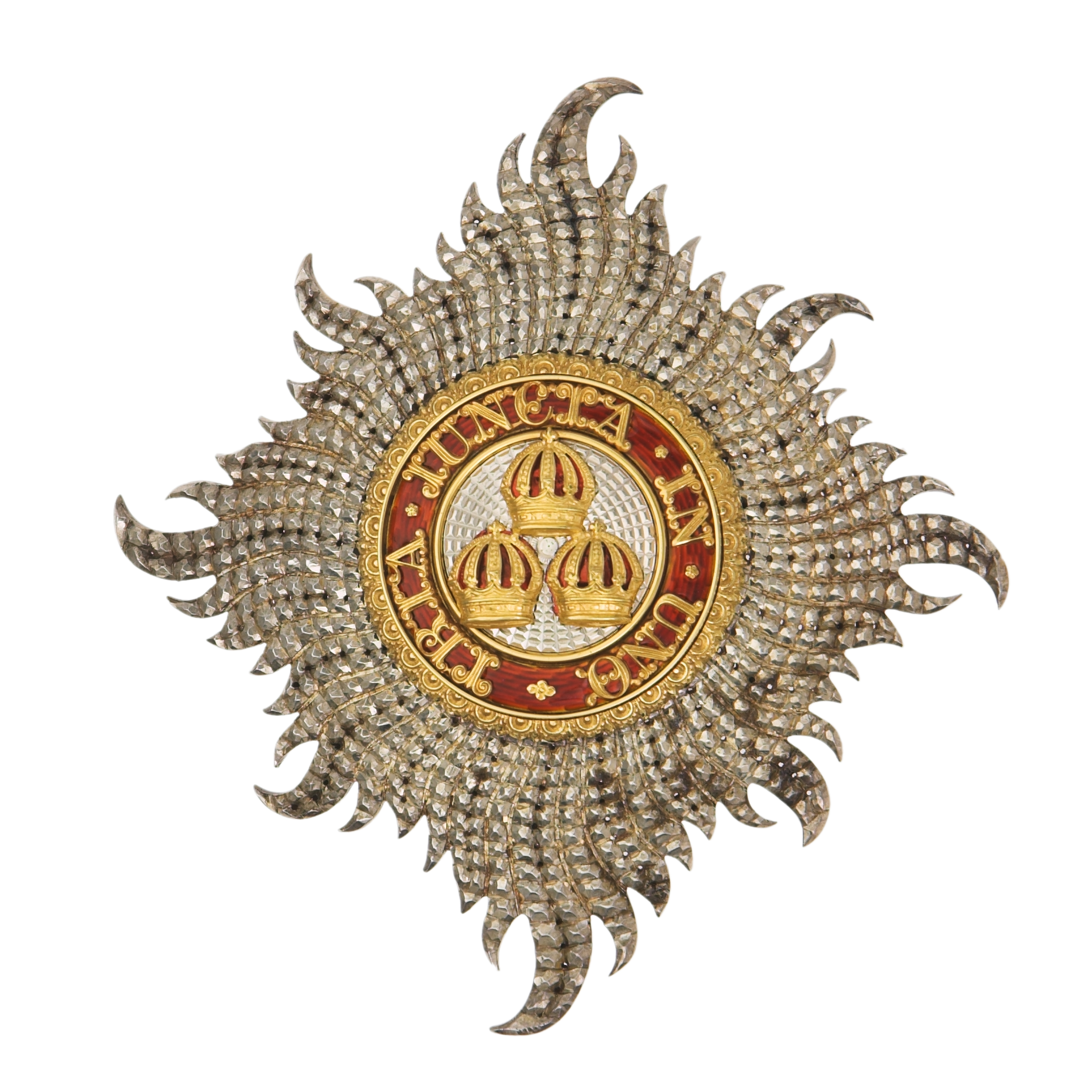
Civilian star of the Knight Grand Cross of the Order of the Bath

==== Knight Grand Cross of the Order of the Bath (KGCB) ====
Military Division

- Admiral Sir George Ommanney Willes KCB

Civil Division

- Sir Julian Pauncefote GCMG KCB Her Majesty's Envoy Extraordinary and Minister Plenipotentiary to the United States.

==== Knight Commander of the Order of the Bath (KCB) ====
Military Division

- Vice-Admiral John Ommanney Hopkins.
- Vice-Admiral Algernon Charles Fieschi Heneage.
- General John William Collman Williams, Royal Marine Artillery.

Civil Division

- Godfrey Lushington CB Under Secretary of State, Home Office.
- Lieutenant-General Richard Hieram Sankey CB (Military Division), Chairman Board of Public Works, Ireland.
- Henry Jenkyns CB Parliamentary Counsel.
- Courtenay Boyle CB Assistant Secretary, Board of Trade (Railway Department).
- Lieutenant-Colonel George Archibald Leach CB late Royal Engineers, late Secretary to the Board of Agriculture.
- Admiral William Windham Hornby, Commissioner, Prison Department, Home Office.
- John Evans DCL President of the Society of Antiquaries.

==== Companion of the Order of the Bath (CB) ====
Military Division

- Capt. Uvedale Corbet Singleton RN
- Capt. Rodney Maclaine Lloyd RN
- Capt. Tynte Ford Hammill RN
- Capt. Sir William Cecil Henry Domville Bt RN
- Capt. Reginald Friend Hannam Henderson RN
- Capt. Henry John May RN
- Commander Robert Archibald James Montgomerie RN
- Colonel Arthur French ADC Royal Marine Artillery.
- Lieutenant-Colonel William Guise Tucker, Royal Marine Artillery.
- Fleet Surgeon Edward Elphinstone Mahon RN
- William Castle RN Chief Inspector of Machinery

Civil Division

- James Caulfeild, Viscount Charlemont, late Comptroller of the Household to the Viceroy of Ireland.
- George Culley, Commissioner of Her Majesty's Woods and Forests.
- Joseph Brown QC Chairman of the Incorporated Council of Law Reporting.
- William Patrick O'Brien, General Prisons Board, Ireland.
- Henry Nicol, late Superintendent, Treasury County Court Department.
- Charles S. Murdoch, Home Office.
- William Clayton Pickersgill, Her Majesty's Vice-Consul in Madagascar.
- Louis Brennan, Superintendent of the Brennan Torpedo Factory.

=== The Most Exalted Order of the Star of India ===
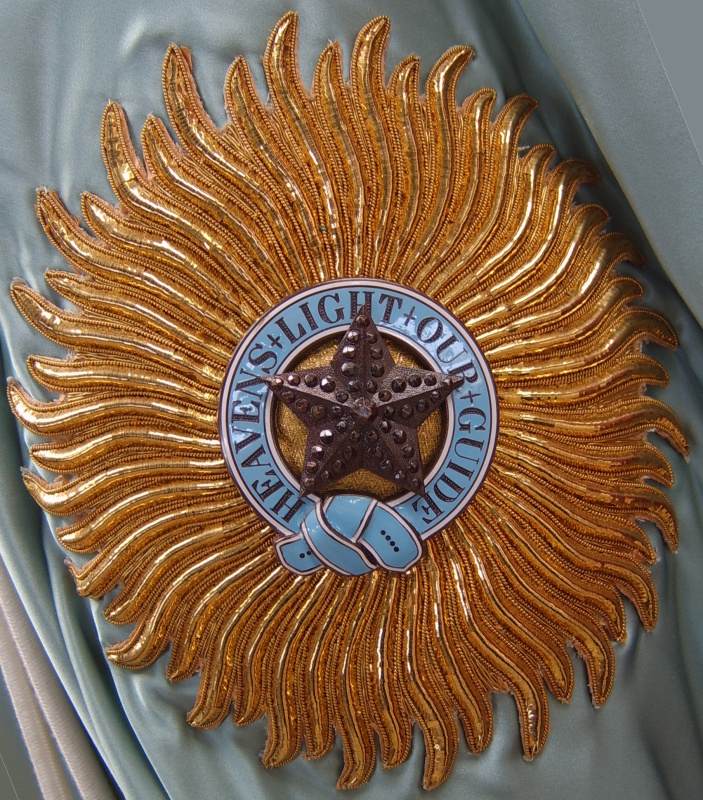
Star of a Knight Grand Commander of the Most Exalted Order of the Star of India.

==== Knight Grand Commander (GCSI) ====
- Colonel His Highness Maharaja Pratap Singh, Indar Mahindar Bahadur, Sipar-i-Sultanat of Jammu and Kashmir.

==== Knight Commander (KCSI) ====
- Sir Auckland Colvin KCMG CIE Bengal Civil Service, Lieutenant Governor of the North-Western Provinces and Chief Commissioner of Oudh.
- Henry Edward Stokes CSI Madras Civil Service, Member of the Council of the Governor of Madras.
- His Excellency Maharaja Bir Shumsher Jang Bahadur Rana, Prime Minister of Nepal.
- Maharaja Mana Vikrama Bahadur Zamorin of Calicut.

==== Companion (CSI) ====
- Sir Edward Charles Buck, Bengal Civil Service, Secretary to Government of India, Revenue and Agriculture Department.
- Henry John Stedman Cotton, Bengal Civil Service, Officiating Secretary to the Government of Bengal, Member of the Legislative Council of Bengal.
- Surgeon-Major-General William Roche Rice Indian Medical Service, Surgeon-General and Sanitary Commissioner with Government of India.
- Colonel Frederick Jervis Home, Royal Engineers, Inspector-General of Irrigation and Deputy Secretary to the Government of India, Public Works Department.
- Major Henry St. Patrick Maxwell, Indian Staff Corps, Deputy Commissioner, Assam, and Political Agent and Superintendent of the Manipur State.
- Surgeon-Major George Scott Robertson, Bengal Establishment, Agency Surgeon, Gilgit.

=== The Most Distinguished Order of Saint Michael and Saint George ===
Star of the Order of Saint Michael and Saint George.

==== Knight Grand Cross of the Order of St Michael and St George (GCMG) ====
- Major-General Sir Francis Wallace Grenfell KCB for services rendered in Egypt.
- Sir Horace Rumbold Bt KCMG Her Majesty's Envoy Extraordinary and Minister Plenipotentiary at the Hague.

==== Knight Commander of the Order of St Michael and St George (KCMG) ====
- John Joseph Caldwell Abbott DCL QC Prime Minister of the Dominion of Canada and President of the Queen's Privy Council for the Dominion.
- Chaloner Alabaster, Her Majesty's Consul-General at Canton.
- Patrick Alphonsus Buckley, Attorney-General and Colonial Secretary of the Colony of New Zealand.
- Ferdinando Vincenzo Inglott CMG late Postmaster-General of the Island of Malta.
- Oliver Mowat QC Attorney-General and Premier of the Province of Ontario in the Dominion of Canada.
- Sir William Montagu Manning Kt Member of the Legislative Council of the Colony of New South Wales.
- Elwin Mitford Palmer CMG for services rendered in Egypt.
- Sir David Tennant Kt Speaker of the House of Assembly of the Colony of the Cape of Good Hope.

==== Companion of the Order of St Michael and St George (CMG) ====
- Alfred Edmund Bateman, of the Board of Trade, for services in connection with British Commercial interests abroad.
- Lewis Adolphus Bernays, Clerk of the Legislative Assembly of the Colony of Queensland.
- George Mercer Dawson Assistant Director and Geologist of the Geological and Natural History Survey of the Dominion of Canada, one of Her Majesty's Commissioners on the Behring's Sea Fishery.
- Robert William Span Mitchell, Government Emigration Agent in Calcutta for the Colonies of British Guiana and Natal.
- Morice Pasha, for services rendered in Egypt.
- Joseph Henry Phillips, Senior Unofficial Member of the Executive Council of the Colony of British Honduras.
- Thomas Shelford, an Unofficial Member of the Legislative Council of the Straits Settlements.
- Walter Ernest Mortimer Stanford, Chief Magistrate of Griqualand East, in the Colony of the Cape of Good Hope.
- James Alexander Swettenham, Auditor-General and Member of the Executive and Legislative Councils of the Island of Ceylon.
- Everard Ferdinand im Thurn Government Agent of the North-Western District of the Colony of British Guiana.
- Francis Pratt Winter, Chief Judicial Officer and Member of the Executive and Legislative Councils of the Possession of British New Guinea.

=== The Most Eminent Order of the Indian Empire ===
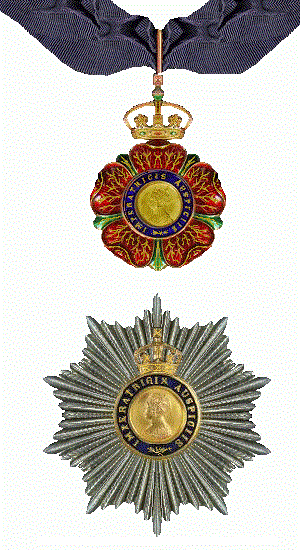
Riband, badge and star of the Knight Grand Commander of the Order of the Indian Empire

==== Knight Grand Commander (GCIE) ====
- Sir James Broadwood Lyall KCSI Bengal Civil Service, late Lieutenant-Governor of the Punjab.
- Maharaja Mirza Sir Pusapati Ananda Gajapati Raju KCIE Mani Sultan Bahadur Garu Zamindar of Vizianagram

==== Knight Commander (KCIE) ====
- Thiruvarur Muthuswamy Iyer CIE one of the Puisne Judges, High Court of Judicature, Madras.
- Griffith Humphrey Pugh Evans, Additional Member of the Council of the Viceroy of India for making Laws and Regulations.
- Edward Charles Kayll Ollivant CIE Bombay Civil Service, Political Agent and Collector of Stamp Revenue, Kathiawar.
- Charles Pontifex, late Legal Adviser and Solicitor to the Secretary of State for India.
- Henry Hoyle Howorth MP
- Henry Seymour King

==== Companion (CIE) ====
- Lieutenant-Colonel John Walter Ottley, Royal Engineers, Chief Engineer and Joint Secretary to the Government of the Punjab.
- Frederick Ewart Robertson, Chief Engineer of the East India Railway.
- Romesh Chunder Dutt, Bengal Civil Service.
- Arthur John Hughes, Superintending Engineer, North Western Provinces and Oudh.
- William John Bird Clerke, Civil Engineer
- Loudoun Francis MacLean, Civil Engineer
- Lieutenant Hugh Daly, Indian Staff Corps, Superintendent, Northern Shan States.
- James George Scott, Officiating Superintendent of the Northern Shan States.
- George Pringle Rose, Officiating Deputy Manager, North Western Railway.
- Raj Bahadur Jai Prakash Lal, Diwan of the Maharaja of Dumraon.
- Raj Bahadur Kadir Dad Khan, Gul Khan, Deputy Collector, Sind.
- Diwan Ganpat Rai, Extra Assistant-Commissioner, Baluchistan.
- William Turner Thiselton-Dyer CMG Director of the Royal Botanic Gardens, Kew.
