= Joe Brown =

Joe Brown may refer to:

== Arts and entertainment ==
- Joe Brown (actor) (1884–1965), American actor
- Joe Brown (judge) (born 1947), television judge and former Tennessee state criminal court judge
- Joe Brown (musician) (born 1941), English musician
- Joe David Brown (1915–1976), American novelist
- Joe E. Brown (1891–1973), American actor and comedian

== Sports ==
=== Baseball ===
- Joe Brown (pitcher) (1900–1950), American Major League baseball player
- Joe Brown (third baseman) (1902–1979), American minor league baseball player
- Joe Brown (utility player) (1859–1888), 19th century baseball player
- Joe L. Brown (1918–2010), Major League Baseball front office executive

=== Football ===
- Joe Brown (footballer, born 1920) (1920–2004), English footballer
- Joe Brown (footballer, born 1929) (1929–2014), English footballer and manager
- Joe Brown (footballer, born 1988), English footballer

=== Other sports ===
- Joe Brown (climber) (1930–2020), English mountaineer
- Joe Brown (boxer) (1926–1997), American boxer
- Joe Brown (rugby league) (born 1999), English rugby league footballer for Bradford Bulls
- Joe Brown (sculptor) (1909–1985), American boxer, coach (Princeton University), sculptor and sculpture instructor
- Joe Brown (American football) (born 1977), American football defensive tackle

== Other people ==
- Joe Ellis Brown (1933–2018), member of the South Carolina House of Representatives, 1986–2006
- Joseph E. Brown (1821–1894), governor of the U.S. state of Georgia, 1853–1865
- Joe Brown (impresario) (1907–1986), New Zealand businessman and entertainment promoter

== See also ==
- Joe Browne (born 1947), American football executive
- Joseph Brown (disambiguation)
