= Joseph Browne =

Joseph Browne may refer to:

- Joseph Browne (civil servant) (born 1948), Fijian civil servant
- Joseph Browne (politician) (1876–1946), Australian politician and judge
- Joseph Browne (provost) (1700–1767), English clergyman and academic, Provost of The Queen's College, Oxford
- Joseph Browne (physician) (fl. 1706), English physician, charlatan and hack writer
- Joe Browne (born 1947), executive of the National Football League
- Joey Browne or Ian Browne (1931–2023), Australian former track cyclist

== See also ==
- Joseph Brown (disambiguation)
- William Joseph Browne (1897–1989), Canadian politician
