= Drago Doctrine =

1902 Argentine policy on debt repayment

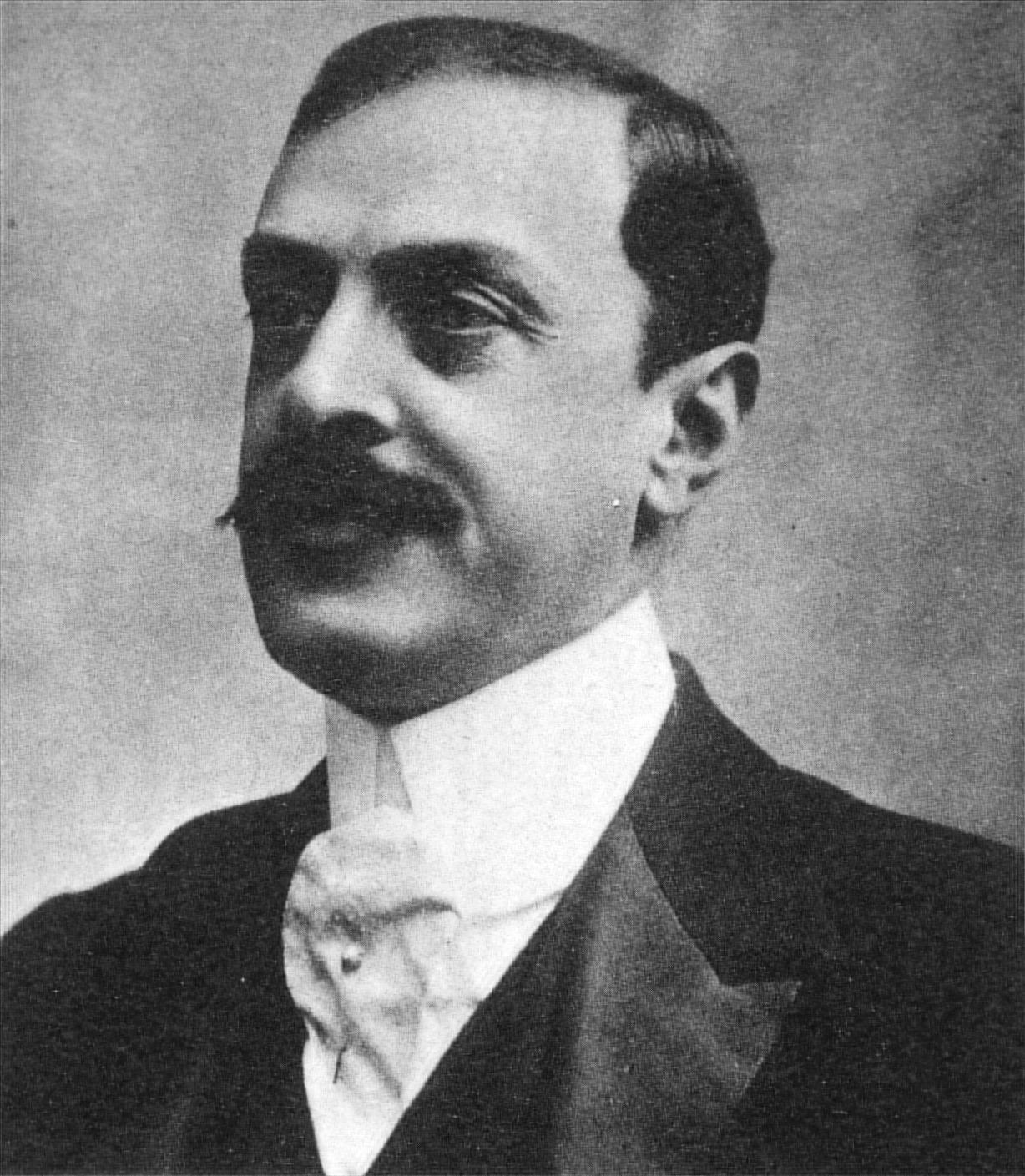
Luis María Drago

The Drago Doctrine was announced in 1902 by Argentine Minister of Foreign Affairs Luis María Drago in a diplomatic note to the United States. This doctrine stated that simply failing to repay national debt was not a valid reason for foreign intervention, especially by a power outside of the Western Hemisphere. The doctrine was a response to the European powers' blockade of Venezuela, which occurred after the country defaulted on its debt. Washington accepted and used the Drago doctrine. In order to prevent further interventions, the United States took control of the customs of several Latin American countries to ensure debt payments were made to Europe.

Drago was responding to a tension between the Monroe Doctrine keeping Europe out and the European demand for repayments of debts. It assumed the principle of sovereign equality that the United States had long supported. It explicitly stated that no foreign power, including the United States, could use force against a nation in the Western Hemisphere to collect government debts.

In 1904, the Roosevelt Corollary was issued by the United States in response to the Drago Doctrine and asserted the right of the United States to intervene in Latin America in the interests of American business and Latin American independence from European powers.

A modified version, known as the Porter Convention after Horace Porter, was adopted at The Hague in 1907 and added that arbitration and litigation should always be used first.

== History ==
It grew from the ideas expressed by Carlos Calvo in Derecho internacional teórico y práctico de Europa y América, commonly known as the Calvo Doctrine. The Calvo Doctrine proposed to prohibit diplomatic intervention before local resources were exhausted.

The Drago Doctrine itself was a response to the actions of Britain, Germany, and Italy, which, in 1902, had blockaded Venezuela in response to Venezuelan government's refusal to pay its massive foreign debt that had been acquired under previous administrations before President Cipriano Castro took power. Secretary of State John Hay was taken aback by the reference to the Monroe Doctrine and delayed six weeks before responding by quoting Theodore Roosevelt's 1901 annual message to Congress: "We do not guarantee any state against punishment if it misconducts itself."

Roosevelt himself, although he would lavish praise on Drago's doctrine in later years, had earlier written in his capacity as Vice President to the German diplomat Hermann Speck von Sternburg that "if any South American State misbehaves towards any European country, let the European country spank it."

The Drago Doctrine was used by Venezuela as a rationale for its vote in support of Argentina at the Organization of American States meeting on the Argentine debt crisis that involved NML Capital.

== See also ==
- Calvo doctrine
