= Calvo Doctrine =

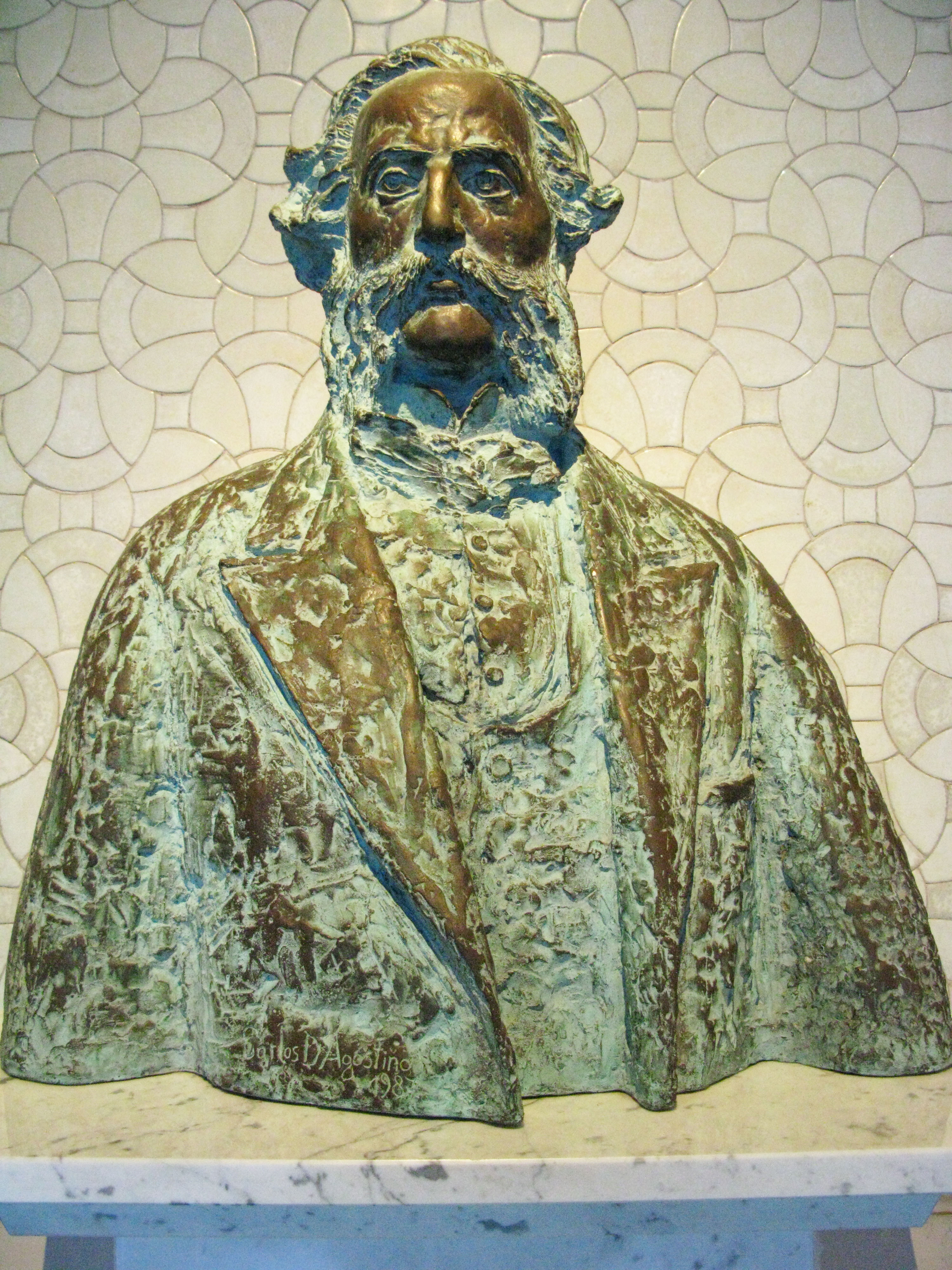
Carlos Calvo (1824-1906)

The Calvo Doctrine is a foreign policy doctrine which holds that jurisdiction in international investment disputes lies with the country in which the investment is located. The Calvo Doctrine stood in contrast to historical rules governing foreign investment which held that foreign investors could appeal expropriation decision by a foreign government in their home country. The Calvo Doctrine thus proposed to prohibit diplomatic protection or (armed) intervention before local resources were exhausted. An investor, under this doctrine, has no recourse but to use the local courts, rather than those of their home country. As a policy prescription, the Calvo Doctrine is an expression of legal nationalism. The principle, named after Carlos Calvo, an Argentine jurist, has been applied throughout Latin America and other areas of the world.

The doctrine arose from Calvo's ideas, expressed in his Derecho internacional teórico y práctico de Europa y América (Paris, 1868; greatly expanded in subsequent editions, which were published in French). Calvo justified his doctrine as necessary to prevent the abuse of the jurisdiction of weak nations by more powerful nations. It has since been incorporated as a part of several Latin American constitutions, as well as many other treaties, statutes, and contracts. The doctrine is used chiefly in concession contracts, the clause attempting to give local courts final jurisdiction and to obviate any appeal to diplomatic intervention.

The Drago Doctrine is a narrower application of Calvo's wider principle.

== See also ==
- Drago doctrine
- Diplomatic protection
- International Centre for Settlement of Investment Disputes
