= Joseph Brown (cricketer) =

English cricketer

Joseph Henry Brown (26 January 1872 – 27 April 1915) was an English cricketer active from 1898 to 1905 who played for Leicestershire. He was born and died in Earl Shilton. He appeared in fifteen first-class matches as a righthanded batsman who bowled off breaks. He scored 305 runs with a highest score of 53 not out and took seven wickets with a best performance of two for 6.
