= Joseph Brown (barrister) =

English barrister

Joseph Brown CB KC
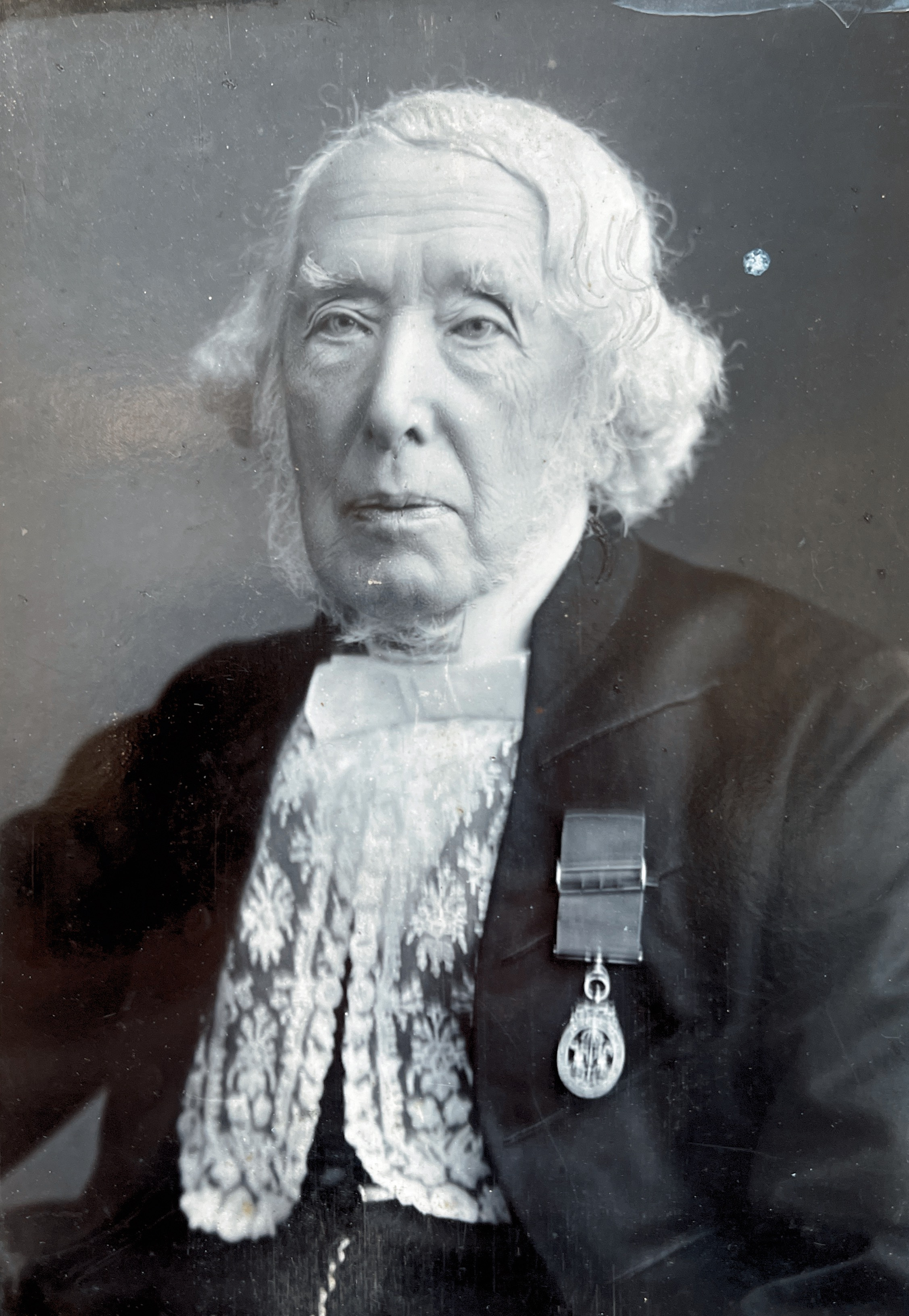
- Portrait of Joseph Brown, wearing his CB medal, 1890s
- Born: 4 April 1809; Walworth, Newington
- Died: 9 June 1902 (aged 93); London
- Other names: Joe Brown., Joey Brown
- Occupation: Barrister
- Spouse: Mary Smith
- Children: Marianne Brown; Helen Brown; Harold Brown; Reginald Brown KC; Oswald Brown
- Parents: Joseph Brown; Charlotte Turner

Joseph Brown CB KC (4 April 1809 – 9 June 1902) was an English barrister and bencher of Middle Temple. He held the positions of both Lent Reader (1869) and Treasurer (1878) of the Temple, and also served as the Chairman of the Incorporated Council of Law Reporting. At his death at the age of 93, he was the oldest living King's Counsel, and the third-longest serving.

== Biography ==
=== Early life ===
Joseph Brown was born in Walworth, the son of a wine merchant - also named Joseph - who was the cousin of Timothy Brown. He was educated at a grammar school in Camberwell, and thereafter at a private school in Wimbledon. At the age of eighteen, he began his career with Armstrong & Co., a firm of West India merchants.

=== Legal career ===
In 1829, he began to study law under Peter Turner, a London solicitor. Brown was admitted to the Middle Temple in January 1832. He initially studied as a special pleader under William Watson, and then Sir John Bayley; becoming a pleader under the bar in 1834. He was called to the bar on 7 November 1845 and became a Queen's Counsel in 1865. That same year, he was instrumental in the preparation and publication of the Law Reports. He represented Middle Temple on the Incorporated Council of Law Reporting, eventually chairing the council from 1875 to 1892. In 1878, he held to position of Treasurer of the Middle Temple. As part of his role, in December of that year he proposed an address to be sent to Queen Victoria on the death of her daughter, Princess Alice. In 1880, he gave evidence to a Committee of the House of Commons on the bill which would eventually become the Employers' Liability Act 1880. On his retirement, he was created a CB in the 1892 Birthday Honours.

==== Notable Cases Argued ====
- 1858: Trial of the Royal British Bank Directors
- 1869: Great Western Railway Co. v. Sutton
- 1870: R. v. Southampton Port Commissioners
- 1870: Schibsby v Westenholz

=== Marriage and children ===
Brown married Mary Smith (1808–1891), of Winchcombe on 24 August 1840. They had three sons and two daughters together:

- Marianne Brown (1841–1922), married Joseph Addison, partner in Linklater & Co. and president of the Law Society.
- Helen Brown (1843–1917)
- Harold Brown (1844–1910), partner in Linklater & Co.
- Reginald Brown KC (1846–1936), barrister of Middle Temple, JP of Cheshire, and County Court Judge.
- Oswald Brown (1848–1906), hydraulic engineer, practiced in Germany, Australia, France and the UK

=== Death ===
Joseph died at his residence in Regent's Park, London, on 9 June 1902.

== Published works ==
- 1859: The Dark Side of Trial by Jury
- 1865: The Evils of Unlimited Liability for Accidents of Masters and Railway Companies, especially since Lord Campbell's Act
- 1874: The Tichborne case: compared with previous impostures of the same kind
- 1877: Eastern Christianity and the War: The Idolatry, Superstition and Corruption of the Christians of Turkey, Greece, and, Russia

== Recognition ==
- Queen's Counsel (QC), 17 February 1865
- Companion of the Most Honourable Order of the Bath (CB), 25 May 1892

== Arms ==
Coat of arms of Joseph Brown CB KC
Escutcheon Azure, on a chevron wavy Or between three fleurs-de-lys Argent a thistle's head proper.
