= Alfred Bateman =

British statistician

Bateman in 1917.

Sir Alfred Edmund Bateman KCMG (31 August 1844 – 7 August 1929) was a British Statistician, sometime president of the Royal Statistical Society.
