= Carlos Calvo (historian) =

Argentine publicist and historian

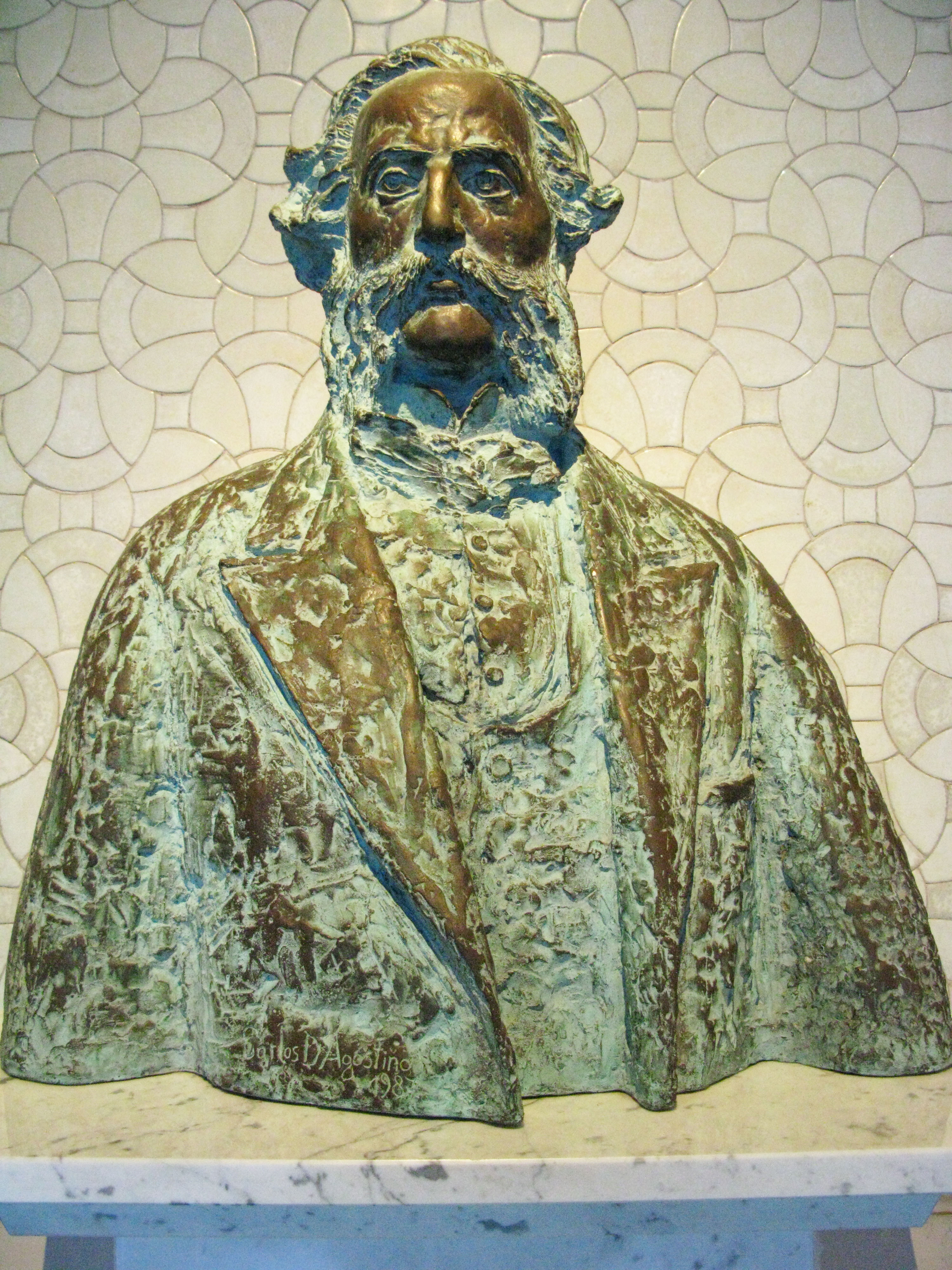
Carlos Calvo

Carlos Calvo (February 26, 1824, Buenos Aires – May 2, 1906, Paris) was an Argentine publicist and diplomat who made influential contributions to international law. He is most well known for the Calvo Doctrine in international law, which holds that jurisdiction in international investment disputes lies with the country in which the investment is located.

In 1860 he was sent by the Paraguayan government on a special mission to London and Paris. Remaining in France, he published in 1863 his Derecho internacional teórico y práctico de Europa y America, in two volumes, and at the same time brought out a French version. The book contained the essence of what has come to be known as the Calvo Doctrine. The book immediately took rank as one of the highest modern authorities on the subject, and by 1887 the first French edition had become enlarged to six volumes.

In 1869, Calvo published an article arguing that states undergoing civil war were not responsible for harm caused to aliens as a result of riot or civil war. According to Kathryn Greenman, Calvo's article influenced later international legal debates about state responsibility for rebel actions.

Calvo's work influenced diplomats from Latin America to codify international law to prohibit military interventions by creditors to collect debt.

Between 1862 and 1869 he published in Spanish and French his great collection in fifteen volumes of the treaties and other diplomatic acts of the South American republics, and between 1864 and 1875 his Annales historiques de la révolution de l'Amérique latine, in five volumes. In 1884 he was one of the founders at the Ghent congress of the Institut de Droit International. In the following year he was Argentine minister at Berlin, and published his Dictionnaire du droit international publique et privat in that city.
