= Luis María Drago =

Argentine politician (1859–1921)

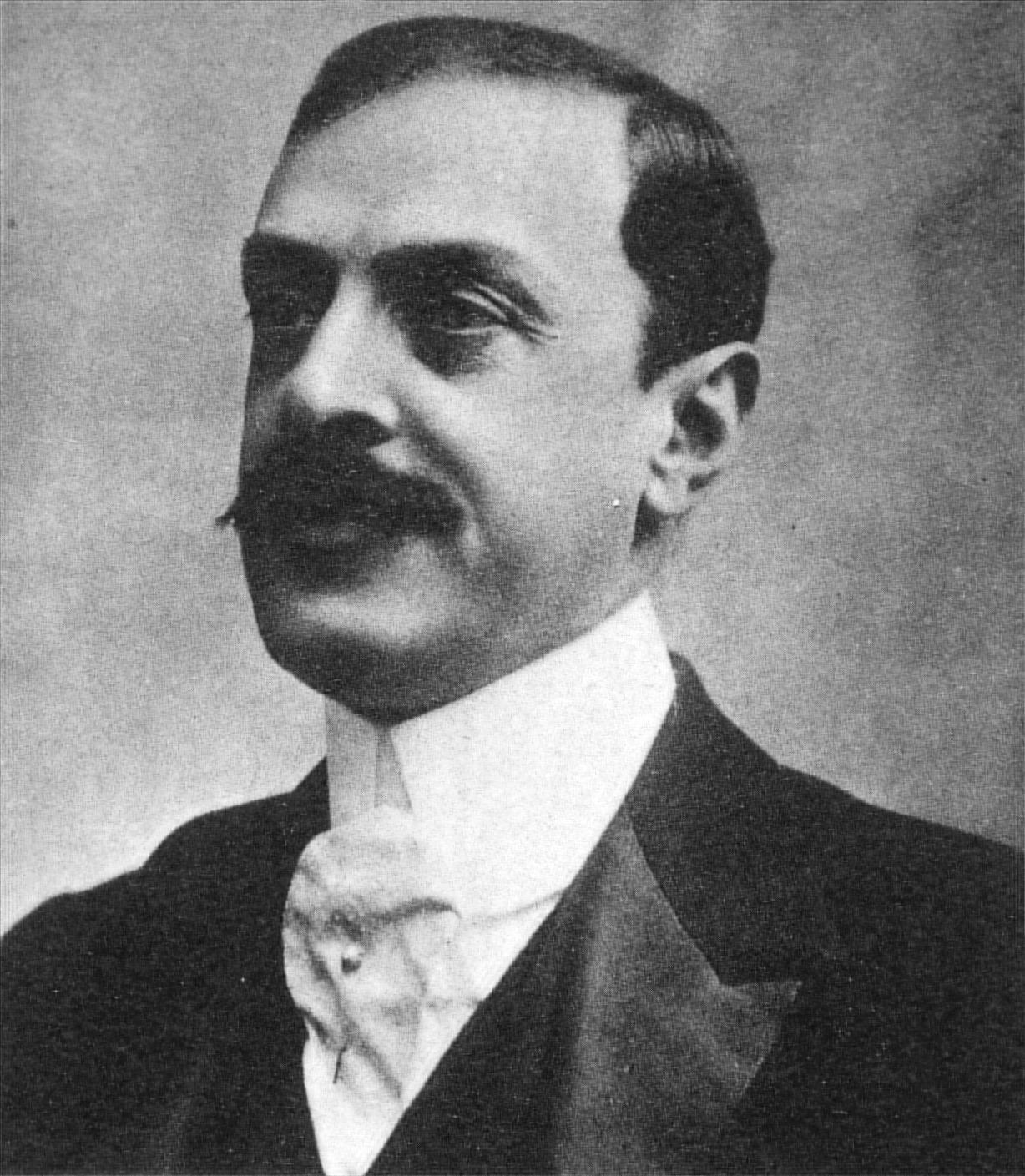

Minister of Foreign Affairs
- In office 11 August 1902 – 18 July 1903
- President: Julio Argentino Roca
- Preceded by: Joaquín V. González
- Succeeded by: Joaquín V. González

Personal details
- Born: 6 May 1859 Mercedes, Buenos Aires, Argentina
- Died: 9 June 1921 (aged 62) Buenos Aires, Argentina

Luis María Drago (May 6, 1859 - June 9, 1921) was an Argentine politician.

Born into a distinguished Argentine family in Buenos Aires, Drago began his career as a newspaper editor. Later, he served as a minister of foreign affairs (1902). At that time, when the UK, Germany, and Italy were seeking to collect the public debt of Venezuela by force, he wrote to the Argentine minister in Washington setting forth his doctrine, commonly known as the Drago Doctrine.
