= Joseph Ebert Brown =

Baptist minister and state legislator

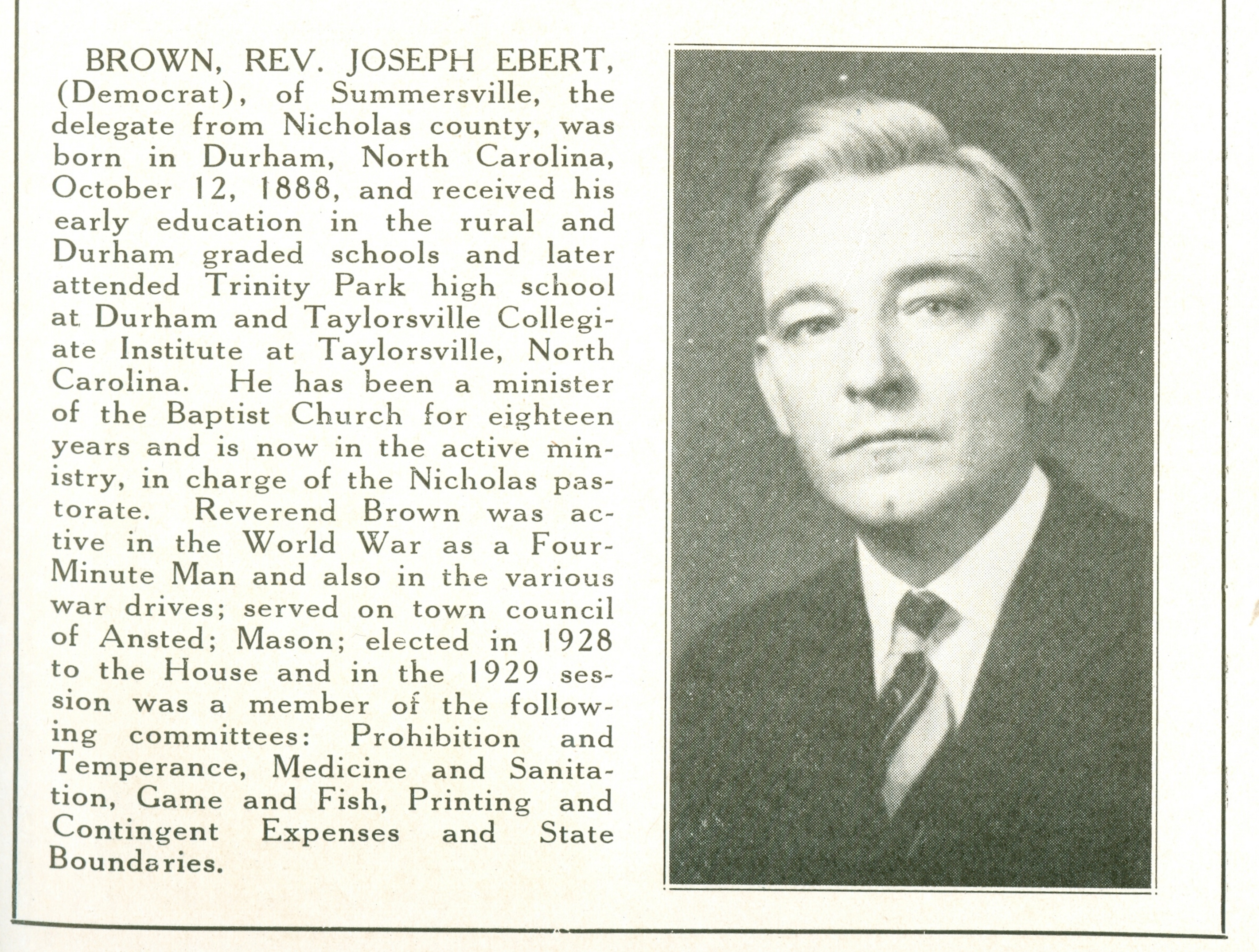

Joseph Ebert Brown (October 12, 1888 – April 4, 1973), also known as Joseph Egbert Brown, was a Baptist minister and state legislator in West Virginia. He was born in Durham, North Carolina.

A Democrat, he lived in Summersville, West Virginia. He represented Nicholas County, West Virginia from 1929 to 1930.
