= Robert Archibald James Montgomerie =

Rear-Admiral Robert Archibald James Montgomerie CB CMG AM
- Born: 11 September 1855
- Died: 1 September 1908 (aged 52)
- Military career
- Allegiance: United Kingdom
- Branch: Royal Navy
- Rank: Rear-admiral
- Commands: HMS Charybdis
- Awards: Companion of the Order of the Bath; Companion of the Order of St Michael and St George; Albert Medal for Lifesaving

Rear-Admiral Robert Archibald James Montgomerie, CB, CMG, AM (11 September 1855 – 1 September 1908) was a British Royal Navy officer, who received the Albert Medal for Lifesaving.

== Naval career ==
Montgomerie joined the Royal Navy, and served on the royal yacht HMY Victoria and Albert when he was promoted to lieutenant on 13 September 1878. He served on the Nile in Egypt 1885-86.

He was promoted to commander on 24 August 1887, and to captain on 1 January 1894, and was appointed a Companion of the Order of the Bath (CB) in the 1892 Birthday Honours list on 25 May 1892. In February 1901 he was appointed senior naval officer for the protection of the Newfoundland Fisheries, with the rank of Commodore, in command of the protected cruiser HMS Charybdis based at St. John's. During his stay in North America he was in charge of a ´Particular Service Squadron´ during the Venezuelan crisis of 1902–03. As he ended his posting in Newfoundland he was appointed a Companion of the Order of St Michael and St George (CMG) in the 1904 Birthday Honours list on 9 November 1904.

Montgomerie was promoted to rear-admiral on 19 June 1905, and appointed in command of the torpedo boat and submarine flotillas in the Royal Naval Reserve.
