= Joe Browne =

American football executive (born 1947)

Joseph Thomas Browne (born March 6, 1947) is an American former National Football League (NFL) executive. At the time of his retirement, he was the longest-tenured employee in NFL history, with a career spanning over 50 years.

After his retirement, Browne was honored twice by the Pro Football Hall of Fame. He received the Ralph Hay Pioneer Award in August 2016. The award is presented by the Hall to a person who has made significant and innovative contributions to professional football. In 2022, Browne also was honored as a member of the charter class for the Hall’s new “Awards of Excellence” program. This award was given in recognition of outstanding contributions to professional football's growth, safety, popularity and its overall success on the field and behind the scenes.

== NFL employment ==
Browne began his NFL work as a 17-year-old college intern in 1965.

After serving on active duty in the United States Marine Corps, he became a full-time NFL employee in 1970 and was named to several key front office posts by then-commissioner Pete Rozelle during the next 20 years.

Browne later was appointed the NFL's first-ever vice president by then-commissioner Paul Tagliabue in April 1990. He was promoted to senior vice president in 1995 and executive vice president of communications & government affairs in 2002.

== Awards and boards ==
Browne now heads the New York-based Joe Browne Agency, which serves clients at the intersection of sports, entertainment and politics. He also serves on the international advisory board for FleishmanHillard, the global communications firm.

He serves on the board of directors of the Pat Tillman Foundation and the advisory board for the Pro Football Hall of Fame. He also was a member of the national board of governors for the United Way of America.

Browne was a charter member of the board of directors of USA Football, the governing body for amateur football in the United States. In 2016, the organization created the Joe Browne Leadership Award in his honor. Browne himself was the first recipient.

Browne also has been a recipient of the Pete Rozelle Award given by the New Orleans Touchdown Club and the Reds Bagnell Award presented by the Maxwell Club of Philadelphia.

He was presented with the Flax Trust Award in 2012 for his support of peace in Northern Ireland. He also was named a member of the charter class of the Top 50 Irish Personalities in Pro and College Sports by the Irish Voice in 2013.

== Personal life ==
Browne, the son of an Irish immigrant father (John Browne) and an Irish-American mother (Margaret Reills Browne), was born in New York City. He was the first scholarship basketball player at Archbishop Molloy High School in Queens, where he is a member of his alma mater’s hall of fame. He is a graduate of St. Francis College in Brooklyn.

Browne and his wife Karyn live on Long Island. They have two sons.
