= Foreign policy of Japan =

International relations of the East Asian country

Japan is a great power and a member of numerous international organizations, including the United Nations (since 1956), the OECD, and the Group of Seven. Although it has renounced its right to declare war, the country maintains Self-Defense Forces that rank as one of the world's strongest militaries. After World War II, Japan experienced record growth in an economic miracle, becoming the second-largest economy in the world by 1990. As of 2021, the country's economy is the third-largest by nominal GDP and the fourth-largest by PPP.

Japan has close economic and military relations with the United States, with which it maintains a security alliance. The United States is a major market for Japanese exports and a major source of Japanese imports, and is committed to defending the country, with military bases in Japan.

Japan's relationship with South Korea had historically been strained because of Japan's treatment of during Japanese colonial rule, particularly over the issue of Japan's military using Korean comfort women in World War II. In 2015, Japan agreed to settle the comfort women dispute with South Korea by issuing a formal apology and paying money to the surviving comfort women.

Japan is engaged in several territorial disputes with North Korea, South Korea, Russia, China and Taiwan. Relations with Russia have been strained due to Japan's rejection of Russian control of the Southern Kuril Islands, since 1945.

For current issues see Foreign relations of Japan.

== Policy making by Prime Minister ==
The primary responsibility for the Japanese foreign policy, as determined by the 1947 constitution, is exercised by the cabinet and subject to the overall supervision of the National Diet. The prime minister is required to make periodic reports on foreign relations to the Diet, whose upper and lower houses each have a foreign affairs committee. Each committee reports on its deliberations to plenary sessions of the chamber to which it belongs. Special committees are formed occasionally to consider special . Diet members have the right to raise pertinent policy questions—officially termed interpellations—to the minister of foreign affairs and the prime minister. Treaties with foreign countries require ratification by the Diet. As head of state, the emperor performs the ceremonial function of receiving foreign envoys and attesting to foreign treaties ratified by the Diet. Before 1945 the Emperor had a major voice in setting policy.

Constitutionally since 1945 the dominant figure in the political system, the prime minister has the final word in major foreign policy decisions. The minister of foreign affairs, a senior member of the cabinet, acts as the prime minister's chief adviser in matters of planning and implementation. The minister is assisted by two vice ministers: one in charge of administration, who was at the apex of the Ministry of Foreign Affairs structure as its senior career official, and the other in charge of political liaison with the Diet. Other key positions in the ministry include members of the ministry's Secretariat, which has divisions handling consular, emigration, communications, and cultural exchange functions, and the directors of the various regional and functional bureaus in the ministry.

== Postwar period ==
Throughout the post–World War II period, Japan concentrated on economic growth. It accommodated itself flexibly to the regional and global policies of the United States while avoiding major initiatives of its own; adhered to pacifist principles embodied in the 1947 constitution, referred to as the "peace constitution"; and generally took a passive, low-profile role in world affairs. Relations with other countries were governed by what the leadership called "omnidirectional diplomacy," which was essentially a policy of maintaining political neutrality in foreign affairs while expanding economic relations wherever possible. This policy was highly successful and allowed Japan to prosper and grow as an economic power, but it was feasible only while the country enjoyed the security and economic stability provided by its ally, the United States.

=== Post-occupation Japan ===
The Yoshida Doctrine was a strategy adopted by Japan under Prime Minister Shigeru Yoshida, the prime minister 1948–1954. He concentrated upon reconstructing Japan's domestic economy while relying heavily on the security alliance with the United States. The Yoshida Doctrine emerged in 1951 and it shaped Japanese foreign policy into the 21st century. First, Japan is firmly allied with the United States in the Cold War against Communism. Second, Japan relies on American military strength and limits its own defence forces to a minimum. Third, Japan emphasizes economic diplomacy in its world affairs. The Yoshida doctrine was accepted by the United States; the actual term was coined in 1977. The economic dimension was fostered by Hayato Ikeda who served as finance minister and later as prime minister. Most historians argue the policy was wise and successful, but a minority criticize it as naïve and inappropriate.

When Japan regained its sovereignty in 1952 and reentered the international community as an independent nation, it found itself in a world preoccupied by the Cold War between East and West, in which the Soviet Union and the United States headed opposing camps. By virtue of the Treaty of Peace with Japan signed in San Francisco on September 8, 1951 (effective April 28, 1952), ending the state of war between Japan and most of the Allied powers except the Soviet Union and the People's Republic of China, and the Mutual Security Assistance Pact between Japan and the United States, signed in San Francisco the same day, Japan essentially became a dependent ally of the United States, which continued to maintain bases and troops on Japanese soil.

Japan's foreign policy goals during most of the early postwar period were essentially to regain economic viability and establish its credibility as a peaceful member of the world community. National security was entrusted to the protective shield and nuclear umbrella of the United States, which was permitted under the security pact that came into effect in April 1952 to deploy its forces in and about Japan. The pact provided a framework governing the use of United States forces against military threats—internal or external—in the region. A special diplomatic task was to assuage the suspicions and alleviate the resentments of Asian neighbors who had suffered from Japanese colonial rule and imperialist aggression in the past. Japan's diplomacy toward its Asian neighbors, therefore, tended to be extremely low-key, conciliatory, and nonassertive. With respect to the world at large, the nation avoided political issues and concentrated on economic goals. Under its unidirectional diplomacy, it sought to cultivate friendly ties with all nations, proclaimed a policy of "separation of politics and economics," and adhered to a neutral position on some east–west issues.

During the 1950s and 1960s, foreign policy actions were guided by three basic principles: close cooperation with the United States for both security and economic reasons; promotion of a free-trade system congenial to Japan's own economic needs; and international cooperation through the United Nations (UN)—to which it was admitted in 1956—and other multilateral bodies. Adherence to these principles worked well and contributed to phenomenal economic recovery and growth during the first two decades after the end of the occupation.

=== 1970s ===
In the 1970s, the basic postwar principles remained unchanged but were approached from a new perspective, owing to the pressure of practical politics at home and abroad. There was growing domestic pressure on the government to exercise more foreign policy initiatives independent of the United States, without, however, compromising vital security and economic ties. The so-called Nixon "shock," involving the surprise visit to China by Richard Nixon and the sudden reconciliation in Sino-American relations, also argued for a more independent Japanese foreign policy. A similar move in Sino-Japanese relations followed.

The nation's phenomenal economic growth had made it a ranking world economic power by the early 1970s and had generated a sense of pride and self-esteem, especially among the younger generation. The demand for a more independent foreign policy reflected this enhanced self-image. On the other hand, Japan's burgeoning economic growth and expansion into overseas markets had given rise to foreign charges of "economic aggression" and demands that it adopt more balanced trade policies. Changes in the power relationships in the Asia-Pacific quadrilateral—made up of Japan, the People's Republic of China, the United States, and the Soviet Union—also called for reexamination of policies. The deepening Sino-Soviet split and confrontation, the dramatic rapprochement between the United States and China, the rapid reduction of the United States military presence in Asia following the Vietnam War (Second Indochina War, 1954–75), and the 1970s expansion of Soviet military power in the western Pacific all required a reevaluation of Japan's security position and overall role in Asia.

The move toward a more autonomous foreign policy was accelerated in the 1970s by the United States decision to withdraw troops from Indochina. Japanese public opinion had earlier favored some distance between Japan and the United States involvement in war in Vietnam. The collapse of the war effort in Vietnam was seen as the end of United States military and economic dominance in Asia and brought to the fore a marked shift in Japan's attitudes about the United States. This shift, which had been developing since the early 1970s, took the form of questioning the credibility of the United States nuclear umbrella, as well as its ability to underwrite a stable international currency system, guarantee Japan's access to energy and raw materials, and secure Japan's interests in a stable political order. The shift therefore required a reassessment of omnidirectional diplomacy.

Changes in world economic relations during the 1970s also encouraged a more independent stance. Japan had become less dependent on the Western powers for resources. Oil, for example, was obtained directly from the producing countries in the Middle East and not from the Western-controlled multinational companies. Other important materials also came increasingly from sources other than the United States and its allies, while trade with the United States as a share of total trade dropped significantly during the decade of the 1970s. But the oil crises of the 1970s sharpened Japanese awareness of the country's vulnerability to cutoffs of raw material and energy supplies, underscoring the need for a less passive, more independent foreign policy. Thus, political leaders began to argue that in the interests of economic self-preservation, more attention should be paid to the financial and development needs of other countries, especially those that provided Japan with vital energy and raw material supplies.

Soon after, in the troublesome year of 1979, Japan's leaders welcomed the reassertion of United States military power in Asian and world affairs following the Islamic revolution in Iran, the Teheran hostage crisis, and the Soviet military invasion of Afghanistan. Japanese leaders played a strong supporting role in curbing economic and other interaction with the Soviet Union and its allies in order to help check the expansion of Soviet power in sensitive areas among the developing world countries.

=== 1980s ===
Japanese thinking on foreign policy was also influenced by the rise of a new postwar generation to leadership and policy-making positions. The differences in outlook between the older leaders still in positions of power and influence and the younger generation that was replacing them complicated formulation of foreign policy. Under Prime Minister Yasuhiro Nakasone, a more hawkish stance on foreign policy was introduced. Japan built up a close political-military relationship with the United States as part of a de facto international front of a number of developed and developing countries intent on checking Soviet expansion. Japan's defense spending continued to grow steadily despite overall budgetary restraint. Japan became increasingly active in granting foreign assistance to countries of strategic importance in east–west competition.

The realignment of United States and Japanese currencies in the mid-1980s increased the growth of Japanese trade, aid, and investment, especially in Asia. It also accelerated the reversal of the United States fiscal position, from one of the world's largest creditors in the early 1980s to the world's largest debtor at the end of the decade. Japan became the world's largest creditor, an increasingly active investor in the United States, and a major contributor to international debt relief, financial institutions, and other assistance efforts. Japan had also become the second largest donor of foreign aid.

=== 1990s ===
By 1990 Japan's foreign policy choices often challenged the leadership's tendency to avoid radical shifts and to rely on incremental adjustments. Although still generally supportive of close ties, including the alliance relationship with the United States, Japanese leaders were well aware of strong American frustrations with Japanese economic practices and Japan's growing economic power relative to the United States in world affairs. Senior United States leaders were calling upon Japanese officials to work with them in crafting "a new conceptual framework" for Japan-United States relations that would take account of altered strategic and economic realities and changes in Japanese and United States views about the bilateral relationship. The results of this effort were far from clear. Some optimistically predicted "a new global partnership" in which the United States and Japan would work together as truly equal partners in dealing with global problems. Pessimists predicted that negative feelings generated by the realignment in United States and Japanese economic power and persistent trade frictions would prompt Japan to strike out more on its own, without the "guidance" of the United States. Given the growing economic dominance of Japan in Asia, Tokyo was seen as most likely to strike out independently there first, translating its economic power into political and perhaps, eventually, military influence.

Still, the image of Japan as a "military dwarf" was in a sense ironic, as Japan had one of the biggest defense budgets in the world throughout the 1980s and 1990s and defense expenditure is one of the most frequently used indicators of military power. It also had very advanced naval and air self-defense capabilities.

The collapse of the Soviet Union and the growing preoccupation of its former republics and the East European nations with internal political and economic problems increased the importance of economic competition, rather than military power, to Japan. These formerly communist countries were anxiously seeking aid, trade, and technical benefits from the developed countries, such as Japan. The power of Japan's ally, the United States, was also seen by many as waning. The United States was forced to look increasingly to Japan and others to shoulder the financial burdens entailed in the transformation of former communist economies in Eastern Europe and other urgent international requirements that fall upon the shoulders of world leaders.

Japanese industries and enterprises were among the most capable in the world. High savings and investment rates and high-quality education solidified the international leadership of these enterprises during the mid- to late 1990s. Its economic power gave Japan a steadily growing role in the World Bank, the International Monetary Fund, and other international financial institutions. Investment and trade flows give Japan by far the dominant economic role in Asia, and Japanese aid and investment were widely sought after in other parts of the world. It appears to be only a matter of time before such economic power would be translated into greater political power. The crucial issue for the United States and many other world governments centers on how Japan will employ this growing economic power.

Inside Japan, both elite and popular opinion expressed growing support for a more prominent international role, proportionate to the nation's economic power, foreign assistance, trade, and investment. But the traditional post–World War II reluctance to take a greater military role in the world remained. A firm consensus continued to support the 1960 Treaty of Mutual Cooperation and Security and other bilateral agreements with the United States as the keystones of Japan's security policy. However, Japanese officials were increasingly active in using their economic and financial resources in seeking a greater voice in international financial and political organizations and in shaping the policies of the developed countries toward international trouble spots, especially in Asia.

== Role of domestic politics ==
General satisfaction in Japan with the peace and prosperity that had been brought to the country made it hard for opposition parties to garner much support for a radical move to the left in Japan's foreign policy. The collapse of communism in Eastern Europe and the widely publicized brutalities of communist regimes in Asia in the late 1980s further dampened popular Japanese interest in shifting foreign policy to the left. Since the 1980s coming to terms with Russia has been a major issue, but public opinion demands the return of the Kuril Islands. Japan's relationship with the United States has been a major issue in domestic politics between left and right since 1951. The Sino-United States rapprochement of the 1970s and the stiffening of Japan-Soviet relations in the 1980s caused the opposition parties to be less insistent on the need to terminate the security treaty. The Democratic Socialist Party and the Kōmeitō indicated their readiness to support the treaty, while the Japan Socialist Party dropped its demand for immediate abrogation. Only the Japan Communist Party remained adamant.

By the 1980s, the ruling LDP modified its base of political power. The social composition of LDP support shifted away from the traditional conservative reliance on business and rural groups to include every category of the electorate. This shift resulted from efforts by LDP politicians to align various local interests in mutually advantageous arrangements in support of LDP candidates. The LDP had brought together various candidates and their supporting interest groups and had reached a policy consensus to pursue economic development while depending strongly on the United States security umbrella.

Domestic political challenges to LDP dominance waxed and waned later in the 1980s as the party faced major influence-peddling scandals with weak and divided leadership, such as the Lockheed bribery scandals and the Recruit scandal. In 1989 the opposition Japan Socialist Party won control of the Diet's House of Councillors. But the Japan Socialist Party's past ideological positions on foreign policy appeared to be more of a liability than an asset going into the House of Representatives elections in 1990, and the party attempted to modify a number of positions that called for pushing foreign policy to the left. In contrast, the LDP standard bearer, Minister Kaifu Toshiki, used identification with the United States and the West to his advantage in the successful LDP effort to sustain control of the House of Representatives in February 1990.

In 1993 the coalition government of Prime Minister Hosokawa Morihiro pledged to continue the LDP policy of economic and security ties with the United States; of responding to domestic and international expectations of greater Japanese political and economic contributions; and of international cooperation through the UN and other international organizations in the cause of world peace, disarmament, aid to developing countries, and educational and technical cooperation. Foreign policy speeches by the prime minister and the minister of foreign affairs were widely disseminated, and pamphlets and booklets on major foreign policy questions were issued frequently. Electoral reform in 1994 created stronger incentives for politicians to campaign on programmatic policies, such as national security issues.

Political groups opposing the government's foreign policy presented their views freely through political parties and the mass media, which took vocal and independent positions on wide-ranging external issues. Some of the opposing elements included were leftists who sought to exert influence through their representatives in the Diet, through mass organizations, and sometimes through rallies and street demonstrations. In contrast, special interest groups supporting the government—including the business community and agricultural interests—brought pressure to bear on the prime minister, cabinet members, and members of the Diet, usually through behind-the-scenes negotiations and compromises.

Partisan political activities of all ideological tendencies were undertaken freely and openly, but the difference in foreign policy perspectives appeared increasingly in the 1980s to derive less from ideology than from more pragmatic considerations. Broadly stated, the partisan disagreement among the various groups competing for power had centered on the question of Japan's safety from external threat or attack. The dominant view was that although the Japanese should be responsible for defending their homeland, they should also continue their security ties with the United States, at least until they could gain sufficient confidence in their own self-defense power, which has been interpreted as not being proscribed by Article 9 of the constitution. Proponents of this view agreed that this self-defense capability should be based on conventional arms and that any nuclear shield should be provided by the United States under the 1960 security treaty.

Despite partisan differences, all political parties and groups were nearly unanimous during the 1970s and 1980s that Japan should exercise more independence and initiative in foreign affairs and not appear so ready to follow the United States on matters affecting Japan's interests. They also agreed that Japan should continue to prohibit the introduction of nuclear weapons into the country. These shared views stemmed from the resurgence of nationalism during the post–World War II era and from the pride of the Japanese people in their own heritage and in the economic achievements of the postwar decades. Although there were indications that the "nuclear allergy" produced by Japan's traumatic experience with the atomic bombings of Hiroshima and Nagasaki in August 1945 was beginning to moderate, nuclear weapons remains a sensitive political issue.

Except for security-related matters, most foreign affairs issues involved economic interests and mainly attracted the attention of the specific groups affected. The role of interest groups in formulating foreign policy varied with the issue at hand. Because trade and capital investment issues were involved, for example, in relations with the People's Republic of China and with South Korea, the business community increasingly became an interested party in the conduct of foreign affairs. Similarly, when fishing rights or agricultural imports were being negotiated, representatives of the industries affected worked with political leaders and the foreign affairs bureaucracies in shaping policy.

Because of the continuous control of the government enjoyed by the LDP since its formation in 1955, the policy-making bodies of the LDP had become the centers of government policy formulation. Because the unified will of the majority party almost invariably prevailed in the Diet, some observers believed that the Diet had been reduced to a mere sounding board for government policy pronouncements and a rubber-stamp ratifier of decisions made by the prime minister and his cabinet. This situation meant that significant debate and deliberations on foreign policy matters generally took place not in the Diet but in closed-door meetings of the governing LDP. Deliberations took place, for example, between representatives of the Foreign Affairs Section of the LDP's Policy Research Council and officials of the Ministry of Foreign Affairs, the Ministry of International Trade and Industry, or leaders of major LDP support groups, such as the Federation of Economic Organizations (Keizai Dantai Rengokai—better known as Keidanren). The loss of the LDP majority in the July 1993 election for the House of Representatives was bound to affect this situation, but it remained to be seen how it would affect it.

The role of public opinion in the formulation of foreign policy throughout the postwar period has been difficult to determine. Japan continued to be extremely concerned with public opinion, and opinion polling became a conspicuous feature of national life. The large number of polls on public policy issues, including foreign policy matters, conducted by the Office of the Prime Minister, the Ministry of Foreign Affairs, other government organizations, and the media led to the presumption by analysts that the collective opinions of voters do exert significant influence on policymakers. The public attitudes toward foreign policy that had held throughout much of the postwar period appeared to have shifted in the 1980s. Opinion polls reflected a marked increase in national pride and self-esteem. Moreover, public discussion of security matters by government officials, political party leaders, press commentators, and academics had become markedly less volatile and doctrinaire and more open and pragmatic, suggesting indirectly that public attitudes on this subject had evolved as well.

The mass media, and particularly the press, as the champion of the public interest and critic of the government, continues to mold public attitudes strongly. The media is the chief source of demands that the government exercise a more independent and less "weak-kneed" diplomacy in view of the changing world situation and Japan's increased stature in the world. An example of this attitude has been the continued support for whaling through the International Whaling Commission that has brought increasing opposition from several important trading partner countries such as the US, the UK, New Zealand and Australia.

== Anti-terrorism As a Part of Japanese Foreign Policy ==
Japan, since the end of the WWII has operated via a policy of pacifism and passivism. This began to change in the late eighties and early nineties, in tandem with a shift in national identity, as understood via a change in its conception of its international role as a great economic power. Among the major catalysts were a shift in Japan's national security objectives, and widespread criticism of its “checkbook diplomacy” policy during the first Gulf War. This shift, ultimately, moved Japan from the realm of pacifism into a more activist assertive power. It was characterized by increased participation in international and regional organizations (monetarily) and by increased participation in global Peace-Keeping operations and in conflict resolution more broadly, under the umbrella of the UN. Japan's anti-terrorism policy can be seen as a part of this broader foreign policy platform, as it stems from these large objectives. Its anti-terrorism policy is an integral part of its larger foreign policy objectives, which are 1) the maintenance of the US/Japanese security alliance 2) continued international peace and security 3) a moderate defense buildup. This last objective is new, and ends up being very connected to its anti-terrorism policies. This represents some concern for the US as it signals the beginning of a more independent Japan in the future, but for the time being it hasn't resulted in any significant increase in Japanese independence from the US in terms of foreign policy formation, especially as it relates to anti-terrorism.

== See also ==
- Foreign relations of Japan
- Japanese foreign policy on Southeast Asia
- Economic relations of Japan
- Ministry of Foreign Affairs (Japan)
- Fukuda Doctrine
