= Paul Midford =

American Japanologist

Paul Midford is an American political scientist who specializes in Japanese foreign policy. He teaches at the Meiji Gakuin University in Japan.

== Early life and education ==
Midford holds a bachelor's degree from Pomona College from 1987, a master's degree in international politics from Columbia University from 1990, a master's degree in political science from the same institution from 2000 and a doctorate from 2001.

== Career ==
Midford researched and taught at Japanese universities and research institutes for twelve years between 1992 and 2005. During that time, he was a visiting research student at Aoyama Gakuin University in Tokyo from 1992 to 1994, and a visiting researcher at the Research Institute for Peace and Security. He taught international and comparative politics at Kanazawa University from 1997 until 2001. During 2001-2002 Midford taught as a visiting assistant professor in the Department of Law and Government at Lafayette College in Easton, Pennsylvania. In September 2002, Midford returned to Japan to work as an associate professor (2002–2004), and then as a professor (2004–2005) at Kwansei Gakuin University in Sanda, Hyōgo prefecture. In August 2005 Midford moved to Trondheim, Norway, where he was hired as an Associate Professor in the Department of Sociology and Political Science and the head of the Norwegian University of Science and Technology Japan Program; in 2011 he was promoted to full professor.

== Research ==
Midford’s research centers on reputation and reassurance in international security, and Japan’s security and foreign policies, especially toward Asia. One line of his research focuses on Japan’s reputational problem as a military power in East Asia after 1945 and its attempts to reassure neighboring countries that Japan can be trusted as a military power. He has identified Japan’s promotion of regional security multilateralism as a new pillar of Japan’s reassurance strategy since the end of the Cold War. Another line of research focuses on the impact of public opinion on policy, especially security policy, and here Midford introduced the concept of attitudinal defensive realism for understanding Japanese public attitudes toward security, and how they differ from pacifism. Finally, Midford also researches the influence of public opinion on energy policy, especially renewable energy.

== Bibliography ==
=== Books ===
- Midford, Paul (2020). Overcoming Isolationism: Japan’s Leadership in East Asian Security Multilateralism (Stanford, California: Stanford University Press).
- Midford, Paul (2011). Rethinking Japanese Public Opinion and Security: From Pacifism to Realism? (Stanford, California: Stanford University Press).
- Japanese Public Opinion and the War on Terrorism: Implications for Japan’s Security Strategy, Policy Study #27 (East-West Center Washington Office, 2006) (65 pages).

=== Edited volumes ===
- Vosse, Wilhelm; Midford, Paul, eds. (2018). Japan’s new security partnerships: Beyond the Security Alliance (Manchester, UK: Manchester University Press).
- Midford, Paul; Moe, Espen, eds., (2020). New Challenges and Solutions for Renewable Energy: Japan, East Asia and Northern Europe (New York: Palgrave Macmillan).
- Midford, Paul; Vosse, Wilhelm, eds. (2020). New Directions in Japan’s Security: Non-U.S. Centric Evolution (London: Routledge, forthcoming in 2020).
- Berkofsky, Axel; Hughes, Christopher W.; Midford, Paul; Söderberg, Marie, eds. (2019). The EU-Japan Partnership in the Shadow of China: The Crisis of Liberalism (London: Routledge).
- Eldridge, Robert D.; Midford, Paul, eds. (2017). The Japanese Ground Self Defense Force: Search for Legitimacy (New York: Palgrave Macmillan).
- Campbell, John; Edvardsen, Unni; Midford, Paul; Saito Yayoi eds. (2014). Eldercare Policies in Japan and Norway: Aging Societies East and West (New York: Palgrave, 2014).
- Moe, Espen; Midford, Paul, eds. (2014). The Political Economy of Renewable Energy and Energy Security: Challenges and National Responses in Japan, China and Europe (London: Palgrave Macmillan).
- Eldridge, Robert; Midford, Paul, eds. (2008). Japanese Public Opinion and the War on Terrorism. (New York: Palgrave Macmillan).
