= Antimilitarism =

Opposition to militarism

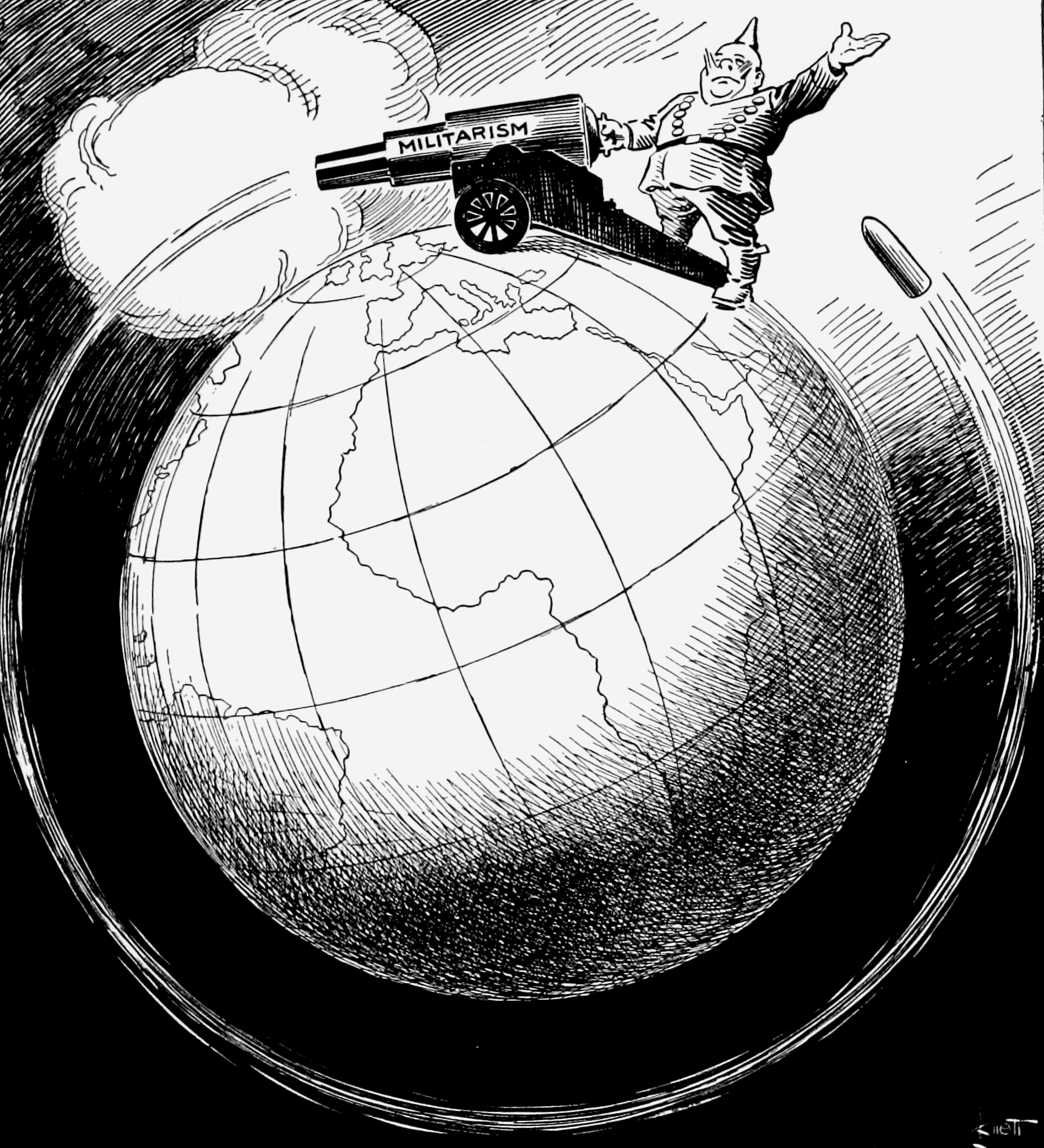
It Shoots Further Than He Dreams. Antimilitarist cartoon by John F. Knott. First published in March 1918.

Antimilitarism (also spelt anti-militarism) is a doctrine that opposes militarism. Whereas pacifism is the doctrine that disputes (especially between countries) should be settled without recourse to violence, Paul B. Miller defines anti-militarism as "ideology and activities...aimed at reducing the civil power of the military and ultimately, preventing international war". Cynthia Cockburn defines an anti-militarist movement as one opposed to "military rule, high military expenditure or the imposition of foreign bases in their country". Martin Ceadel points out that anti-militarism is sometimes equated with pacificism—general opposition to war or violence, except in cases where force is deemed necessary to advance the cause of peace.

== Distinction between antimilitarism and pacifism ==
Pacifism is the belief that disputes between nations can and should be settled peacefully. It is the opposition to war and the use of violence as a means of settling disputes. It can include the refusal to participate in military action.

Antimilitarism, relying heavily on a critical theory of imperialism, does not reject war in all circumstances, but rejects the belief or desire to maintain a large and strong military organization in aggressive preparedness for war.

== Criticisms on violence ==
Cover of the Piano Score for the light opera The Chocolate Soldier, based on George Bernard Shaw's Arms and the Man – both of which make fun of armies and militarist virtues and present positively a deserter who runs away from the battlefield and who carries chocolate instead of ammunition.

Syndicalist Georges Sorel advocated the use of violence as a form of direct action, calling it "revolutionary violence", which he opposed in Reflections on Violence (1908) to the violence inherent in class struggle. Similarities are seen between Sorel and the International Workingmens' Association (IWA) theorization of propaganda of the deed.

Walter Benjamin, in his Critique of Violence (1920) demarcates a difference between "violence that founds the law", and "violence that conserves the law", on one hand, and on the other hand, a "divine violence" that breaks the "magic circle" between both types of "state violence". What distinguishes these two kinds of violence fundamentally is their mode of operation; whereas law-establishing and law-preserving violence operate instrumentally on a continuum of means and ends, wherein the means of physical violence justify the political-juridical ends of the law, the Benjaminian concept of 'divine violence' is unique insofar as it is a bloodless violence 'of pure means' through which the law itself is destroyed. The example Benjamin provides in his essay is that of a General Strike, the latter of which is a key element of Sorel's Reflections on Violence (cited in this essay by Benjamin). The "violence that conserves the law" is roughly equivalent to the state's monopoly of legitimate violence. The "violence that founds the law" is the original violence necessary to the creation of a state. "Revolutionary violence" removes itself from the sphere of the law by shattering its instrumental logic of violence (i.e. its deployment of violence as a means of instituting, preserving and enforcing its own authority).

Giorgio Agamben showed the theoretical link between the law and violence permitted Nazi-thinker Carl Schmitt to justify the "state of exception" as the characteristic of sovereignty. Thus indefinite suspension of the law may only be blocked by breaking this link between violence and right.

== Effects of war ==
Disability-adjusted life year for war per 100,000 inhabitants in 2004 no data less than 100 100–200 200–600 600–1000 1000–1400 1400–1800 1800–2200 2200–2600 2600–3000 3000–8000 8000–8800 more than 8800

The effects of war are widely spread and can be long-term or short-term. Soldiers experience war differently than civilians. Although both suffer in times of war, women and children suffer atrocities in particular. In the past decade, up to two million of those killed in armed conflicts were children. The widespread trauma caused by these atrocities and suffering of the civilian population is another legacy of these conflicts, the following creates extensive emotional and psychological stress. Present-day internal wars generally take a larger toll on civilians than state wars. This is due to the increasing trend where combatants have made targeting civilians a strategic objective.

A state conflict is an armed conflict that occurs with the use of armed force between two parties, of which one is the government of a state. "The three problems posed by state conflict are the willingness of UN members, particularly the strongest member, to intervene; the structural ability of the UN to respond; and whether the traditional principles of peacekeeping should be applied to intra‐state conflict". Effects of war also include mass destruction of cities and have long lasting effects on a country's economy. Armed conflict has important indirect negative consequences on infrastructure, public health provision, and social order.

== Effects of military spending ==
Whole libraries have been written about the use of weapons in armed conflict. Far less has been said about their effects on sustainable development, which is crucial from a human security perspective.

The IPB contrasts the high levels of military spending (estimated by the Stockholm International Peace Research Institute in 2011 as being US $1,738 billion at worldwide level) against, for instance, the failure to fulfill the pledges of the Millennium Development Goals suggesting that, in general: "Research on the causes of violent conflicts shows myriad factors, but does not indicate that building bigger armies is the key to keeping a county safe from warfare. In fact, funds spent on weapons may drain resources from social, political, and economic development that may address root causes of conflict." The amount of money spent on the defense sector equals $4.7 billion a day or $249 per person. According to the World Bank and the Office of Disarmament Affairs (ODA), only about 5% of this amount would be needed each year to achieve the Millennium Development Goals by 2015.

The negative effects of high militarization include not just the direct ones of money and resources being spent on weapons systems instead of being used for human development but also the associated costs of negative health consequences of research, development, testing and even the safe decommissioning of such weapons, especially nuclear, biological and chemical ones.

As is obvious, the greater the military expenditure, the less there is left to spend on other aspects, both at communal but also at individual level, such as building and maintaining infrastructure, education and health.

In the words of Dwight D. Eisenhower: "Every gun that is made, every warship launched, every rocket fired signifies, in the final sense, a theft from those who hunger and are not fed".

== Henry David Thoreau ==
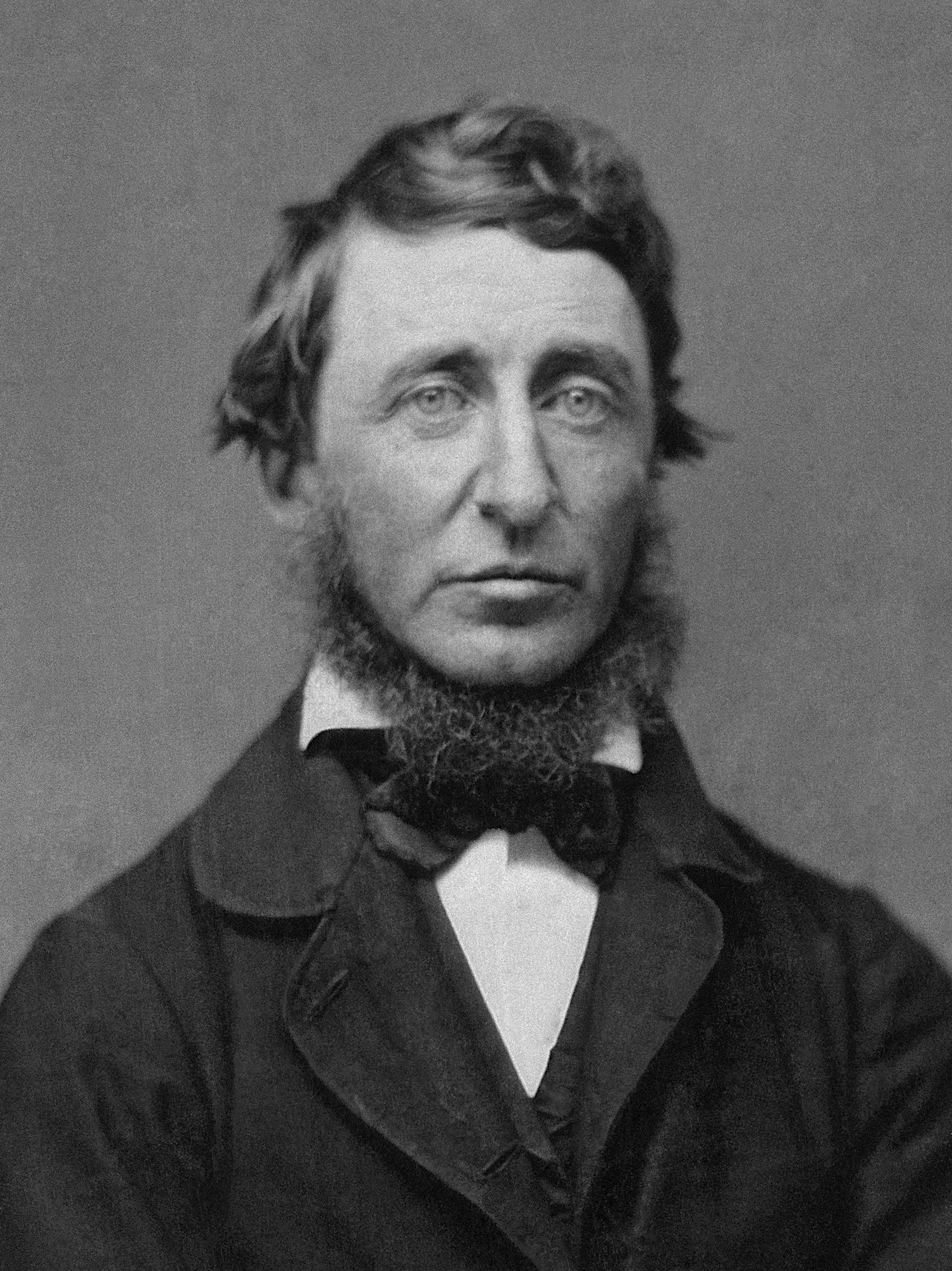
Henry David Thoreau

Henry David Thoreau's 1849 essay "Civil Disobedience", originally titled "Resistance to Civil Government", can be considered an antimilitarist point of view. His refusal to pay taxes is justified as an act of protest against slavery and against the Mexican–American War, in accordance with the practice of civil disobedience. (1846–48). He writes in his essay that the individual is not with obligations to the majority of the State. Instead, the individual should "break the law" if the law is "of such a nature that it requires you to be the agent of injustice to another."

== Capitalism and the military–industrial complex ==
Capitalism has often been thought by antimilitarist literature to be a major cause of wars, an influence which has been theorized by Vladimir Lenin and Rosa Luxemburg under the name of "imperialism". The military–industrial complex has been accused of "pushing for war" in pursuit of private economic or financial interests.

The Second International was opposed to the participation of the working classes in war, which was analyzed as a competition between different national bourgeois classes and different state imperialisms. The assassination of French socialist leader Jean Jaurès days before the proclamation of World War I resulted in massive participation in the coming war. In Mars; or, The Truth About War (1921), Alain criticizes the destruction brought about by militarism, and demonstrated that it wasn't patriotism that forced the soldiers to fight, but the bayonets behind them.

After World War II, US President Eisenhower's 1961 issued a warning on the influence of the "military–industrial complex".

== Right-wing antimilitarism in the United States ==
American right-wing antimilitarists draw heavily upon the statements of Thomas Jefferson and other Founding Fathers condemning standing armies and foreign entanglements. Jefferson's beliefs on maintaining a standing army are as follows: "There are instruments so dangerous to the rights of the nation and which place them so totally at the mercy of their governors that those governors, whether legislative or executive, should be restrained from keeping such instruments on foot but in well-defined cases. Such an instrument is a standing army."

Right-wing antimilitarists in the United States generally believe that "A well regulated militia, composed of the body of the people, trained to arms, is the best and most natural defense of a free country", as stated by James Madison. To this end, there is much overlap between the Militia movement and right-wing antimilitarists, although the two groups are not mutually inclusive. The term "well regulated" in the foregoing quote (and in the Second Amendment to the United States Constitution) is taken by such antimilitarists not to mean "regulated by the state" but rather "well equipped" and "in good working order", as was a common usage of the word "regulated" in the late 18th century.

An argument based on eugenics and racism was advanced by David Starr Jordan, ichthyologist and founding president of Stanford University, who believed that war killed off the best members of the gene pool, and initially opposed US involvement in World War I.

== Antimilitarism in Japan ==
After World War II Japan enacted its postwar constitution which, in Article 9, stated that "The Japanese people forever renounce war as a sovereign right of the nation and the threat or use of force as means of settling international disputes." Such antimilitarist constitution was based on the belief that Japan's military organizations were to blame for thrusting the country into World War II.

In Yasuhiro Izumikawa's article "Explaining Japanese Antimilitarism: Normative and Realist Constraints on Japan's Security Policy", the evidences for the constructivist's belief in the existence of the single norm of antimilitarism in Post war Japan are introduced. These evidences include the Yoshida Doctrine, adopted after the World War II, which emphasized the importance of Japan's economic development and acceptance of the U.S. security umbrella. Also, the institutional constraints imposed on Japan's security policy after World War II and Japan's Three Non-Nuclear Principles which is about not possessing, producing, or permitting the introduction of nuclear weapons into Japan are mentioned as the evidence for antimilitarism. In contrast to the constructivist's view, in Izumikawa's article, the realists are said to believe that the postwar security policy in Japan is a combination of pacifism, antitraditionalism, and the fear of entrapment rather than just being based on the single norm of antimilitarism.

However, the postwar constitution on which Japan's antimilitarism is based has seen some proposed amendments, and article 9 has been renounced by the Liberal Democratic Party. Some new legislation allows Japan's Self Defense Forces to act more like a conventional army, reinterpreting the constitutional restrictions. This legislation has been strongly opposed by Japanese opposition parties, especially the Japanese Communist Party, which is strongly opposed to militarism.

== Antimilitarist groups ==
Until its dissolution, the Second International was antimilitarist. Jaurès' assassination on July 31, 1914, marks antimilitarism's failure in the socialist movement. The American Union Against Militarism is an example of a US antimilitarist movement born in the midst of the First World War, from which the American Civil Liberties Union (ACLU) formed after the war. In 1968, Benjamin Spock signed the "Writers and Editors War Tax Protest" pledge, vowing to refuse tax payments in protest against the Vietnam War. He was also arrested for his involvement in anti-war protests resulting from his signing of the anti-war manifesto "A Call to Resist Illegitimate Authority" circulated by members of the collective RESIST. The individuals arrested during this incident came to be known as the Boston Five.

Some Refuseniks in Israel, who refuse the draft, and draft resisters in the US can be considered by some to be antimilitarist or pacifist.

War Resisters' International, formed in 1921, is an international network of pacifist and antimilitarist groups around the world, currently with 90 affiliated groups in over 40 countries.

== See also ==
- 2015 Japanese military legislation
- Anti-war movement
- Arms and the Man/The Chocolate Soldier a comedy by George Bernard Shaw
- Campaign for Nuclear Disarmament
- Civilian control of the military
- Coalition Against Militarism in Our Schools
- Conscientious objection to military taxation
- Conscientious objector
- Counter-recruitment
- Demilitarisation
- Disarmament
- Draft evasion
- Insubordinate movement in Spain
- Just war theory
- List of countries without armed forces
- Non-violence
- Peace Pledge Union
- Peace treaty
- Peace
- Peace process
- Refusal to serve in the Israeli military
- "Soldiers are murderers"
- Stop the War Coalition
- Three Non-Nuclear Principles
- War resister
- War Resisters' International
- Yoshida Doctrine
- Zimmerwald Conference
