= Japanese foreign policy on Southeast Asia =

Japanese foreign policy toward Southeast Asia, the diverse region stretching from South Asia to the islands in the South Pacific Ocean, was in part defined by Japan's rapid rise in the 1980s as the dominant economic power in Asia. The decline in East-West and Sino-Soviet tensions during the 1980s suggested that economic rather than military power would determine regional leadership. During the decade, Japan displaced the United States as the largest provider of new business investment and economic aid in the region, although the United States market remained a major source of Asia-Pacific dynamism.

Following the rise in value of the yen relative to the US dollar in the late-1980s (after the Plaza Accord), Japan's role as a capital and technology exporter and as an increasingly significant importer of Asian manufactured goods made it the core economy of the Asia-Pacific region.

Japan remains the largest donor of economic aid to the region.

== 1950s ==
From the mid-1950s to the late 1960s, Japan's relations with the rest of Asia were concerned mainly with promoting its far-flung, multiplying economic interests in the region through trade, technical assistance, and aid. Its main problems were the economic weakness and political instability of its trading partners and the growing apprehension of Asian leaders over Japan's "overpresence" in their region.

Japan began to normalize relations with its neighbors during the 1950s after a series of intermittent negotiations, which led to the payment of war reparations to Burma (now Myanmar), Indonesia, the Philippines, and the Republic of Vietnam (South Vietnam). Thailand's reparations claims were not settled until 1963. Japan's reintegration into the Asian scene was also facilitated by its having joined the Colombo Plan for Cooperative Economic and Social Development in Asia and the Pacific in December 1954 and by its attendance at the April 1955 Afro-Asian Conference in Bandung, Indonesia. In the late 1950s, Japan made a limited beginning in its aid program. In 1958 it extended the equivalent of US$50 million in credits to India, the first Japanese loan of its kind in post-World War II years. As in subsequent cases involving India, as well as Sri Lanka, Malaysia, Taiwan, Pakistan, and South Korea, these credits were rigidly bound to projects that promoted plant and equipment purchases from Japan. In 1960 Japan officially established the Institute of Asian Economic Affairs (renamed the Institute of Developing Economies in 1969) as the principal training center for its specialists in economic diplomacy.

== 1960s ==
In the early 1960s, the government adopted a more forward posture in seeking to establish contacts in Asia. In 1960 the Institute of Asian Economic Affairs was placed under the jurisdiction of the Ministry of International Trade and Industry (MITI). In 1961 the government established the Overseas Economic Cooperation Fund as a new lending agency. The following year the Overseas Technical Cooperation Agency made its debut.

By the mid-1960s, Japan's role had become highly visible in Asia as well as elsewhere in the world. In 1964 Japan became a full member of the Organisation for Economic Co-operation and Development (OECD). As economic and trade expansion burgeoned, leaders began to question the propriety and wisdom of what they variously described as "mere economism," an "export-first policy," and the "commercial motives of aid." They wanted to contribute more to the solution of the North-South problem, as they dubbed the issue—the tenuous relationship between the developed countries and the developing countries.

== 1970s ==
Efforts since the beginning of the 1970s to assume a leading role in promoting peace and stability in Asia, especially Southeast Asia, by providing economic aid and by offering to serve as a mediator in disputes, faced two constraints. Externally, there was fear in parts of Asia that Japan's systematic economic penetration into the region would eventually lead to something akin to its pre-World War II scheme to exploit Asian markets and materials. Internally, foreign policymakers were apprehensive that Japan's political involvement in the area in whatever capacity would almost certainly precipitate an anti-Japanese backlash and adversely affect its economic position.

After a reassessment of policy, the Japanese leadership appeared to have decided that more emphasis ought to be given to helping the developing countries of the region modernize their industrial bases to increase their self-reliance and economic resilience. In the late 1970s, Japan seemed to have decided that bilateral aid in the form of yen credits, tariff reductions, larger quota incentives for manufactured exports, and investments in processing industries, energy, agriculture, and education would be the focus of its aid programs in Asia.

== 1980s ==
In 1981, the ASEAN-Japan Centre was established to institutionalize the growing economic ties between Japan and the ASEAN countries. The establishment was partially driven by Japan’s wider foreign policy strategy towards Southeast Asia at the time, symbolized by the Fukuda Doctrine announced in 1977 in Manila.

== 1990s ==
By 1990 Japan's interaction with the vast majority of Asia-Pacific countries, especially its burgeoning economic exchanges, was multifaceted and increasingly important to the recipient countries. The developing countries of ASEAN (Brunei, Indonesia, Malaysia, the Philippines, and Thailand; Singapore was treated as a newly industrialized economy, or NIE) regarded Japan as critical to their development. Japan's aid to the ASEAN countries totaled US$1.9 billion in Japanese fiscal year (FY) 1988 versus about US$333 million for the United States during United States FY 1988. Japan was the number one foreign investor in the ASEAN countries, with cumulative investment as of March 1989 of about US$14.5 billion, more than twice that of the United States. Japan's share of total foreign investment in ASEAN countries in the same period ranged from 70 to 80 percent in Thailand to 20 percent in Indonesia.

In the early 1990s, the Japanese government was making a concerted effort to enhance its diplomatic stature, especially in Asia. Toshiki Kaifu's much publicized spring 1991 tour of five Southeast Asian nations—Malaysia, Brunei, Thailand, Singapore, and the Philippines—culminated in a May 3 major foreign policy address in Singapore, in which he called for a new partnership with the Association of Southeast Asian Nations (ASEAN) and pledged that Japan would go beyond the purely economic sphere to seek an "appropriate role in the political sphere as a nation of peace." As evidence of this new role, Japan took an active part in promoting negotiations to resolve the Cambodian conflict.

== See also ==
- Japan–Vietnam relations
- Japan–Philippines relations
- Japan–Indonesian relations
- Greater East Asia Co-Prosperity Sphere – historic euphemism for the Japanese colonies in Southeast Asia
