= Official Development Assistance (Japan) =

Arm of the Japanese Ministry of Foreign Affairs

The Official Development Assistance (政府開発援助, Seifukaihatsuenjo) is an arm of the Ministry of Foreign Affairs (Japan). The goal of the office is to help developing nations with supplies, civil engineering and other assistance. The ODA was started in 1954 after Japan signed the Colombo Plan, which pledges to provide aid to nations who need it. As of 2003, the ODA has provided over $221 billion USD to 185 nations and regions. The main institution that is managing Japanese ODA is Japan International Cooperation Agency.

== History ==
In February 2015, the decision was made to establish the Development Cooperation Charter as a means of taking a "proactive" approach to promoting peace and stability. Its approval allows Tokyo to grant monetary aid to foreign militaries for non-military operations. The DCC prioritizes Southeast Asia in granting aid.

The wording of the DCC is a bit ambiguous because it can be used to justify the financing of non-combat equipment like radar, aircraft and ISR equipment.

== New Alternative ==
The ODA is not permitted for defense or security applications. In Japan's revised National Security Strategy (NSS) of 2022, it was declared that a new cooperation framework for defense aid distinct from ODA would be created. This initiative, referred to as Japan's Official Security Assistance (OSA), was officially inaugurated in April 2023.

== Countries ==
=== China ===
Japanese ODA to China (1979–2013)

Japan's Official Development Assistance to China began in 1979 after the Treaty of Peace and Friendship between Japan and China signed in 1978. From 1979 to 2013, Japan has provided 24 billion USD in loan aid and 7,796 million dollar in grant aid including US$6,577 million in technical cooperation, a total of US$32 billion. Even in 2013, Japan still provided US$296 million loan and US$30 million grant.

== See also ==
- Fukuda Doctrine
- Official Development Assistance–Ferdinand Marcos scandal
