= International economic cooperation policy of Japan =

Japan emerged as one of the largest foreign aid donors in the world during the 1980s.

In 1991 Japan was the second largest foreign aid donor worldwide, behind the United States. Japan's ratio of foreign aid to GNP in this year was 0.32%, behind the 0.35% average for the OECD's Development Assistance Committee member countries, but ahead of the United States ratio of 0.20%.

The foreign aid program began in the 1960s out of the reparations payments Japan was obliged to pay to other Asian countries for war damage. The program's budget remained quite low until the late 1970s, when Japan came under increasing pressure from other industrial countries to play a larger role. During the 1980s, Japan's foreign aid budget grew quickly, despite the budget constraints imposed by the effort to reduce the fiscal deficit. From 1984 to 1991, the Official Development Assistance (ODA) budget increased at an average annual rate of 22.5%, reaching US$11.1 billion by 1991. Part of this rise was the result of exchange rate movements (with given yen amounts committed in the budget becoming larger dollar amounts). During the 1980s, foreign aid rose at a lower, but still strong, rate of between 4% and 12% annually in the government budget, with an average annual rate of growth from 1979 to 1988 of 8.6%.

During the 1970s, the government took positive measures to increase its Official Development Assistance (ODA) to developing countries and to contribute to the stabilization of the international trade and monetary system. These measures were generally welcomed abroad, although some countries felt that the steps taken were not executed as rapidly or were not as extensive as similar efforts by some other advanced industrialized nations. Japan's ODA increased tenfold during the decade and stood at US$3.3 billion in 1980, but this ODA as a percentage of GNP was still below the average of other donor countries.

In the 1980s, Japan's ODA continued to rise rapidly. ODA net disbursements, in nominal terms, averaged around US$3 billion per year in the early 1980s and then jumped to US$5.6 billion in 1986 and US$9.1 billion in 1990. Japan's share of total disbursements from major aid donors also grew significantly, from nearly 11.8% in 1979 to about 15% in the mid-1980s, and later to more than 19% in 1989 dropping back to under 17% in 1990. Japan's ODA as a percentage of its GNP, however, did not increase substantially during the 1980s, remaining at about 0.3%.

Japan continued to concentrate its economic assistance in Asia (about 60% of total commitments in 1990), reflecting its historical and economic ties to the region. Japan made modest increases in aid to Africa with the announcement in 1989 of a US$600 million grant program for the next three years. In 1990, Japan also pledged large amounts of assistance to Eastern Europe, but most of that aid was to be in the form of market rate credits and investment insurance, which did not qualify as ODA. In other regions, Japan appeared likely to continue allocating relatively small shares of assistance. Nevertheless, by 1987 Japan had become the largest bilateral donor in twenty-nine countries, nearly double the number in which that had been the case ten years earlier.

The continued growth of Japan's foreign aid appears to be motivated by two fundamental factors. First, Japanese policy is aimed at assuming international responsibilities commensurate with its position as a global economic power. Second, many believed, the growing Japanese foreign aid program comes largely in response to pressure from the United States and other allies for Japan to take on a greater share of the financial burdens in support of shared security, political, and economic interests.

Such assistance consisted of grants and loans and of support for multilateral aid organizations. In 1990 Japan allocated US$6.9 billion of its aid budget to bilateral assistance and US$2.3 billion to multilateral agencies. Of the bilateral assistance, US$3.0 billion went for grants and US$3.9 billion for concessional loans.

Japan's foreign aid program has been criticized for better serving the interests of Japanese corporations than those of developing countries. In the past, tied aid (grants or loans tied to the purchase of merchandise from Japan) was high, but untied aid expanded rapidly in the 1980s, reaching 71% of all aid by 1986. This share compared favorably with other Development Assistance Committee countries and with the United States corresponding figure of 54%. Nevertheless, complaints continued that even Japan's untied aid tended to be directed toward purchases from Japan. Aid in the form of grants (the share of aid disbursed as grants rather than as loans) was low relative to other Development Assistance Committee countries and remained so late in the 1980s.

Bilateral assistance was concentrated in the developing countries of Asia, although modest moves took place in the 1980s to expand the geographical scope of aid. In 1990 some 59.3% of bilateral development assistance was allocated to Asia, 11.4% to Africa, 10.2% to the Middle East, and 8.1% to Latin America. Asia's share was down somewhat, from 75% in 1975 and 70% in 1980, but still accounted for by far the largest share of bilateral aid. During the 1980s, increased aid went to Pakistan and Egypt, partly in response to pressure from the United States to provide such aid for strategic purposes. Japan had little involvement in Africa, but the severe drought of the 1980s brought an increase in the share of development assistance for that continent.

The five largest recipients of Japanese ODA in 1990 were in Asia: Indonesia (US$1.1 billion), People's Republic of China (US$832 million), Thailand (US$448.8 million), the Philippines (US$403.8 million), and Bangladesh (US$370.6 million). Earlier in the 1980s, China had been the largest single recipient for several successive years. These large aid amounts made Japan the largest single source of development assistance for most Asian countries. For the Association of Southeast Asian Nations (ASEAN) countries, for example, Japan supplied 55% of net ODA received in 1987, compared with 11% from the United States and only 10% from the multilateral aid agencies.

The rapid economic growth and rising competitiveness of China readjusted Sino-Japanese relations, and ODA and yen loans to China will gradually phase out until the 2008 Summer Olympics in Beijing.

The largest use of Japan's bilateral aid is for economic infrastructure (transportation, communications, river development, and energy development), which accounted for 31.5% of the total in 1990. Smaller shares went to development of the production sector (17.1%) and social infrastructure (19.7%). In general, large construction projects predominate in Japan's bilateral foreign aid. Within the category of social infrastructure, education absorbed 6.7% of the bilateral aid in 1990, water supply and sanitation made up 3.4%, and only 2% went for health. Food aid (0.4% of total bilateral aid in 1990) and debt relief (4.3%) also were included in Japan's official development assistance.

In January, 2022, it was announced that Japan planned to begin incorporating security assistance into foreign aid. Until now, Japan has only provided foreign aid for nonmilitary purposes. The change comes amid a broader policy shift that includes an increase in defense spending.

== See also ==
- Foreign aid institutions of Japan
- Fukuda Doctrine
