= Fukuda Doctrine =

Japanese foreign policy doctrine

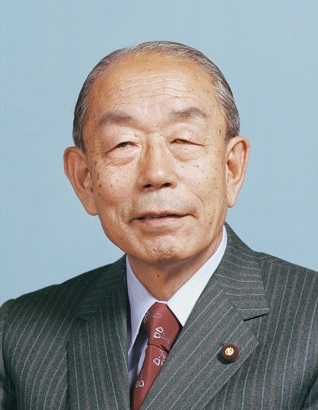
Prime Minister Takeo Fukuda

The Fukuda Doctrine (福田 ドクトリン, Fukuda dokutorin) is a Japanese foreign policy doctrine, based on a 1977 speech by Japanese Prime Minister Takeo Fukuda, stating that Japan would never become a military power. On the contrary, the policy proposes to enhance relations with Southeast Asian countries in wide-ranging fields, as well as to increase cooperation with the Association of Southeast Asian Nations (ASEAN) and its member countries. The Fukuda Doctrine serves as the foundation of Japanese diplomacy toward the rest of Asia.

== Historical background ==
=== Takeo Fukuda ===
Takeo Fukuda was an expert in economics. He took on the role of an ‘economic prime minister’ under Miki's administration from 1974 to 1976. During this time, he established the Ministerial Conference on Economic Measures, enabling cross-ministry and agency talks on finance, wage and labor issues. Fukuda subsequently became the 67th prime minister of Japan, lasting for only one term from 1976 to 1978. However, he was not forced out of office before he had gotten two major diplomatic reforms executed. Under the Fukuda cabinet, Japan conducted an omnidirectional peace diplomacy, and signed Japan-China Treaty of Peace and Friendship in 1978. He pushed forward Japan's pacifistic position while making an effort to strengthen relations with Asian countries.

=== Phases of Japan’s Southeast Asian Policy prior to the Fukuda Doctrine ===
After the Second World War, Japan's policies towards Southeast Asia, can be divided into two distinct phases - a period of reparations (1952-1964) and a period of regional economic development (1965-1975). The historic events and the features of those periods have contributed to the development of Fukuda Doctrine and the subsequent policies towards the region.

==== Period of Reparations (1952-1964) ====
The first period in the relationship between Japan and Southeast Asia, can be characterized by Shigeru Yoshida’s “Economic Diplomacy”, officially promulgated in 1957. The so-called “Yoshida Doctrine” put high priority on development and aimed at peaceful expansion of Japan's economic power in foreign markets, in order to rebuild the economy and raise the living standards of the Japanese population. As a part of this policy, Japan sought to improve ties with the Southeast Asian region. Reparations settlements between Japan and Southeast Asian countries played a significant role in such environment as they served as a tool which provided a ground for rebuilding of the relations, severed by Japanese aggression during the war. During this period, Japan paid reparations to Burma, Philippines, Indonesia, Republic of Vietnam (South Vietnam). Other than reparations in the strict sense, Japan also provided “quasi-reparations” in the form of grants and aid to Laos, Thailand, Malaysia, Singapore. This way, reparation payments paved the way for Japan's economic involvement in Southeast Asia, allowing it to pursue economic interest in the region.

Another aspect of this period, again motivated by the goal of expanding Japan's economy, is the policy of a triangular relationship with the US and Southeast Asia. This strategy, coordinated with US Cold War policies, aimed at bringing together Japanese know-how, US capital and Southeast Asian raw materials, in order to secure strategic resources and sustain the economic growth.

==== Period of Regional Economic Development (1965-1975) ====
The second phase of Japanese policy towards Southeast Asia is characterized with the active involvement of Japan in the region's development. This was partly due to the increasing pressure from the international community that Japan share a burden on the international arena as a “developed” country. On the other hand, this shift towards participation in the region was motivated by the new US policy on the development of Southeast Asia that aimed to protect South Vietnam from communist expansion. These changes contributed to the extensive Japanese engagement towards Southeast Asia, manifested through huge investments of capital and the involvement in development plans and projects. During this period Japan assisted the establishment of Asian Development Bank; the Asian and Pacific Council (ASPAC); the Ministerial Conference for the Economic Development of Southeast Asia etc. In spite of the increased involvement, however, the essence of the Japanese policy didn't change significantly, as it remained focused on the triangular relationship it was fostering.

During the early 1970s Japan was at the turning point for its post-war process, after Okinawa's reversion, and the normalization of Sino-Japanese diplomatic relations. However it had no clear vision for its future diplomatic policies. Meanwhile, the international society continued viewing Japan as solely pursuing its own economic interests. With the end of the Vietnam war in 1975 and the US withdrawal from the region, Japan was expected to take on international responsibility in Southeast Asia. As a result, Japan became determined that as the second-biggest economic power at the time, it should make international contribution to the region, setting the starting point of the vision of the Fukuda doctrine.

=== Japan-ASEAN relations prior to the Fukuda Doctrine (1967-1977) ===
Japan initially viewed ASEAN as economically strategic, but remained insouciant to the association until the early 1970s. ASEAN was established at a time when the Japanese government was prioritizing the reversion of Okinawa from the United States over an active role in the ASEAN region. When Japan was rid of the Okinawa problem, attitude towards ASEAN had already turned negative. ASEAN's adoption of a neutralization policy in 1971 was deleterious to Japan's foreign policy on supporting an organization that incorporated neutralization.

Towards 1975, however, the Tokyo government had no choice but to abandon its foreign policy on minimal involvement with organization embodying neutralization, and to establish negotiations with ASEAN countries. The growing fear of Japan's economic domination amongst Southeast Asian nations resulted in collective actions by ASEAN against Japan, exemplified by acute anti-Japanese demonstrations.

Changes in Southeast Asian security environment following the new realities of 1975 engendered a major shift in Japan's approach to foreign policy in the region. Prior to 1975, conflict between East and West defined the security of ASEAN in purely military terms, which also meant the insignificant role of Japan in the view of ASEAN nations. After the liberation of Vietnam and the fall of Kampuchea government to the communists, combined with the declining presence of American forces in Southeast Asia, ASEAN nations began to perceive their own security in terms of raising the standard of living of their people. The recognition that military power alone could not secure ASEAN interests gave way to a new priority of economic well-being. This change in priority led to a redefinition of security from that of a military perspective to one that was economic, wherein Japan could play a decisive role in contributing to ASEAN economic development and political stability.

== Core Elements of the Doctrine ==
=== Japan Rejects the Role of a Military Power ===
"First, Japan, a nation committed to peace, rejects the role of a military power”

Fukuda stated that even though Japan had the capability to rearm and to produce nuclear weapons, it steered clear of resurrecting its military past. Fukuda used article 9 of the 1946 constitution to reassert Japan's pacifist stance post-war. For the ASEAN nations and Southeast Asia as a whole, this statement served as a psychological reassurance to the memories of Japanese aggression in the second world war.

=== Japan Increases Mutual Confidence and Trust ===
"Second, Japan, as a true friend of the countries of Southeast Asia will do its best for consolidating the relationship of mutual confidence and trust based on “heart-to-heart” understanding with these countries”

The Prime Minister called for mutual confidence and trust between Japan and ASEAN by emphasizing the words “heart to heart” in his definition of a development of relation between Japan and ASEAN.

=== Japan as an Equal Partner of ASEAN: Mutual Dependence ===
"Third, Japan will be an equal partner of ASEAN and its member countries, and cooperate positively with them in their own efforts to strengthen their solidarity and resilience"

Fukuda declared Japan as “an equal partner” who would “walk hand-in-hand with ASEAN.” The word “equal” implied the fear of Japanese economic dominance (“economic animal”) amongst ASEAN members – by being “an equal partner,” Japan would no longer seek dominance in the Asian scene nor would it regard other Asian nations as inferior to itself.

== Goals of the Doctrine ==
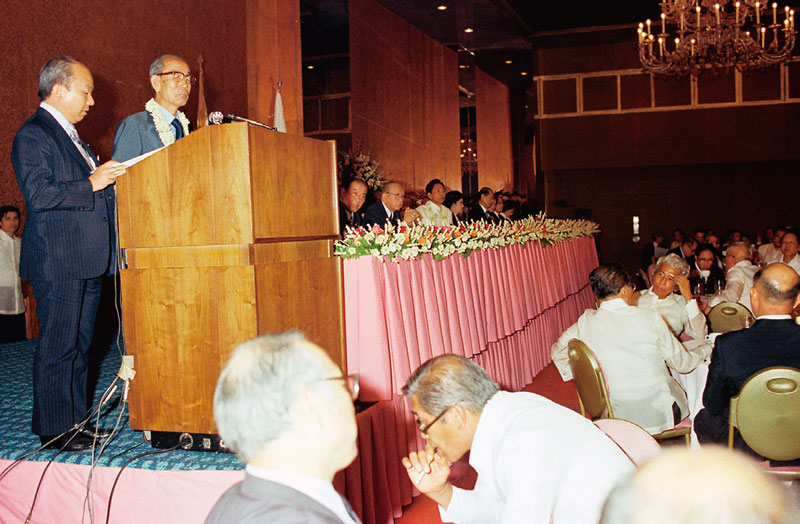
Prime Minister Takeo Fukuda announcing the Fukuda Doctrine in Manila, Philippines

=== Role of Securing Stable Coexistence between ASEAN and Indochina ===
Japan's efforts to providing itself a political role in ASEAN and Indochina was dubbed a neo-realist approach, made possible by a declining United States presence and commitments in Southeast Asia. This approach, manifested by the rejection of military force and emphasis on economic power, demonstrated Japan's belief in the use of soft power. It was for this very reason that Japan was so keen on encouraging the development of multilateralism in Southeast Asia.

This approach to foreign policy in a sense was intended to establish a ‘political coordination’ between Japan and ASEAN as a regional actor. Fukuda had warned, in the area of trade, it was not in Japan's interest to form an exclusivist economic bloc with ASEAN. The Prime Minister's warning in effect functioned as a switch to a ‘political role’ in ASEAN and Indochina from its conventional practice of providing economic assistance. Moreover, by forging close diplomatic ties, what Sueo Sudo calls a ‘special relationship,’ with the organization through the use of FDI, ODA and other financial aids, Japan would try to establish a greater role for itself in the development of ASEAN region. Fukuda further implied Japan's responsibility in the region and its larger role as a world leader by acting as an informant on current developments in international issues that could directly affect member nations.

=== Provide an Alternative to the Soviet Union and PRC ===
The sudden American withdrawal from Indochina left Southeast Asia vulnerable to pressure from the Soviet Union and People's Republic of China (PRC), both of which were not in the interest of Japan.

The Soviet Union and China, aware of an opportunity presented in Southeast Asia following the decline of U.S. hegemony in the region, grappled for influence. China, in particular, was concerned with the “Soviet hegemony” in the internal communist movement and took concrete measures to prevent further Soviet influence. The 1978 Asia visit to Malaysia and Singapore by Prime Minister Deng Xiaoping reflected PRC's attempt to win over the ASEAN governments as an ally capable of supporting PRC's interest in the region. On the other hand, the Soviet Union developed a thought-control system in which it would try to coax Southeast Asian nations into thinking of Chinese diplomacy as a form of new imperialism. The Soviet deputy foreign minister visit to ASEAN states to discuss on friendship treaties and economic aids stands as a strong proof for its determination in Southeast Asia during the 1970s. Japan, imbibing all the happenings and changes in the power balance in Southeast Asia, feared for its position, security, and economy which, until the early 1970s, had been under the United States wing. As the last resort to curb further communist influence, Japan decided to offer itself as an alternative power base of Asia. Argued by Haddad, this goal is perhaps the true “thrust of the Fukuda doctrine.”

To exercise power politics, Japan took responsibility for the strengthening of member states’ economies and the inculcation in ASEAN a belief in the idea of peaceful coexistence with the three communist states of Laos, Kampuchea and Vietnam. The strengthening of ASEAN economies would raise the standard of living of the people, hence improving the image of Japan in the region. Moreover, the peaceful coexistence belief undergirded by Japan would serve as a bulwark against the penetration of Soviet Union and People's Republic of China. ASEAN was initially formed as a non-communist alliance, which meant the members shared a common feeling of threat from the Indochinese communist states. Malaysia and Thailand, in particular, bordered these states and were exercising joint military operations along their borders against communist guerrillas. This consternation worked to Japan's advantage. ASEAN needed a strong base against communist influence as the U.S. withdrew from the region, and Japan was the only power within suitable distance. As Thai Commerce Minister Suthi alluded on the relationship between Japan and Southeast Asia, “Thailand is a country which is adjacent to communist nations…Japan and Thailand have the relationship of mutual dependence and assistance. The development of Thailand also serves to ensure Japan’s security.” The statement implied the close connection between Japan and Southeast Asian nations' security.

== Subsequent Developments of Japan’s Policies ==
The Japanese policies after the promulgation of the Fukuda Doctrine in regards to Southeast Asia can be divided into three main areas: bridging the gap between ASEAN and Indochina; serving as economic model and providing economic assistance; and promoting Japanese soft power.

=== Political Role of Bridging the Gap in Southeast Asia ===
After the end of the Vietnam War, Japanese assumed a political role of bridging the gap between Indochina and ASEAN. It attempted to utilize economic assistance to foster better relationships between the three Indochinese countries Vietnam, Laos, Cambodia and the other states in the region. In regards to building bridges between Southeast Asian countries with Vietnam in particular, Japan employed two tactics. First, it granted economic aid to Hanoi, hoping that it would be used to purchase commodities from other ASEAN countries. It was argued that with developing economic ties, the relations between the two sides would improve. Second, Japan attempted, to resort to discontinuation of its aid to Hanoi in order to exert pressure on the latter's behavior toward neighboring countries. In addition, Japan tried to assist the postwar reconstruction of the country, by providing grant of 55 million dollars to the Government of South Vietnam for the purchase of necessary Japanese equipment and materials.

At the end of 1978, however, Japan's current policy towards Vietnam could no longer continue, as Vietnam invaded Cambodia - an act widely condemned by the international community, including US, China and most of ASEAN members. In April 1979 Japan notified, unofficially, Vietnam the freeze of all assistance and made renewal contingency upon Vietnamese withdrawal from Cambodia. In addition, following the US stance on the issue, Japan continued to see the Government of Democratic Kampuchea as the legitimate government of Cambodia and refused to recognize the Government set by Vietnam in Phnom Penh. It may be argued that it would have been more beneficial to Japan to have a softer stance to Vietnam and keep the channels of dialogue open, however it was not ready to assume such political role and part ways with the US. This showed that even after the Fukuda Doctrine, there was still a large discrepancy between Japan's economic power and its political role in the international arena.

Yet, in spite of Japan's failure to play a political role of building bridges in regards to Indochina and Vietnam in particular, Japan managed to strengthen its position in the region. Following the Vietnamese invasion of Kampuchea, it undertook to provide increased economic assistance, especially to Thailand to help the country cope with the new menace from Indochina, supporting the "front line" state of the conflict.

=== The Role of Economic Assistance ===
The second area of development of Japanese policies after the Fukuda Doctrine is Japan's economic strategy towards Southeast Asia. During the 1970s Japan realized the importance of furthering the interests of Japanese businesses and included this component in its foreign policy. This coincided with the assumption that Japan has achieved the third stage of the “flying geese” pattern of development - an economic model that was influential to Japanese lawmakers at the time. That change encouraged transfers of labor-intensive industries to Southeast Asia. Southeast Asian countries were also eager to receive Japanese Foreign Direct Investment (FDI) in the pursuit of their own industrialization. The transfer was further supported by Japanese Official Development Assistance (ODA), which at the time was mainly tied aid. It paved the way for Japanese businesses to work on development projects and promoted the penetration for Japanese FDI in the region. As a result of this convergence of interests, Southeast Asian countries first welcomed Japanese textile industries, then electronics and vehicle-assembly businesses, contributing to the development of new economic links.

FDI's role increased even more during the 80s, after the Plaza Accord of 1985, that appreciated the yen and gave an incentive to Japanese companies to produce abroad. The main beneficiaries of those increased capital flows were Indonesia, Singapore and Thailand. By 1992 Japan had become the largest investor in the region, excluding the Philippines, where the US still remained in the first place.

Aid also came from the private sector. In July 1977, the Overseas Trade Development Association Foundation of Japan (OTDAF) revised its rules, easing restrictions on loans to medium and small Japanese companies’ overseas investments. The new rule allowed firms to request for loans even if it did not hold more than 50% of the investment.

Following the Fukuda Doctrine, Japan undertook major changes in terms of its ODA. As the international community had started to recognize Japan as a developed country, it had to start bearing the accompanying responsibilities. After the US's withdrawal from the region, Japan had to replace America's presence with an expansion of aid and trade networks in the region. For that purpose Japan undertook to increase ODA in 1978, announcing a plan to double its ODA in three years in the First Medium-Term Target of ODA. In that spirit, Japan's ODA dramatically grew in magnitude from the late 1970s throughout the 1980s. In 1983 it became the third largest donor country among the DAC members and the second largest in 1986. Over 30% of the total Japanese ODA by 1980 was directed to Southeast Asia, with the main recipient being Indonesia, followed by Thailand, Philippines and Malaysia.

In addition to this rapid expansion of the amount of ODA, Japan launched another major change. Due to the growing criticisms by industrial nations of the commercial orientation of Japanese aid and its vast foreign trade surplus, combined with US pressure to eliminate tied ODA loans, in 1978 Japan decided to start untying its aid. It issued a joint communiqué with the US, announcing these intentions. The move was going to make the Japanese development projects accessible to other companies, especially allowing US companies to compete for Japanese aid-funded contracts. The process of untying continued during the 1980s and 1990s with the levels of untied loans increasing from 65.2% in 1980 to 97.7 in 1995.

In regards to the shaping of “special” relationship with ASEAN, Japan engaged with the organization in many ways, including negotiations to establish the Common Fund, the International Tin Agreement, rubber and sugar agreements. In the 1977 Second Japan-ASEAN Forum various agreements were reached - such as providing 1 billion to ASEAN industrial projects; further study of STABEX (export stabilization) by a joint committee of Japanese and ASEAN experts; reduction of tariff and non-tariff barriers and improvement of the generalized preference system for ASEAN products within the framework of the Tokyo Round; establishment of cultural exchange programs. And although all of these agreements were implemented in the following years (except STABEX), economic cooperation between Japan and ASEAN did not progress significantly, leading to ASEAN's dissatisfaction. Even after Japan's reduction of tariffs in 1978 on a number of products, including coconut oil, palm oil, bananas, shrimps, and canned pineapples, ASEAN still demanded much larger concessions. It can be argued that in a sense, Fukuda's aspirations for "heart-to-heart" relations had unexpectedly raised ASEAN's hopes for Japan's economic offers to the region. In the following years trade negotiations became the core aspect of Japan-ASEAN economic relations. However, as economic cooperation progressed rather slowly, criticisms and negative feelings dominated Japan-ASEAN relations.

=== Japanese Soft Power and Promoting Japanese Image ===
One of the reasons for the birth of the Fukuda Doctrine was partly the concern for Japan's image in Southeast Asia. It may be argued that the rise of anti-Japanese feelings in the 1970s and the backlash toward the rapidly increasing dependence on Japan in regards to trade, investment and assistance contributed to the formulation of the doctrine. As it is described by Kazuo Ogoura: “Some people sarcastically labelled the country “Faceless Japan” or “Banana Japan”, the latter implying that the Japanese did not understand Asia because they were yellow on the outside (Asian in appearance) but white on the inside (Western in thinking).”

These sentiments had an influence in the way Japan established its future policies. The country decided to project its soft power as a mean to broaden its relations beyond the economic field, further contributing to long-term stable ties with Southeast Asia. The Japanese strategy was adopted based on two main factors: Japan becoming the second biggest world economy and model for Asian countries; the inability of other Asian countries to utilize soft-power in the same manner. The soft power approach included various elements, such as economic influence (ODA) and socio-cultural aspects (promotion of culture, exchanges, and cooperation on different levels).

As a part of that policy, the ASEAN Cultural Fund was established in 1977 to promote intra-ASEAN cultural exchanges as well as between ASEAN countries and third parties. Two years later, in 1979 the Southeast Asia Youth Invitation Program was set to encourage better mutual understanding through the invitation of outstanding young Southeast Asian leaders to Japan. A Japan Scholarship Fund for ASEAN Youth for a yearly amount of 3 million dollars was also established. Other initiatives included: the Human Resources Development Project (1981); the Japan-ASEAN Research Cooperation Fund (1982) promoting intra-ASEAN area studies and Japan-ASEAN academic exchange; the ASEAN Japan Friendship Program for the 21st Century (1983) promoting students trips and exchanges.

== Problems Faced by the Doctrine ==
The doctrine was not without problems, at least on the Japanese side. Immediately following the agreement on setting aside 1 billion yen to fund construction projects, the Diesel plant proposal was met with opposition from Indonesia which feared competition with its domestic industry. The disagreement was eventually resolved when Indonesia and Singapore reached an export-limitation agreement in which Singapore would not export any engines to Indonesia unless requested. Nevertheless, this difference in views amongst member states increased anxiety on the Japanese side, whom demanded member states reach a mutual agreement if they want funds to be extended.

The Japanese were further concerned with the capability of recipient nation's infrastructure. The members of ASEAN were much behind in technological development, causing Japanese diplomats to be worried about the feasibility of advanced technical projects in the region. Furthermore, Japan was cautious of ASEAN members’ order of priority, often worrying that ASEAN members were not highly appreciative of the proposed Japanese-funded industrial projects.

The STABEX (export stabilization) fund proposal also faced complications on the Japanese side. Despite continuous reassertion of a desire for a STABEX system, Japan had so far only agree on a joint-examination of the possibility of establishing such a fund. The problem with STABEX is its defiance to the previously agreed GATT and its high political sensitivity. Internationally, ASEAN is pressuring Japan to open up its import markets while the Western counterpart requests it to decrease exports. Domestically, the Liberal Democratic Party’s electoral votes were highly dependent on the business and agricultural sectors, both of which are hostile to STABEX for reasons of competition.

== Significance of the Doctrine ==
=== Developments on the Southeast Asian Relations ===
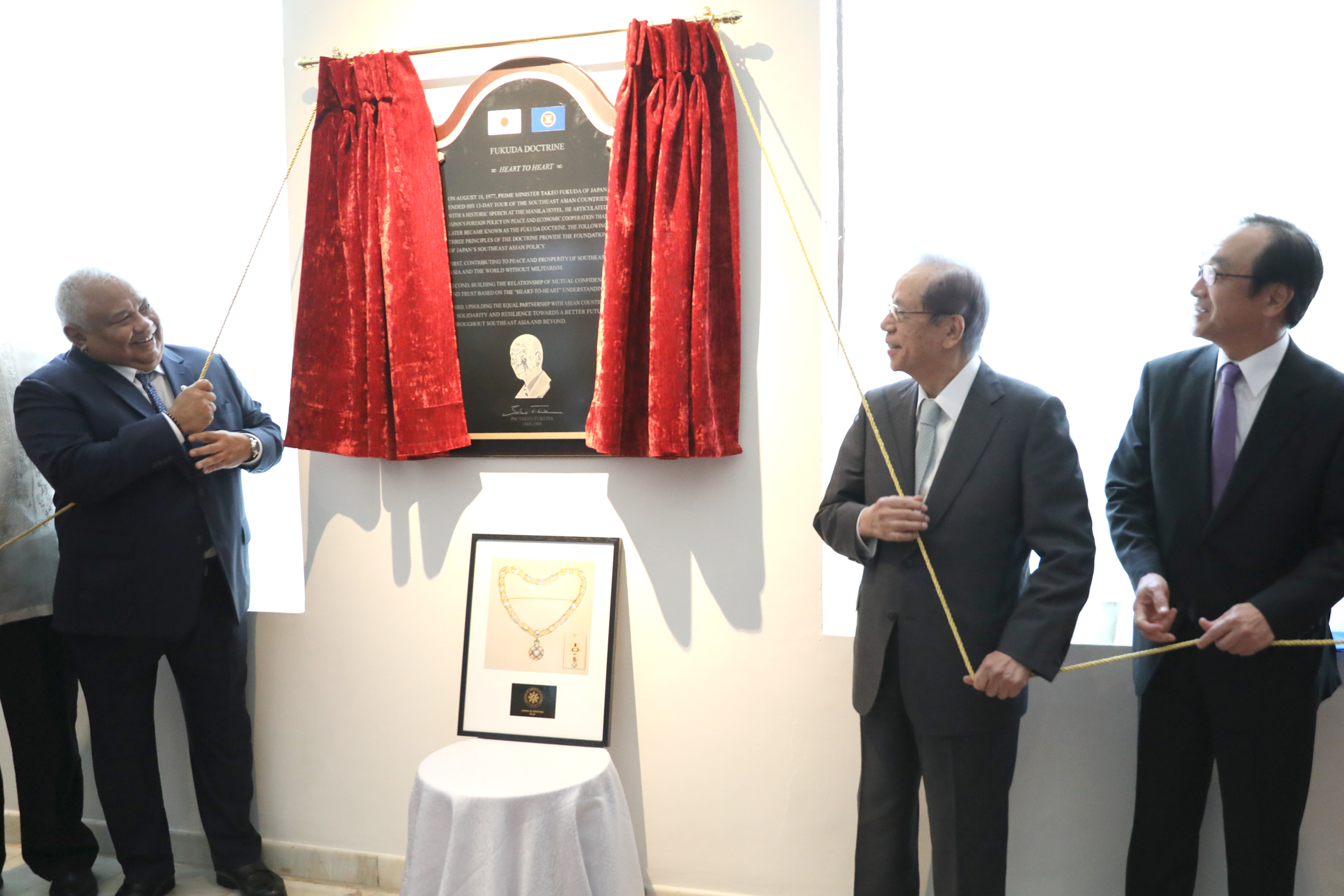
The unveiling of a marker commemorating the conception of the Fukuda Doctrine at the Manila Hotel in the Philippines on 1 October 2018.

The Japan-Southeast Asia friend and foe relationship can be characterized by material interests and historical antagonism caused by Japan’s imperialistic past. However, overall, there was an enhancement of the relations.

A significant incident was the increase of Southeast Asia’s anxiety in the 1970s when Japan expanded its economic practices and raised exports of synthetic rubber. The Tokyo government eased the tension by accepting ASEAN demands and limiting its production of synthetic rubber, attending ASEAN Post Ministerial Meeting (PMC), and becoming a dialog partner.

The enhancement of the Japan-Southeast Asia relations was not only a result of Japan’s reassurance efforts, but also a result of two significant fears brought about by the change in the strategic landscape of the region. One is the emergence of a power vacuum caused by the U.S. withdrawal from the region and the shift of the structure of rivalry from U.S. versus the Soviet Union and China to the Soviet Union versus China and U.S. The other is Japan’s rising influence in the region at the time. Japan was undergoing a rapid economic development, reviving material power and geostrategic resources such as Okinawa. In this situation, the Fukuda Doctrine reassured that despite the power vacuum, Japan would not dominate the region.

Japan's consistent adherence to the Doctrine contributed to the longevity of the positive relations. Japan participated in the peacebuilding missions in Southeast Asia since the 1990s. The emphasis was put on “human security” during the 1997 Asian financial crisis, during which Japan supported social stability through economic assistance. Furthermore, Japan has also been supporting ASEAN’s community-building efforts since the early 2000s, in an attempt to strengthen its political-security and to form economic and socio-cultural communities. The Fukuda Doctrine, as Kei Koga, a researcher of the Center for Strategic and International Studies writes in his report, Transcending the Fukuda Doctrine, “has been instrumental in defining Japan’s approach toward ASEAN’s efforts to integrate politically.”

Koga further argues that the current Japan-Southeast Asian relations have developed beyond socio-cultural, economic, to include political and security dimensions, and at a point where they can help shape and direct the region. Further progress is essential, considering the rise of China and the uncertainty over US-Southeast Asia policy under President Donald Trump.

=== International and Domestic Reactions ===
==== International Reactions ====
The reactions of ASEAN countries shifted from being cautious but optimistic in August, to openly hostile at the end of 1977. If the promises could be fulfilled, the Doctrine was welcomed. In fact, The ASEAN members, regretting America's withdrawal, initially encouraged Japan to play a bigger role as long as Japan doesn't become a military threat. Nonetheless, the feeling of suspicion that Japan would not fulfill the promise of the doctrine was prevalent among these countries due to Japan's past of not delivering its promises. Additionally, the fact that Japanese visible trade surplus for July was as much as US$2.05 billion added to the extant feeling of suspicion. The reaction gradually turned inimical, which could be perceived to be Japanese ‘foot dragging’. There was caution, for example on Japanese credibility, with no aid to ASEAN being made.

China's reaction, on the other hand, was more complex. It supported Japan's effort for a larger influence, in that Japan was strengthening its defensive power in the region. This was due to China's intention to minimize the influence of the Soviet Union, which was identified as China's primary enemy. However, simultaneously, it was not delighted to see a U.S. ally exercising influence on Southeast Asia.

The United States's response was positive. Present American policy in Southeast Asia take root in July 1973 with the announcement of the Nixon Doctrine. As a consequence of this doctrine, America pulled its land forces out of Asia. Following the Nixon doctrine, America espoused another major set of beliefs. The Ford Doctrine, announced in 1975, called for the normalization of relations with China. These elements, along with the collapse of the three Indochinese countries to communism, shaped American policy towards ASEAN countries, with the key determination being the protection of the non-communist countries while maintaining good relations with China and withdrawing from the region. Thus, America, as well as China, was supportive of Japan's new advance in the region.

The reaction of Vietnam, the most powerful Indochinese communist state, changed before and a while after the Fukuda visit. Its attitude went from being hostile to a more benign one. At first, Vietnam viewed Japan as a supporter of capitalist interest due to Japan-U.S. alliance and ASEAN as a hostile military alliance.

However, the growing hostility resulting from a war with Kampuchea in 1978, and the need for outside funding for its ambitious five-year economic development plan left Vietnam little choice but to seek for financial support from Japan. Despite Japanese conditionality, the full repayment of outstanding debts of South Vietnam's, Fukuda made an extraordinary statement that moved the stalled negotiations forward, which received a positive reaction from Vietnam.

Overall, the Doctrine was perceived as a promise of a strengthening of political and economic bonds, however, over time, the reversal of the trend could be depicted. This reversal was due to the fear that Japan would be less focused on ASEAN. Japan's external and internal policies in the last quarter of 1978, was affected by the development of Sino-Japanese relations, the change of leadership from pro-ASEAN leader Fukuda to pro-China leader Ohira, the competition for the “China market” among OECD countries, the uncertainty in the Southeast Asia region with the influx of refugees into ASEAN from the conflicts in Indochina.

==== Domestic Reactions ====
Domestic views of the government's new policy towards ASEAN were diverse. Views of press, the bureaucracy, the business community and opposition (political) parties were different, but essential.

The press, in spite of being criticized for sympathizing with the Liberal Democratic Party, exercised great influence over national consensus on Japan's new role in Southeast Asia. Journal articles published during and after the visit predominantly argued in favor of the Fukuda doctrine. If any criticism were visible, it would only be in the area concerning the articulation of the doctrine. The press demanded that the doctrine does better to change Japan's narrow attitude towards foreign nations and improving its cultural ties with other countries, particularly Southeast Asia, as well as refining the educational system to one that puts greater emphasis on foreign languages.

Likewise, the bureaucracy regarded the visit as an invariable success, and that it proved the Prime Minister's ability to convince his hosts “to open a new page in Asia’s history.” Despite the Ministry of Finance resistance to cultural fund, the bureaucracy nevertheless wholly agreed to endorse the doctrine.

The reaction of the business community, in contrast, was to some degree intricate. Amongst positive reactions to the Overseas Trade Development Association Foundation of Japan's revision, there was a growing fear that the unbridled assistance to Southeast Asian industrialization may ineluctably drive Japanese manufacturers out of the ASEAN market. Regardless, those supporting of the doctrine argued against such thought by interpreting industrialization as the increase in standard of living which could subsequently engender higher income and more demand for Japanese products.

Opposition parties, on the other hand, found themselves with no saying in the materialization of the doctrine. The Social Democratic Party (JSP) and Japanese Communist Party (JCP) meekly argued that the doctrine was merely a reassertion of Japan's subservience to the United States in another form. In particular, the JCP disproved aid to puppet governments, deploring that it was no different from America's aid to ineptitude government of Saigon, Phnom Penh and Vientiane. The two parties, however, never really found support for their statements.

The reaction of the people in Japan, by the end of 1997, was comparably hostile, and Fukuda's popularity was declining. This was due to the well-known fact of American displeasure with the Japanese economy, and the feeling of unrest in Japan as the unemployment rate was not improving.

=== Relevance of the Doctrine Today ===
==== Significance to Trust ====
The Fukuda Doctrine has received considerable attention over the years in Japan and Southeast Asia. The articulation and the implementation of the Doctrine improved Japan's image. The Doctrine itself became “a symbol of amity and cooperation between Japan and Southeast Asia.” According to the opinion polls in seven ASEAN countries (Indonesia, Malaysia, Myanmar, the Philippines, Singapore, Thailand, and Vietnam) in 2014, the majority of the public believed that their state-to-state relationship with Japan was friendly and dependable.

==== Significance to Policy Making ====
The Doctrine continues to be significant for Japan's policy towards Southeast Asia relations in the post-Cold War era. The doctrine served as “the blueprint of Japan’s foreign policy towards Southeast Asia", and established new norms with its three principles. The Fukuda Doctrine survived the Cold War, unlike the Brezhnev Doctrine, or the Nixon Doctrine that disappeared under it. Rather, it strengthened the discourse about the Japan-Southeast Asian relations into the 21st century. Thus, there is an expectation that it'll evolve and remain relevant.

==== References to the Doctrine ====
References to the Doctrine are still being made. The son of Fukuda Takeo, Fukuda Yasuo, made a reference to it when he became Prime Minister in 2007. Although he did not update the Doctrine as anticipated, he declared that ASEAN and Japan would be ”partners thinking together, acting together and sharing a future vision.”

This was later highlighted in ASEAN Chairman's Statement on the ASEAN Post Ministerial Conferences (PMC) + 1 Sessions in Singapore in 2008. It read; “The Meeting welcomed the “New Fukuda Doctrine,” in which Prime Minister of Japan Yasuo Fukuda declared that ASEAN and Japan would be partners thinking together, acting together and sharing a future vision.” Other than diplomats, journalists and scholars also made reference to the Doctrine in major conferences held in Japan and Southeast Asia in 2007, to mark the 30th anniversary for the doctrine.

==== Relevance to Africa ====
According to Tadokoro Masayuki’s argument in 2010, the principles of the Doctrine are relevant not only for Southeast Asia, but also for Africa today. He argues that “given the amicable relations that have developed between Japanese and the people in ASEAN countries since then, we should not be too cynical about the roles played by such political initiatives,” and that “For Japan, Africa represents neither an object of pity nor a security threat nor a mere supplier of natural resources nor a giant zoo, but rather a partner with whom Japanese should be willing to work together.”

=== Deficiency of the Fukuda Doctrine ===
However, the principles of the Doctrine are considered not enough to articulate the current relationship and to enhance it. In the post-Cold War era, ASEAN has expanded its functions to include strengthening the security for regional peace and stability. ASEAN's importance has increased due to the strategic uncertainty by the power shift to China. Japan has advanced “de facto regional integration” with ASEAN through aid, trade, investment and cultural exchanges. ASEAN, as a result, has gained the dominant position in the region. Japan-Southeast Asia relations are now at a point where they can help shape and direct the region. Japan and ASEAN are both pursuing goals to better the issues of human rights, the rule of law, and other democratic principles. Kei Koga argues that there is an opportunity to enhance their political cooperation that transcends the Fukuda Doctrine, in pursuing these shared goals.

== See also ==
- Yoshida Doctrine
- Foreign policy doctrine
- Foreign policy of Japan
- International economic cooperation policy of Japan
- Official development assistance Japan
- ASEAN
- Five-Year Plans of Vietnam

== Literature ==
- Lam Peng Er, ed. (2013). Japan's Relations with Southeast Asia: The Fukuda Doctrine and Beyond. Routledge.
- Sueo Sudo. “Japan-ASEAN Relations: New Dimensions in Japanese Foreign Policy”, Asian Survey 28, no. 5 (1988): 509–25.
- Sueo Sudo (1992). The Fukuda Doctrine and ASEAN: new dimensions in Japanese foreign policy. Singapore: Institute of Southeast Asian Studies.
- Mendi Wolf (2001). Japan and South East Asia. Vol.2, The Cold War era 1947-1989 and issues at the end of the Twentieth century. London: Routledge.
- Akihiko, Tanaka. ""The World and Japan" Database (". Database of Japanese Politics and International Relations. National Graduate Institute for Policy Studies (GRIPS); Institute for Advanced Studies on Asia (IASA), The University of Tokyo.
