= Defence policy of Japan =

The Government of Japan has implemented a series of measures to enhance its security policy. These include the establishment of the National Security Council (NSC), the adoption of the National Security Strategy (NSS), and the formulation of National Defense Program Guidelines (NDPG).

These efforts were predicated on the belief that Japan needs to contribute more actively to the peace and stability of Asia and the international community while coordinating with other allied nations.

Since the mid-2020s, the rhetoric surrounding the defense policy has become much more militant, with discussions of re-evaluating the country's pacifist constitution specifically regarding threats allegedly posed by China and North Korea.

== National Security Council (NSC) ==
On December 4, 2013, the National Security Council was established to serve as a forum for discussion on national security issues. Chaired by Japan's Prime Minister, the NSC was created to facilitate high-level consultations on critical matters affecting Japan's security.

== National Security Strategy (NSS) ==
On December 17, 2013, National Security Strategy was adopted through a Cabinet decision. The NSS outlines the fundamental direction of Japan’s diplomatic and defence policies concerning national security. It emphasizes the principle of "Proactive Contribution to Peace" and seeks to enhance understanding of Japan’s national security objectives.

On April 1, 2024, 16 civilian airports and seaports were designated for use by the Self-Defence Forces (SDF) and Japan Coast Guard, with part of the national budget reserved for improving the peacetime use of these facilities. These changes aim to bolster military readiness in response to global developments such as Russia's invasion of Ukraine and potential contingencies involving Taiwan.

== Budget ==
In 1976, Prime Minister Miki Takeo announced defense spending should not exceed 1% of Japan's gross domestic product (GDP), a ceiling that was observed until 1986.

As of 2005, Japan's military budget was maintained at about 3% of the national budget. About half of the military budget is spent on personnel costs, while the rest is reserved for weapons programs, maintenance, and operating costs. As of 2023, Japan has the tenth largest defense budget in the world. The defense budget for the fiscal year of 2025 is ¥8.705 trillion, an increase of 9.7% from the previous year.

== See also ==
- Article 9 of the Japanese Constitution
- Ministry of Defense (Japan)
- 2015 Japanese military legislation
