= Yoshida Doctrine =

Economic strategy adopted in Japan after World War II

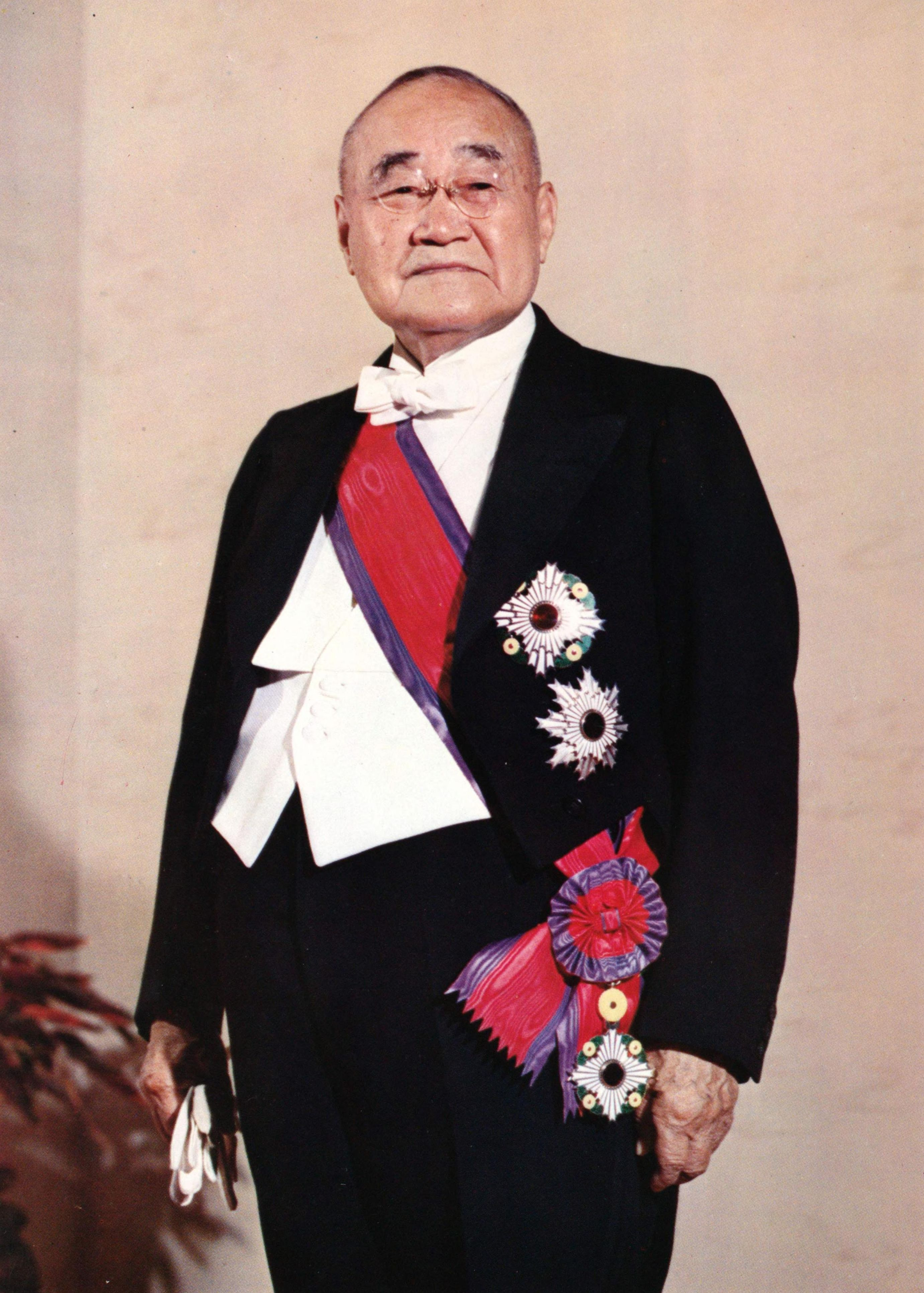
Prime Minister Shigeru Yoshida, from whom the doctrine takes its name

The Yoshida Doctrine was a strategy adopted by Japan after its defeat in 1945 under Prime Minister Shigeru Yoshida, the prime minister from 1948–1954. He concentrated upon reconstructing Japan's domestic economy while relying heavily on the security alliance with the United States. The Yoshida Doctrine emerged in 1951 and it shaped Japanese foreign policy into the 21st century. First, Japan is firmly allied with the United States in the Cold War against Communism. Second, Japan relies on American military strength and limits its own defense forces to a minimum. Third, Japan emphasizes economic diplomacy in its world affairs. The economic dimension was fostered by Hayato Ikeda who served as Yoshida's finance minister and later was prime minister. The Yoshida doctrine was accepted by the United States. Most historians argue the policy was wise and successful, but a minority criticize it as naïve and inappropriate. Furthermore, the term "Yoshida Doctrine" was coined decades after Yoshida had stepped down, and some critics question whether it deserves to be described as a doctrine at all.

== Historical background ==
Even after its surrender in World War II, the Japanese government continued to function. It held its first post-war election in the spring of 1946. This election was also the first time women were allowed to vote in Japan. Yoshida Shigeru emerged as the winner of the election, becoming prime minister. Around the same time, discontent grew over the previous Meiji Constitution, and a desire for an entirely new constitution grew. A small team from a section of SCAP helped draft a new constitution. After some revisions, the Japanese Diet approved this new Constitution in November 1946, it took effect in May 1947, and it continues on today. One important aspect of the Constitution was Article 9 which stated that "the Japanese people forever renounce war as a sovereign right of the nation" and that military forces "will never be maintained". Article 9 played a large role in the development of Yoshida's policy.

== Core elements ==
=== Reliance on the United States ===
The Yoshida doctrine and Japan's foreign policy of the time, emphasized mutual relations with the United States. Japan relied on the United States’ military for security, because of Article 9 of the Japanese Constitution, being denied the right to war-making potential. Repeated attempts by the United States, in following years, to get Japan to increase its military expenditure were rejected by Prime Minister Yoshida on the basis of Japan's pacifist post-war constitution. Military was not the only thing Japan relied on the United States for. During the Cold War, Japan's largest trading partner was the United States. Exports to the United States at the time played a large role in Japan's economic development.

=== Economic emphasis ===
Prime Minister Yoshida's aim was to focus all available means on an economic recovery. Given the lack of military power, Japanese foreign policy naturally placed emphasis on economic policy. Yoshida envisioned a speedy economic recovery through which Japan would be able to once again become a major world power (at which point Japan would be in a position to rearm). His policy was thus not rooted in pacifism but was in line with the realist foreign policy that's been a dominating force in Japan's approach to international relations since the Meiji Restoration. Yoshida and finance minister Hayato Ikeda took leadership roles as Japan began to rebuild its industrial infrastructure and placed a premium on unrestrained economic growth. Many of these concepts still impact Japan's political and economic policies.

== See also ==
- Foreign policy doctrine
- Fukuda Doctrine
- Treaty of Mutual Cooperation and Security between the United States and Japan
