= Shrewsbury School =

Public school in Shrewsbury, England

Shrewsbury School Libera Scola Grammaticalis Regis Edvardi Sexti King Edward VI School at Shrewsbury
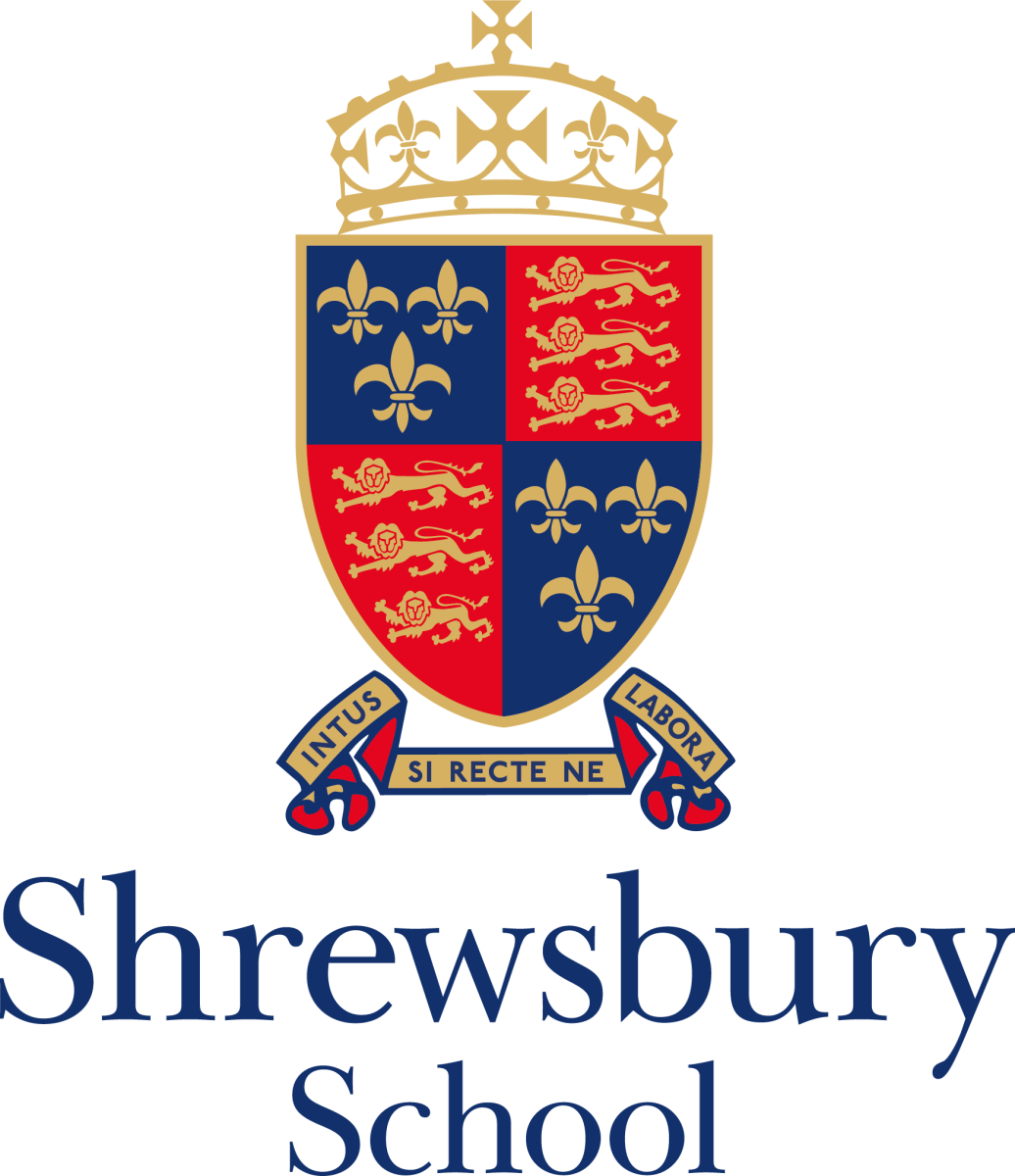

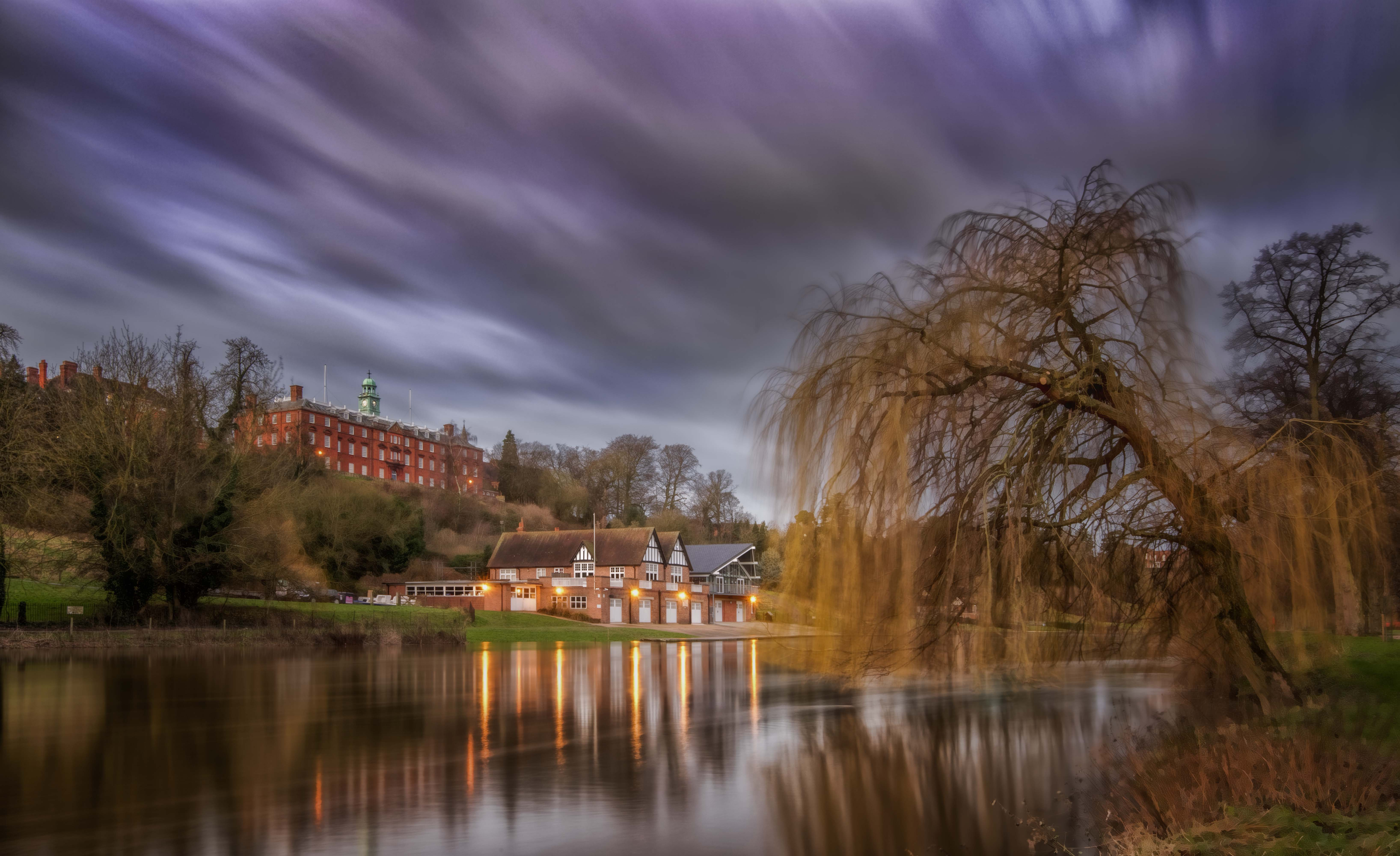

Location
- Kingsland; Shrewsbury, Shropshire, SY3 7BA; England; 52.7038°N 2.7622°W

Information
- Type: Public school Private boarding school
- Motto: Latin: Intus Si Recte Ne Labora (If Right Within, Trouble Not)
- Religious affiliation: Church of England
- Established: 1552; 474 years ago
- Founder: King Edward VI
- Local authority: Shropshire Council
- Department for Education URN: 123608 Tables
- Chair of Governing Body: James Pitt
- Headmaster: Leo Winkley
- Staff: ca. 120
- Gender: Co-educational (from 2015)
- Age: 13 to 18
- Enrolment: ca. 840
- Student to teacher ratio: 8:1
- Campus size: 110-acre (45 ha)
- Campus type: Semi-rural
- Houses: 12
- Colours: Royal Blue and White
- Publication: The Salopian
- Budget: £38,511,745 (2024)
- Revenue: £39,278,914 (2024)
- Affiliations: G30 Schools; HMC; The Rugby Group
- Alumni: Old Salopians
- School Song: Carmen Salopiense
- Website: www.shrewsbury.org.uk

Shrewsbury School is a public school (English private boarding and day school) for pupils aged 13–18, located in the town of Shrewsbury, Shropshire, England.

It was founded in 1552 by Edward VI by royal charter, to replace the town's Anglo-Saxon collegiate foundations which were disestablished in the sixteenth century. It is one of the seven public schools in the UK subject to the Public Schools Act 1868 and one of the nine schools reviewed by the Clarendon Commission between 1861 and 1864. The school is notable for being the education site of renowned scientist Charles Darwin.

It was originally founded as a boarding school for boys. In 2008, however, girls were accepted in the sixth form. Since 2015 Shrewsbury School has been a co-educational school. As at Michaelmas Term 2023, Shrewsbury School had 842 pupils: 522 boys and 320 girls. The school has seven boys', and five girls' houses. Alumni of the school are known as Old Salopians.

The present school site, to which the school moved in 1882, is on the south bank of the River Severn.

== History ==
=== Circumstances of the foundation ===
Since Saxon times the Collegiate Churches of

- St Chad (traditionally founded in Shrewsbury when it was known as Pengwern, either by the royal family of the Kingdom of Powys in the 6th century, or by Offa, king of Mercia in the 8th century);
- St Mary (established by King Edgar in the 10th century); and
- St Alkmund (founded by Queen Æthelflæd before 918AD; endowed as a college by 975 by King Edgar, though reduced in the mid 12th century)

were providing education in the town, complemented by the foundation of Shrewsbury Abbey in the 11th century.

These were broken up by the Reformation, although there is a mention of a grammar school at Shrewsbury in a court case of 1439.

Shrewsbury School was founded in response to those interruptions to the town's ancient traditions in education in the sixteenth century: the disruption caused significant local ill feeling, and by 1542, townspeople were beginning to petition Henry VIII for remedy. They devised a scheme hoping to use the proceeds from the dissolution of Shrewsbury Abbey for a renewed provision of education. They were not immediately successful.

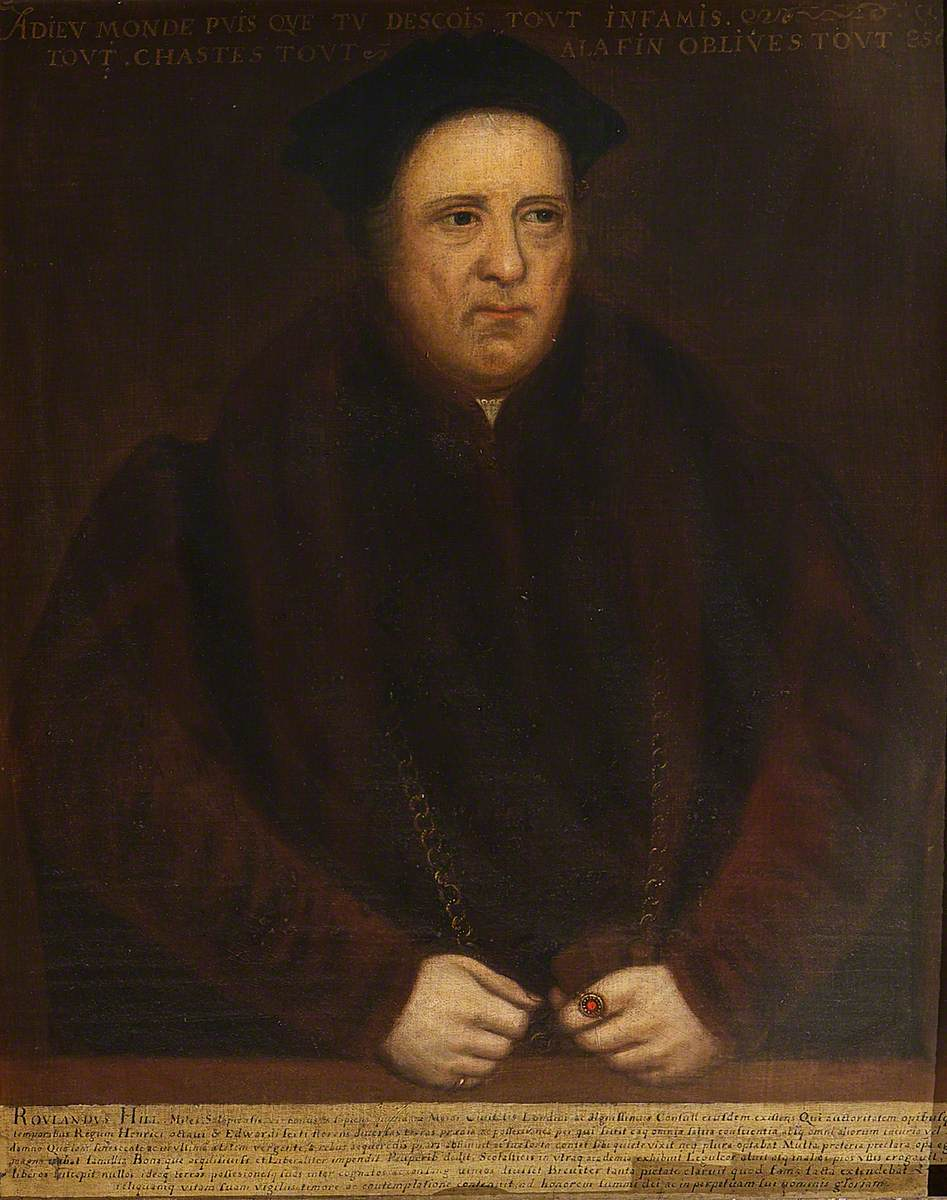
Sir Rowland Hill

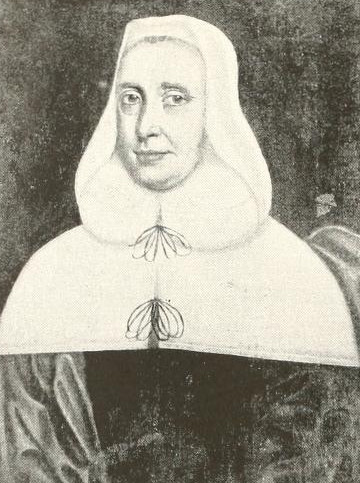
Reginald Corbet

Two of the statesmen involved in the petitions to the Crown to re-establish the ancient traditions of education in Shrewsbury represented by terminating the Saxon collegiate foundations in the town

The statesman Sir Rowland Hill had the grant of certain of the abbey's holdings and was involved in the founding petitions. Also involved in the founding petitions was Reginald Corbet (who married Hill's heiress, Alice Gratewood), a justice of the peace for Shropshire and commissioner for chantries in the county, who was paid ten shillings in 1548 "for a supplication exhibited to the Lord Chancellor to obtain a free school". Significantly, there was also a receipt for 20 pence to bribe the Lord Chancellor's servant to win his ear.

=== Foundation and early years ===
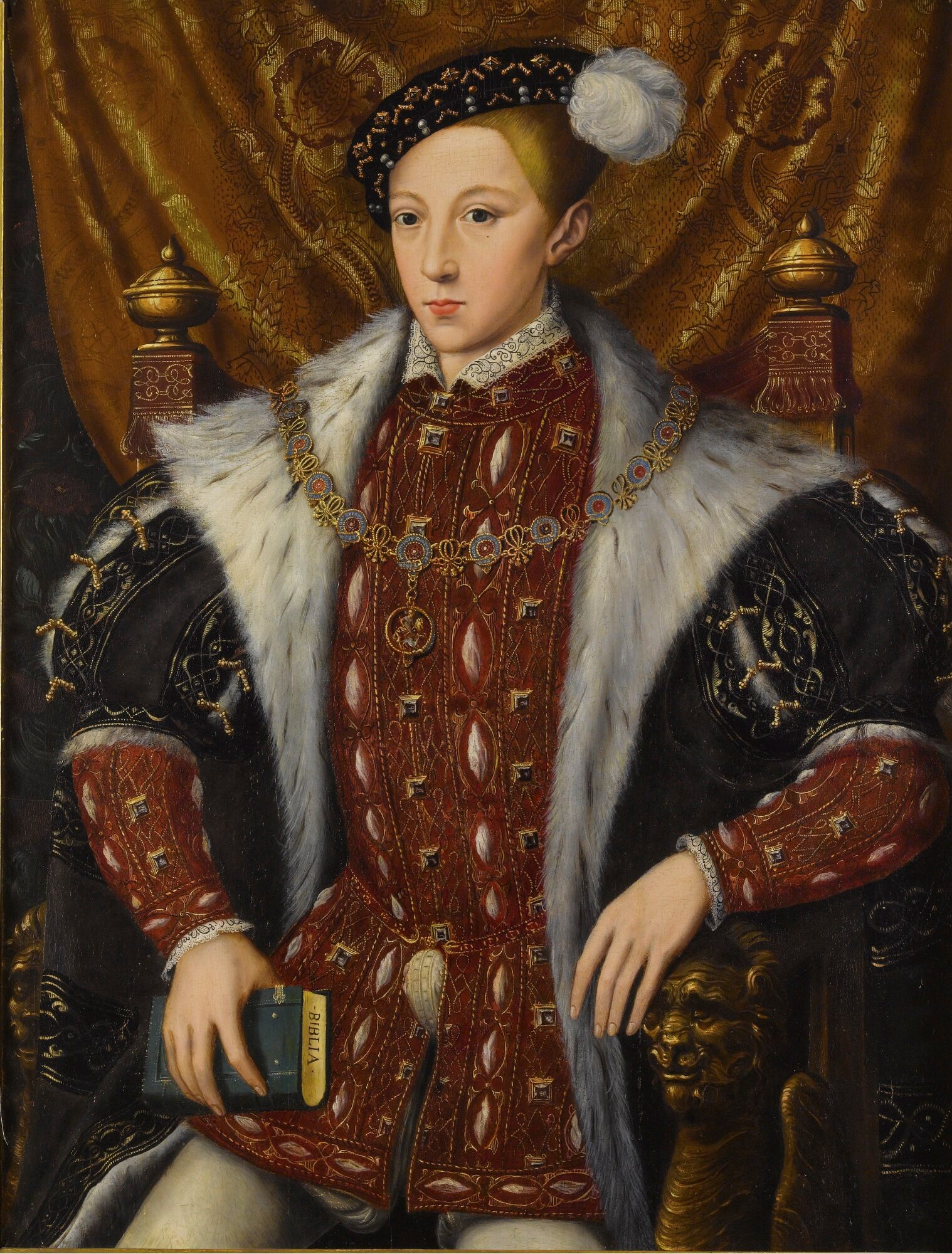
King Edward VI, the founder of Shrewsbury School, by the circle of William Scrots

Shrewsbury School was founded by charter granted by King Edward VI on 10 February 1552.

The school began operation in a house and land purchased from John Proude in 1551, together with three rented half-timbered buildings, which included Riggs Hall, built in 1450. These are now the only remaining part of the original buildings occupied by the institution. Archaeological excavations of the sites of these first buildings in 1978 revealed finds going back to the Saxon period, along with relics of the school, now in the town collections.

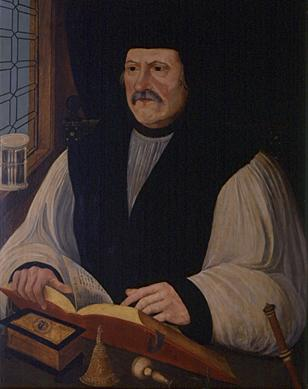
Matthew Parker granted a special license to send Shrewsbury's foundational headmaster Thomas Ashton to the town; later Elizabeth I would direct Ashton to write the ordinances.

The early curriculum was based on Continental Calvinism under its foundational headmaster, Thomas Ashton (appointed 1562). Prior to his appointment a special license had been obtained from Mathew Parker, Elizabeth I's first Archbishop of Canterbury, on the grounds that Ashton not being available would damage the progress of the school's foundation. Ashton was a contemporary of Roger Ascham at St John's, Cambridge: Ascham was a writer on theories of education and served in the administrations of Edward VI, Mary I, and Elizabeth I, having earlier acted as Elizabeth's tutor in Greek and Latin between 1548 and 1550.

Early pupils were taught the catechism of Calvin. The school attracted large numbers of pupils from Protestant families in Shropshire, North Wales and beyond, with 266 boys on its roll at the end of 1562.

Early pupils lodged with local families. For example, Sir Philip Sidney (who had a well-known correspondence with his father about his schooling) lodged in the castle ward with George Leigh, who had been Member of Parliament for Shrewsbury. In this period Elizabeth I's favourite Robert Dudley, 1st Earl of Leicester also visited the school to see his nephew Thomas Sidney and attended a service at St Mary's Church.

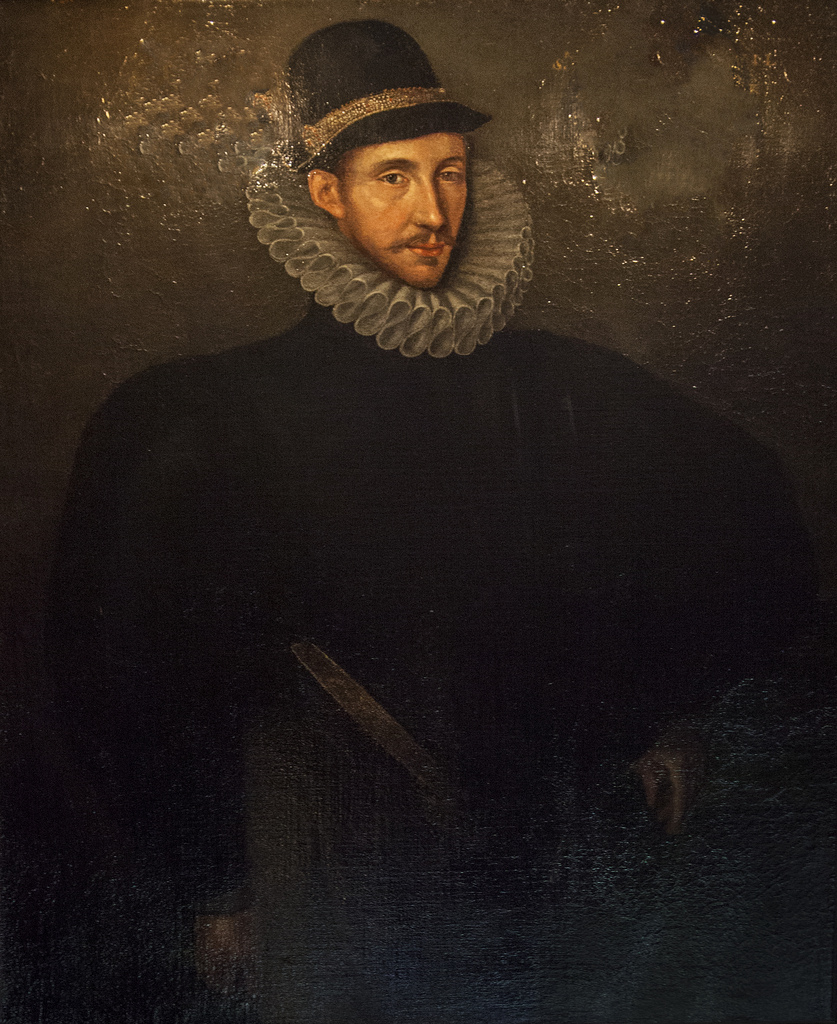
Fulke Greville was an early pupil of the school.

Sidney attended the school along with his lifelong friend Fulke Greville (later Lord Brooke), The literary output of these school-day associations became significant: in 1579 Francis Bacon joined their circle, which also included Mary Sidney (Philip's sister, by then Countess of Pembroke).

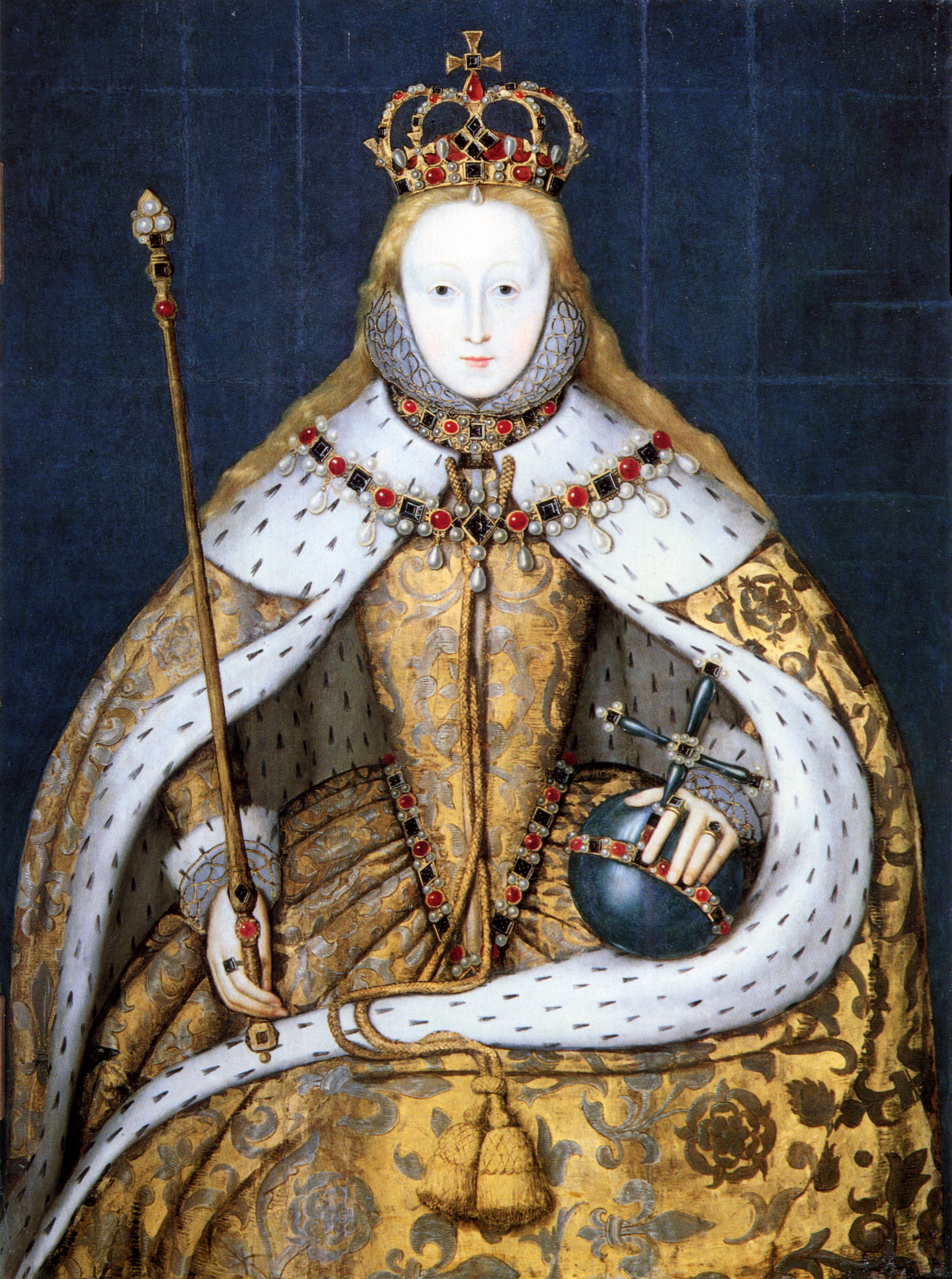
Shrewsbury School was augmented by Queen Elizabeth I in 1571.

Ashton resigned his headmastership in 1568. From 1571, Ashton was in the service of Walter Devereux, 1st Earl of Essex, was involved in the education of his son the 2nd Earl, and was employed in confidential communications with Queen Elizabeth I and the Privy Council.

Having achieved a reputation for excellence under Ashton, in 1571 the school was augmented by Elizabeth I. By 1581, the school had 360 pupils, and it was described by William Camden in 1582 as "the best filled [school] in all England"; the population of the town grew by about 5% when the boarders returned during term time during this period. In 1585 the schoolboys stood in battle array with bows and arrows by the castle gates when the Earl of Essex entered the town.

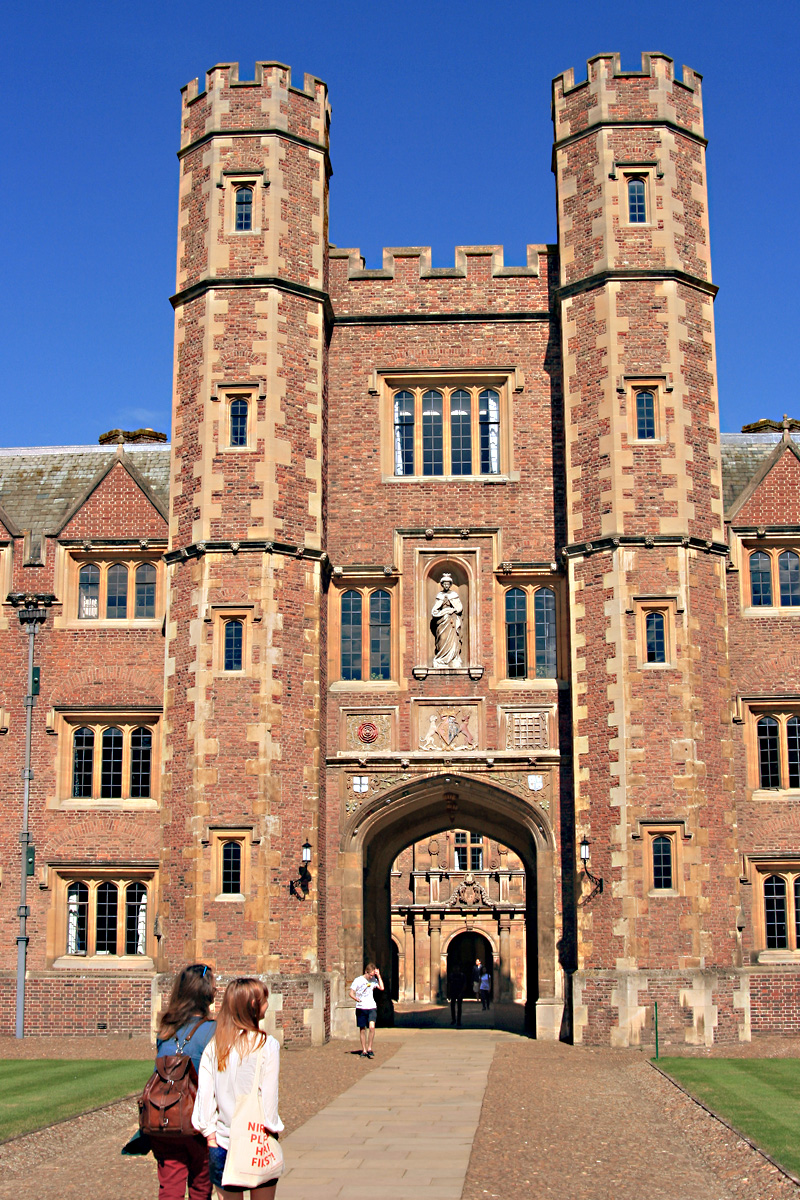
There are links between the school and St John's College, Cambridge going back to Tudor times.

In 1578 Ashton returned to Shrewsbury, where he had been ordered by an indenture of Elizabeth I to set out the ordinances governing the school, which were in force until 1798. Under these regulations, the borough bailiffs (mayors after 1638) had the power to appoint masters, with Ashton's old St John's College, Cambridge having an academic veto. Shrewsbury has retained links with the college, with the continued appointment of Johnian academics to the Governing Body, and the historic awarding of "closed" Shrewsbury Exhibitions.

Scholars from the school were from time to time employed by the local community to draw and witness bonds for illiterate tradesmen in this period; for instance Richard Langley (whose father, a prosperous tailor, had purchased the Shrewsbury Abbey site after the dissolution) could remember being asked by a cooper in 1556 to witness a bond "at what time he was a scholar in the free school of Shrewsbury" aged about fifteen.

=== 1600s ===
In 1608 the town and the school were in fierce dispute about who should be appointed second master. The headmaster, John Meighen, wished to promote the third master, Ralph Gittins; the town wished to appoint Simon Moston on the recommendation of St John's College, whose fellows had a say in the appointment of new masters. When the town's bailiffs came to install their preferred candidate on 31 August 1608, the building had already been occupied by about 60 women from the town (including three spinsters, two widows, the wives of mercers, tailors, weavers, butchers, shoemakers, tanners, glovers, carpenters and coopers) taking the headmaster's side and preferring Gittins on the basis that only the son of a burgess could serve as second master. Jamming the school benches against the doors, they barricaded themselves in the school until the following Saturday, passing a "great hammer" between themselves which had been used to gain entry to the school. The authorities sought to read the Statute on Rebellion, but the women made such a noise nobody could hear it. The incident provoked a mass of litigation in the courts of Chancery and Star Chamber in Westminster.

A house (today called Stone Grange) was built for the school in 1617 in the nearby village of Grinshill as a retreat in times of plague.

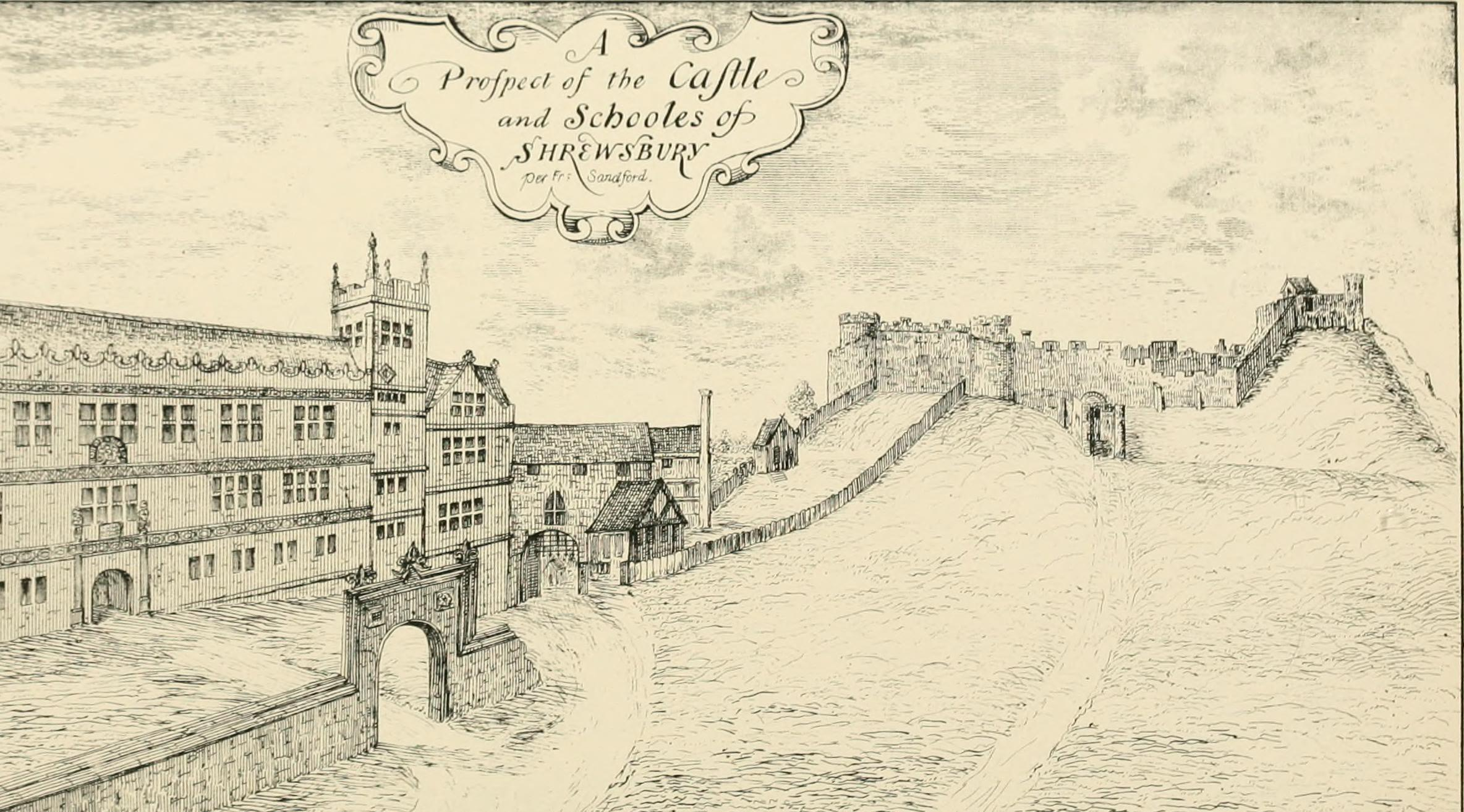
Historic prospect of the school with the castle, and the gate in the town walls

The stone buildings on Castle Gates, including a chapel, dormitories, library and classrooms, were completed by 1630, with Ashton's successor, John Meighen, founding a chained library in 1606, though the library had begun making acquisitions by 1596, with a terrestrial globe by the first English globe maker Emery Molineux being its first acquisition. The bookcases in the library (with the books chained to them) projected from the walls between the windows on both sides of the room forming alcoves for study: an arrangement that may still be seen in Duke Humphrey's Library in Oxford. The completion of this room was celebrated by the masters and Bailiffs on 1 October 1612 by taking cake and wine in the new space.

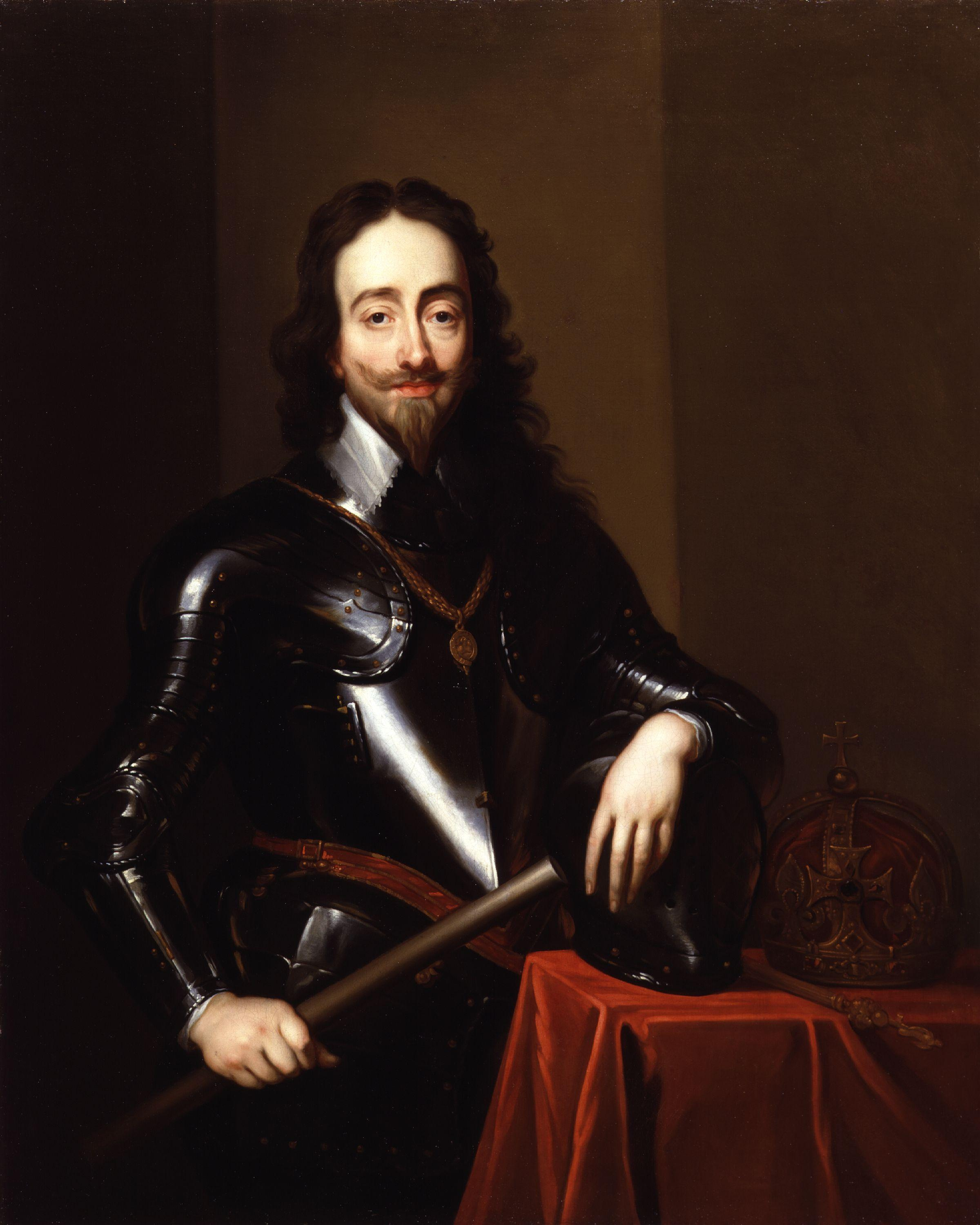
King Charles I occupied the school's buildings for a brief period in 1642 when his capital was at Shrewsbury during the Wars of the Three Kingdoms/English Civil War.

==== Civil War ====
Shrewsbury was occupied on behalf of the King during the Civil War, who briefly made the town his capital from September 1642. A council of war was appointed for the whole district, of which Lord Capel was president. This council held its meetings in the school library, and some of the school's books were damaged during this time.

Around September 1642 a contentious "Royal Loan" was made to Charles I of £600 (around 75% of the money in the school exchequer at the time); a further £47 was lent to the corporation of the town. The loan was acknowledged under seal by the king in the following terms:

Charles Rex

Trusty and well beloved we greet you well. Whereas ye have, out of your good affection to our present service and towards the supply of our extraordinary occasions, lent unto us the sum of £600, being a stock belonging to your school founded by our royal predecessor King Edward the Sixth, in this our Town of Shrewsbury. We do hereby promise that we shall cause the same to be truly repaid unto you whensoever ye shall demand the same, and shall always remember the loan of it as a very acceptable service unto us. Given under our Signet at our Court at Shrewsbury this nth of October, 1642.

To our trusty and well beloved Richard Gibbons, late Mayor of our Town of Shrewsbury, and Thomas Chaloner, Schoolmaster of our Free School there.

This was considered a misappropriation of the school's funds. This was litigated in the Court of Chancery and before the Lords Commissioners of the Great Seal by the corporation of the town after the end of the civil war. The record of the royal loan appeared in the school register at the time of the November audit of 1642, but was torn out by the time the matter was before the courts. The borrowed funds were never recovered.

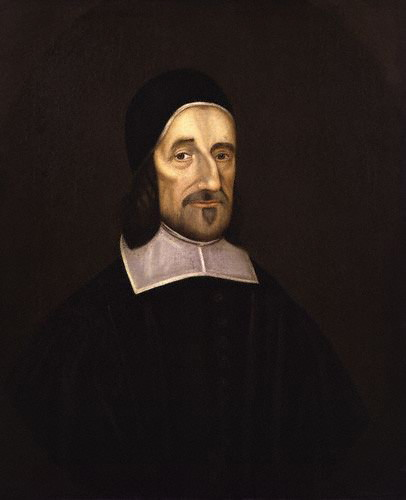
Richard Baxter led proposals to convert the school into a university during Oliver Cromwell's Commonwealth. This did not come into being, although university education did finally arrive in the town in 2014.

During the Commonwealth period following the execution of Charles I, Richard Baxter suggested the establishment of a university to serve Wales at Shrewsbury, using the school's premises, but due to lack of financial provision it came to nothing. Had that scheme come to fruition the town of Shrewsbury would have the third oldest university in England behind Oxford and Cambridge.

==== Restoration and 1700s ====
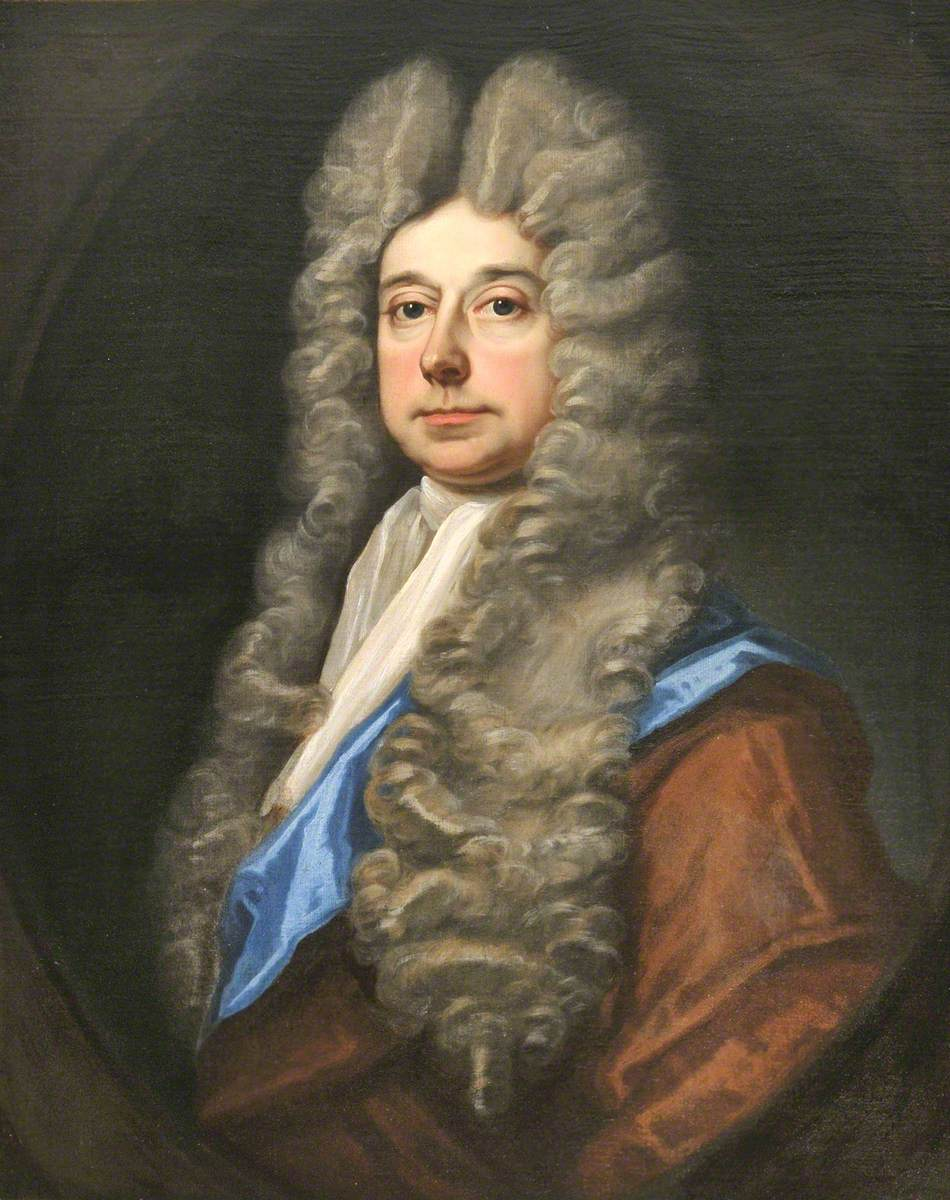
Richard Hill, "the Great Hill" tutor to the Boyle family was an old boy of the school.

The history of the school between 1664 and 1798 is not easily available, as the registers and papers between these periods have been lost for many years. Nevertheless, diplomat Richard Hill, Baron Digby Governor of King's County in Ireland, Robert Price, Justice of the Court of Common Pleas, poet and politician Arthur Maynwaring and Thomas Bowers, Bishop of Chichester, attended the school at this time.

Celia Fiennes visited the school in 1698 and recorded the school as follows: "Here are three free schooles together, built of free stone, 3 Large roomes to teach the Children, w^{th} severall masters. Y^{e} first has 150^{£} a year y^{e} second 100 y^{e} third 50^{£} a year and teach Children from reading English till fit for y^{e} University, and its free for Children not only of y^{e} town but for all over England if they Exceed not y^{e} numbers... ".

In the early eighteenth century, Daniel Defoe also visited the school, noting: "Here is a good Free-school, the most considerable in this Part of England; founded by King Edward VI and endowed by Queen Elizabeth, with a very sufficient Maintenance for a Chief or Headmaster, and three Under-masters or Ushers. The Buildings, which are of Stone, are very spacious, particularly the Library, which has a great many Books in it. The School-masters have also very handsome Houses to dwell in; for that the Whole has the Face of a College."

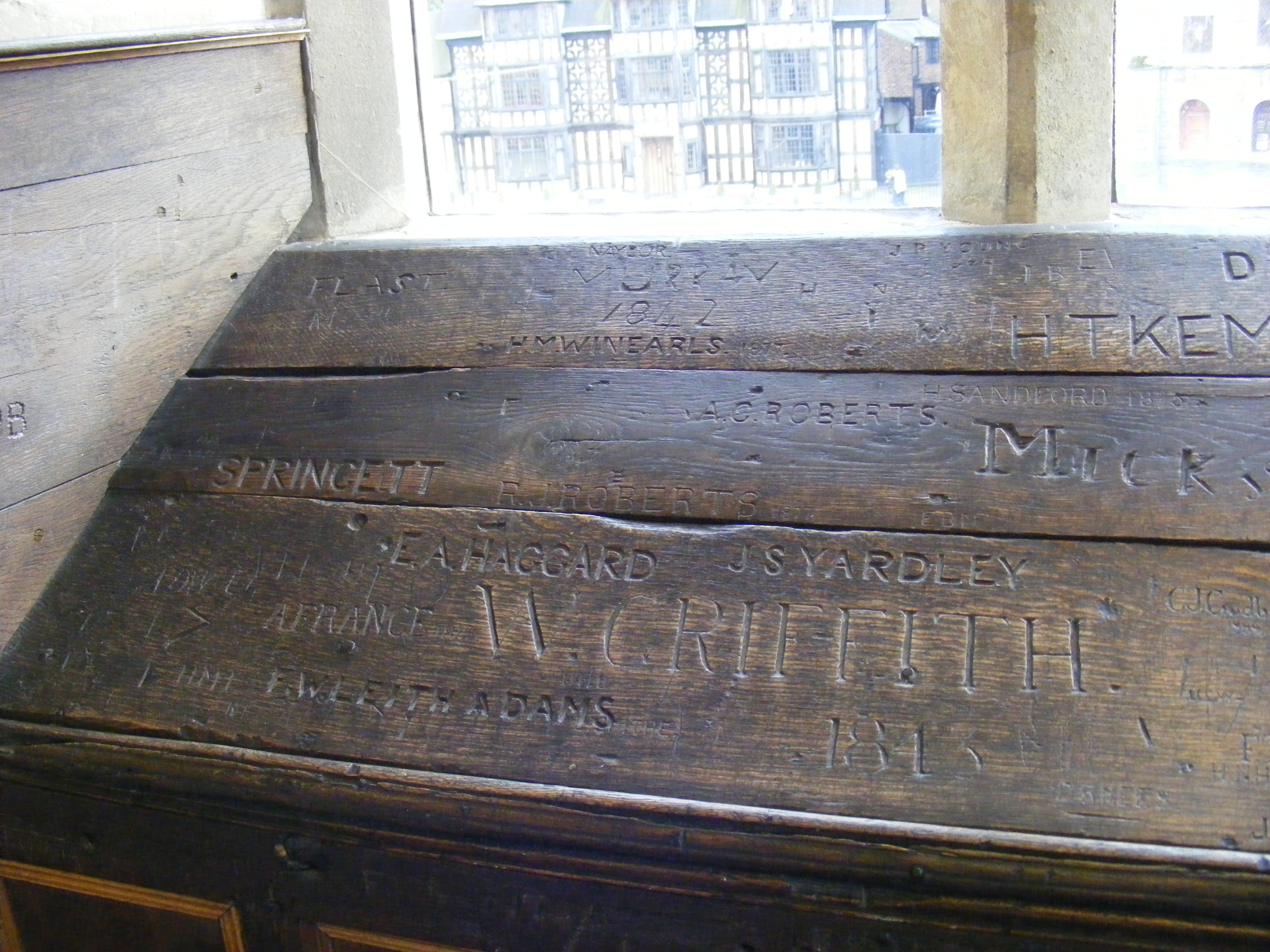
Early graffiti in the former school building

A wing was added to the buildings on the original site during the Georgian period, connected to Rigg's Hall and spanning the old town wall. Although this building was listed at grade two it was demolished around 100 years after the school had vacated the building when Shropshire County Council, who operated the buildings as a public library were engaged in major restorations works in the 1980s because the structure was by then unsound.

Shrewsbury Free Grammar School Act 1798
- Act of Parliament
- Parliament of Great Britain
- Long title: An act for the better government and regulation of the free grammar school of King Edward the Sixth, at Shrewsbury, in the county of Salop.
- Citation: 38 Geo. 3. c. lxviii
- Territorial extent: Great Britain

Dates
- Royal assent: 28 June 1798
- Commencement: 28 June 1798 (Note: The Acts of Parliament (Commencement) Act 1793.)

Status: Current legislation

Text of statute as originally enacted

In 1798, a specific act of Parliament, the Shrewsbury Free Grammar School Act 1798 (38 Geo. 3. c. lxviii), was passed for the better government of the school. The act contains an oath to be taken by the governors, and confirmed Lord Chancellor as visitor (as for all Royal foundations).

This statutory scheme was later amended by the Court of Chancery, in 1853.

=== 1800s ===
The school had just three headmasters during the 19th century.

Samuel Butler was appointed headmaster in 1798. Writing at this time he observed: "This school was once the Eton or the Westminster of Wales and all Shropshire", and under his leadership the school's reputation, which had receded from the Civil War, again grew. In 1839 an incident known as the "Boiled Beef Row" took place, where the boys walked out of the school in protest at the food, and the praepostors were all removed from office. In this period (1818–1825) Charles Darwin attended the school.

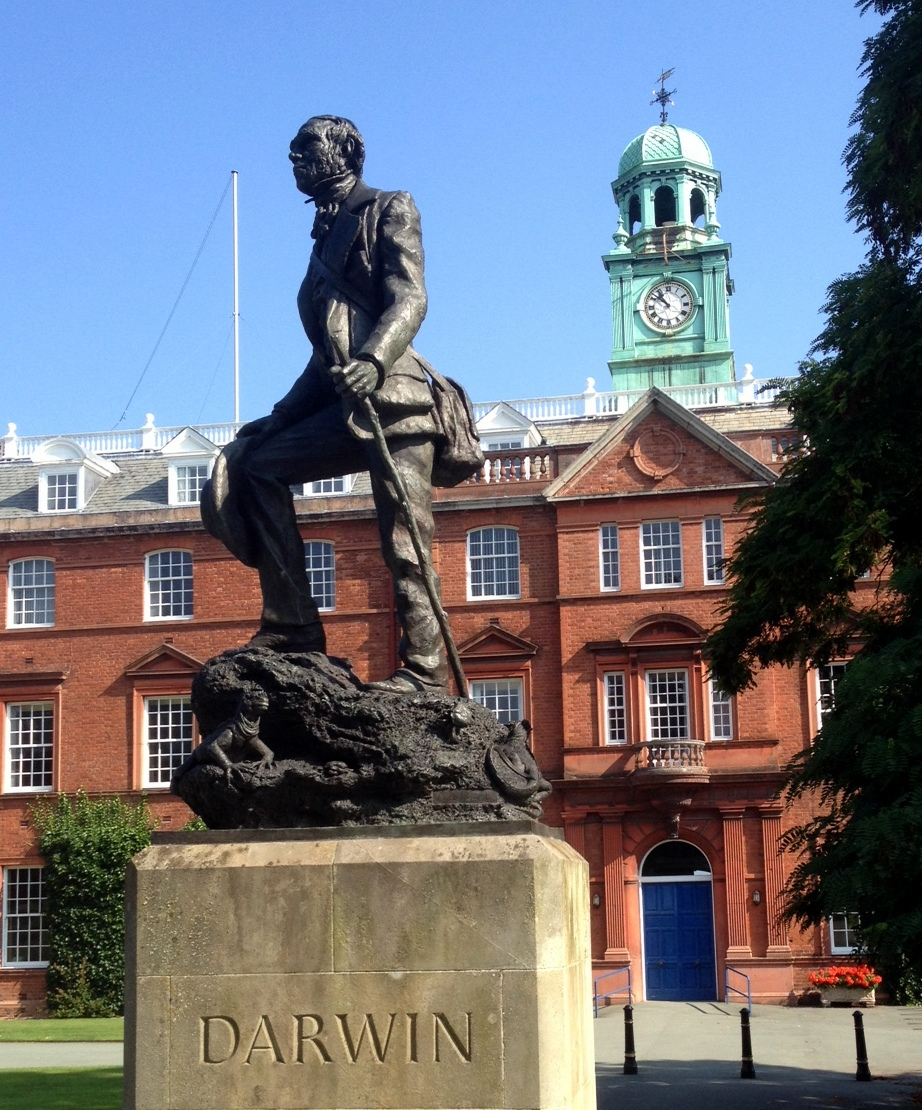
To mark the turn of the Millennium, Shrewsbury School erected a statue of Charles Darwin.

Butler was succeeded by his pupil Benjamin Hall Kennedy (of Latin Primer fame) in 1836, who in turn gave way to Henry Whitehead Moss in 1866.

The school's original Castle Gates premises had little in way of provision for games. Under Dr Butler, there were two fives courts and playgrounds in front of and behind the buildings, but after the arrival of Dr Kennedy football was permitted, for which the school acquired a ground in Coton Hill (north of Castle Gates).

Under Butler and Kennedy, Shrewsbury was one of three provincial schools among the nine studied by the Clarendon Commission of 1861–64 (the schools considered being Eton, Charterhouse, Harrow, Rugby, Westminster, and Winchester, and two day schools: St Paul's and Merchant Taylors). Shrewsbury went on to be included in the Public Schools Act 1868, which ultimately related only to the boarding schools.

The school continued in the 1600s buildings on its original site, until it was relocated in 1882, when Moss moved the school from its original town centre location to a new site of 150 acres (61 ha) in Kingsland (an area of land which at one time belonged to the Crown and granted to the Corporation at "a rather remote period, the exact date of which appears not to be known", but apparently before 1180), on the south bank of the River Severn overlooking the town. A legacy of this move can be seen in the school premises being referred to as "The Site".

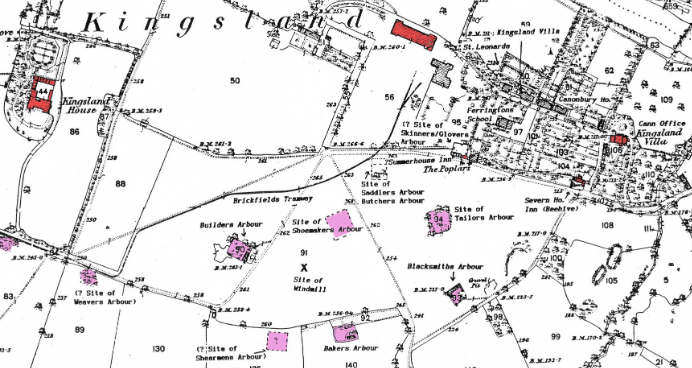
Known locations (on what is now the grounds of the school) of the guild arbours for the pageantry in the early modern period and before

In the later Renaissance, this land had been devoted to elaborate performances, with grand arbours being built by the guilds. Some of the arbours survive, such as that for the Shoemakers (now in the Quarry Park).

The school was relocated in the current Main School Building which dates from 1765 and had at different times housed a foundling hospital and the Shrewsbury workhouse, before translating to this current use. In order to meet this new purpose, it was remodelled by Sir Arthur Blomfield (whose other educational commissions include Marlborough College and Lady Margaret Hall, Oxford).

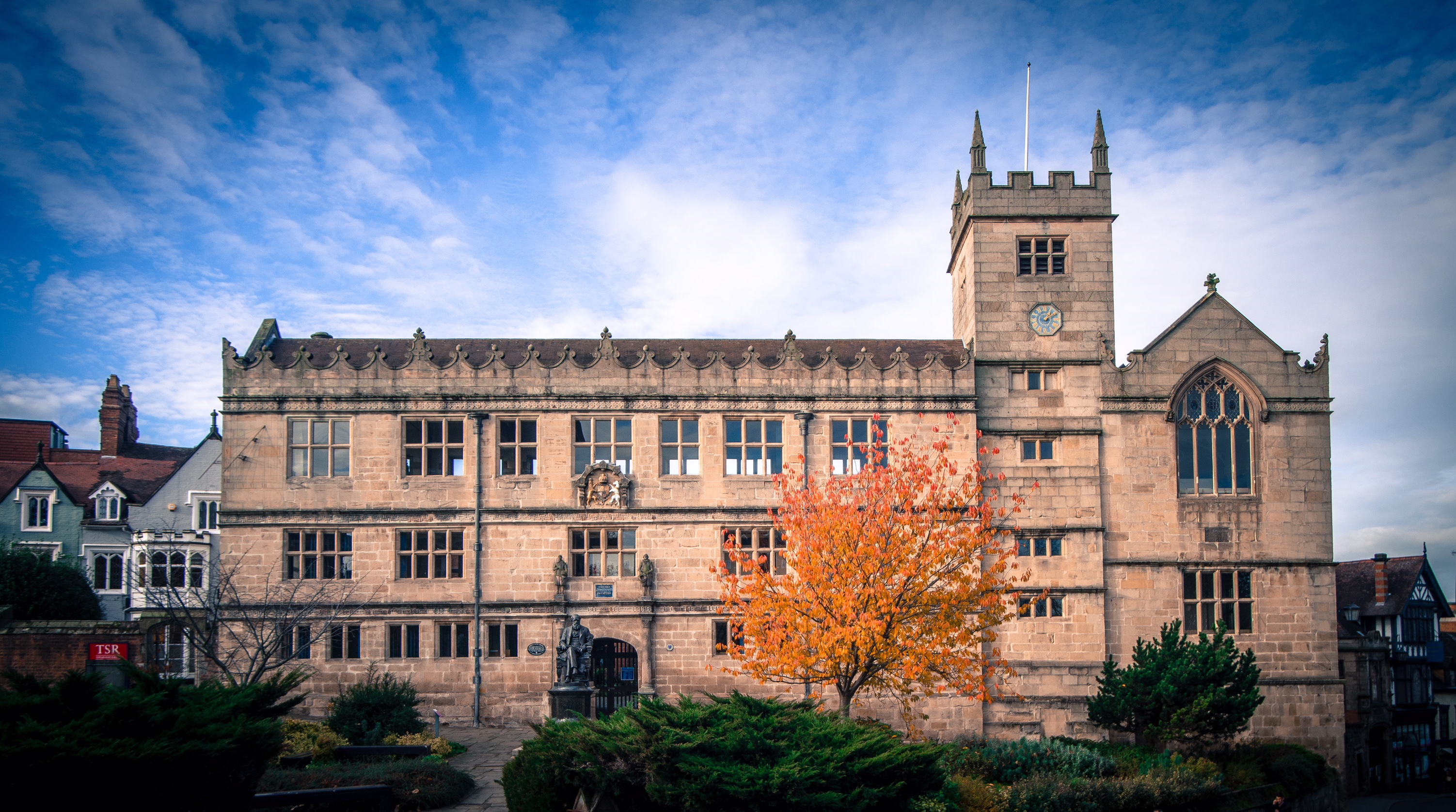
The school's original building now serves as Shrewsbury Library.

At this time, the original premises were converted to a public Free Library and Museum by the Shrewsbury Borough Council, opening in their new role in 1885; over the course of the 20th century the library purpose gradually took over the whole building, to which major restoration was done in 1983.

Blomfield also designed School House, to the east of the Main School building which was constructed during the 1880s. The new Riggs Hall (which had existed from Tudor buildings at the old site) was also built at this time, as was Churchill's Hall and Moser's Hall: these buildings are the work of William White.

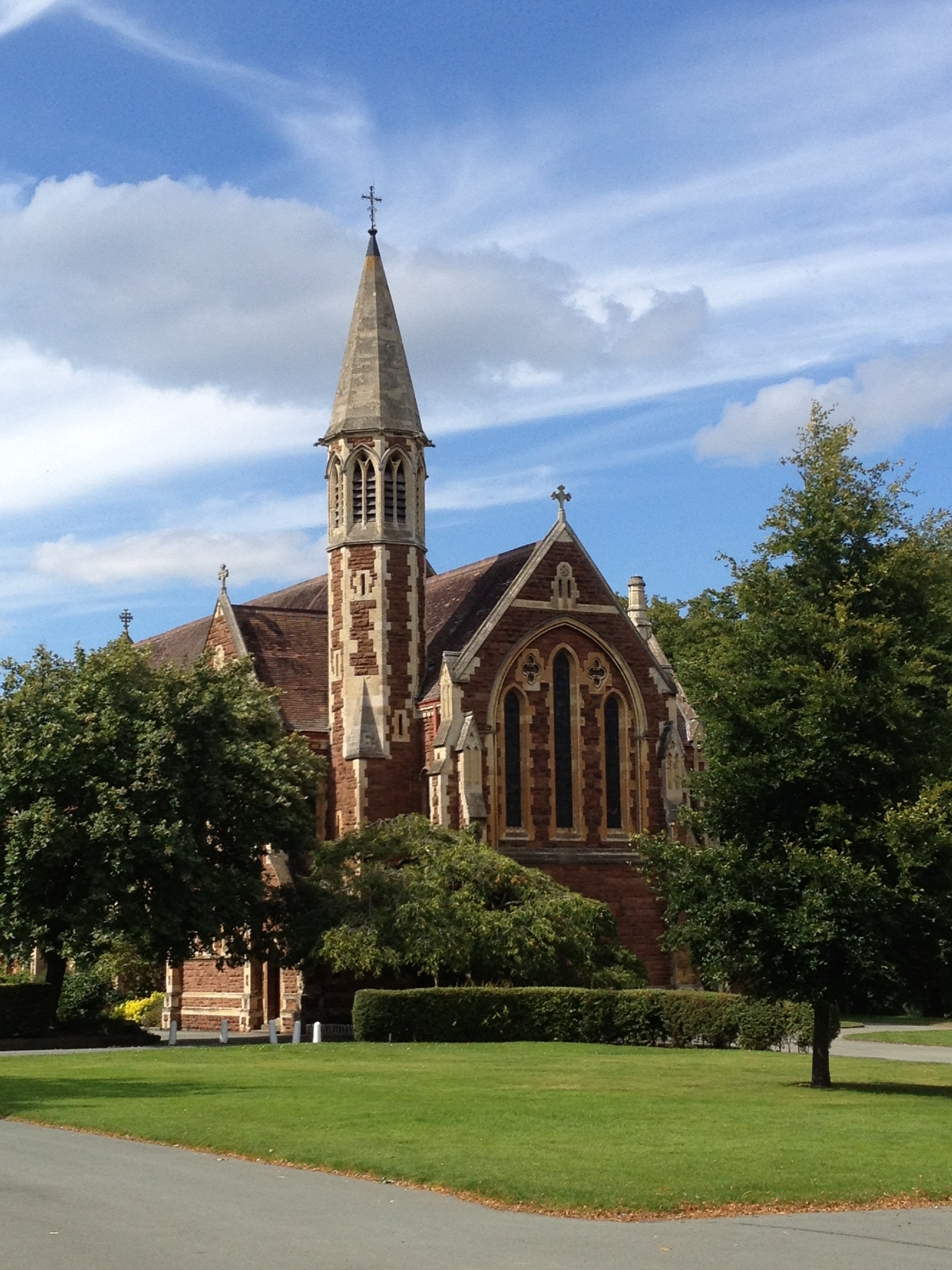
The school's current chapel, built in 1887

A gothic chapel was built for the school (also by Blomfield) in 1887, though it has been noted that "Christian religion played only a very small part in the life of the Public Schools... [and] at Shrewsbury the Governors refused to allow Butler to address the school at a service" prior to this increased focus in the Victorian period. Its south and east windows in the chapel are by Kempe, employing medieval narrative style for lives of saints, scenes from the history of the school.

Other buildings have since grown up around the edge of the site, with sports pitches in the centre, with diverse buildings being added to the new site over the last 130 years.

=== 1900s ===
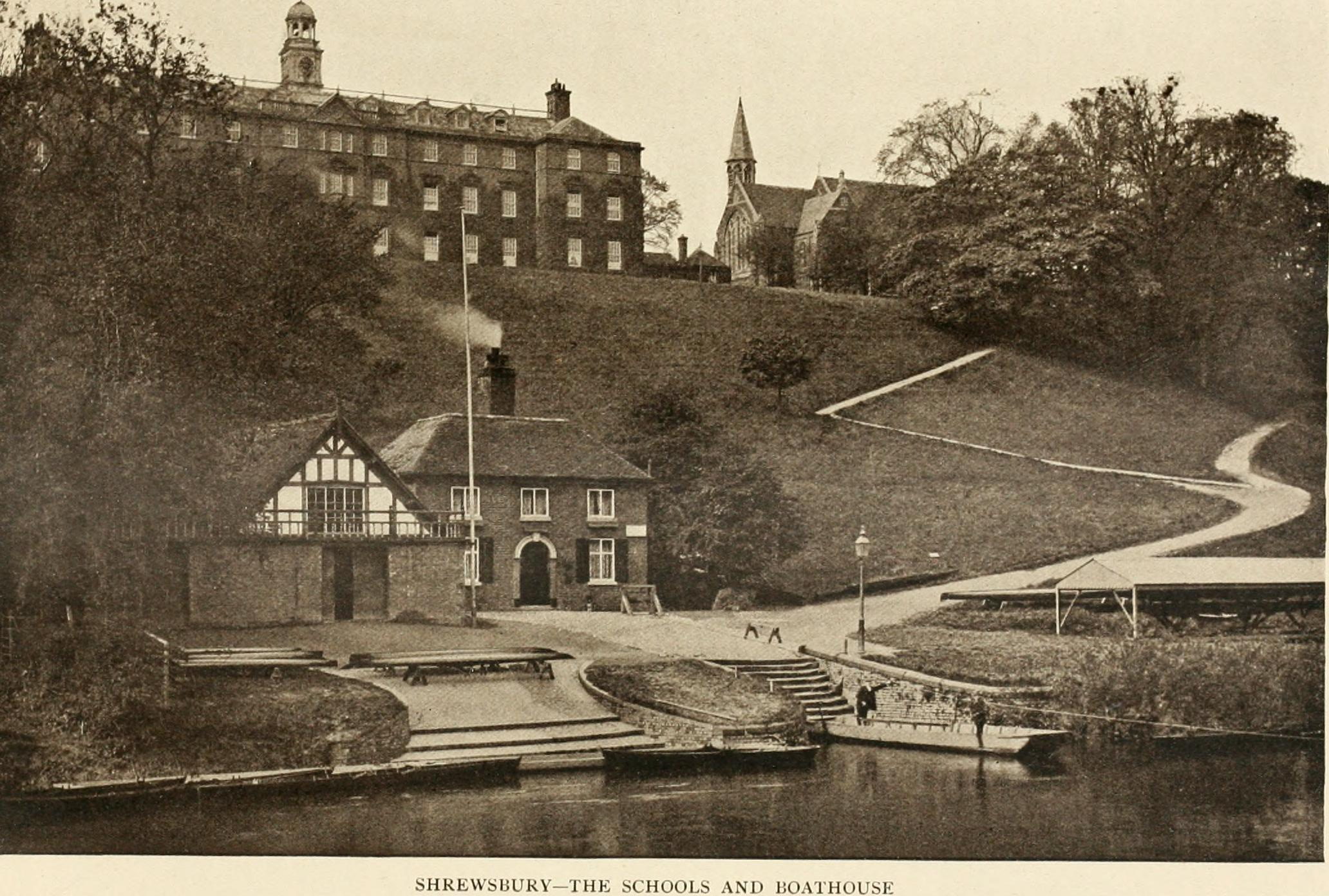
The current main school building and a since replaced boat house in 1908

The main school building suffered a major fire in 1905. Moss was succeeded in 1908 by Cyril Alington, then Master in College at Eton. Alington, though a Fellow of All Souls College, Oxford, was a sportsman, evidenced by the 1914 appointment as his secretary of Neville Cardus, the future cricket journalist who had joined the school in 1912 as the school's assistant cricket professional.

The flag of Shrewsbury School

At the time of his appointment as Headmaster, Alington was younger than any of the masters on the staff, so to bring in new blood into the teaching staff, he recruited several former Collegers from Eton, most notably The Rev. Ronald Knox. Alington wrote the school song and commissioned its flag (a banner of arms of its coat of arms), and he was an energetic builder; the school Alington Hall (assembly hall) is named after him. In December 1914 he wrote a poem, "To the School at War", which was published in The Times. After leaving Shrewsbury, Alington went on to serve as Chaplain to the King to King George V from 1921 until 1933, and then Dean of Durham, from 1933 to 1951. He appeared on the cover of Time magazine on 29 June 1931. "An accomplished classicist, a witty writer especially of light verse, and a priest of orthodox convictions ..."

During the Edwardian period Oldham's Hall was built (1911).

==== First World War and afterwards ====
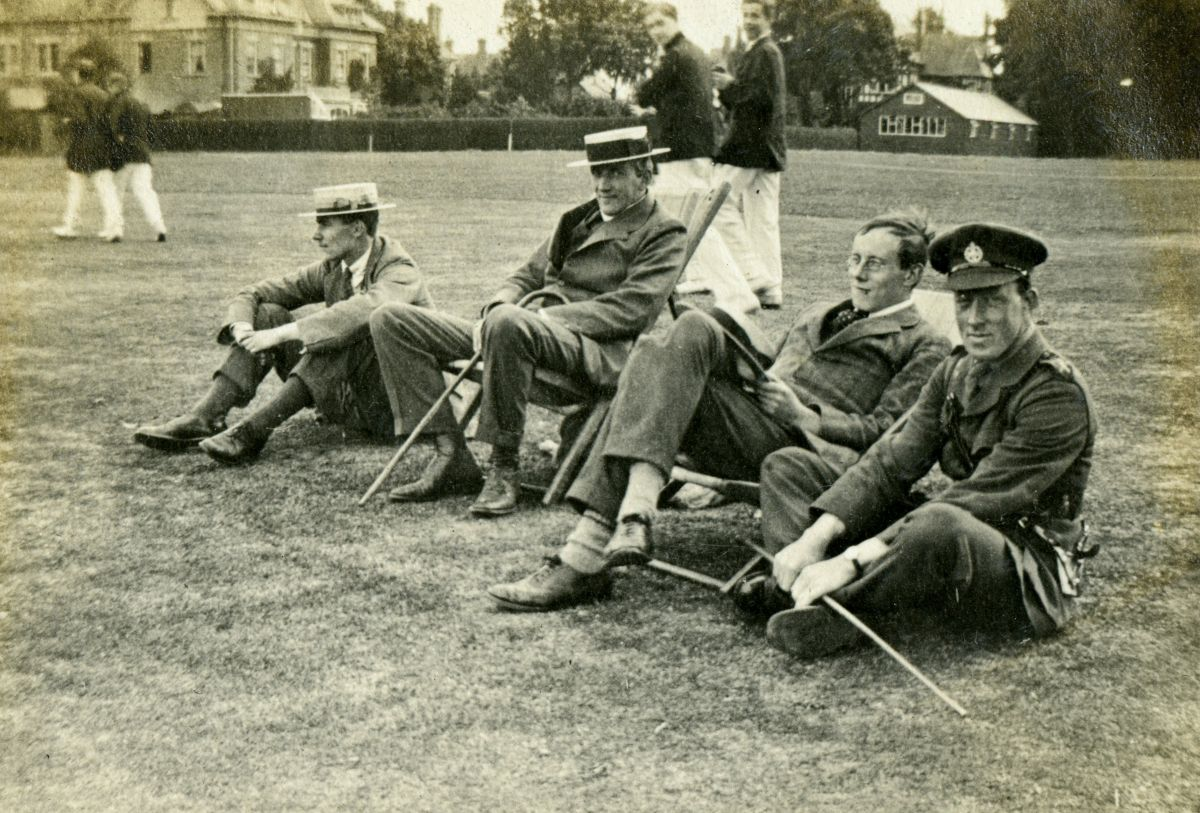
Shrewsbury School staff in 1915: FSH Ward, Headmaster Revd Cyril Alington, Philip Bainbrigge and Malcolm White (killed in July 1916 on the first day of the Battle of the Somme)

The First World War saw 321 former members of the school die serving their country. A war memorial was added to the school in 1923 for these fallen. This memorial was added to after the Second World War to include the 135 members of the school who fell in that conflict. The monument includes a statue of Sir Phillip Sidney, the Elizabeth soldier, poet and courtier (who himself was an alumnus of the school and died of wounds sustained at the Battle of Zutphen in 1586), and faces the Main School building down an avenue of linden trees, known as 'central'.

The current library building was added in 1916.

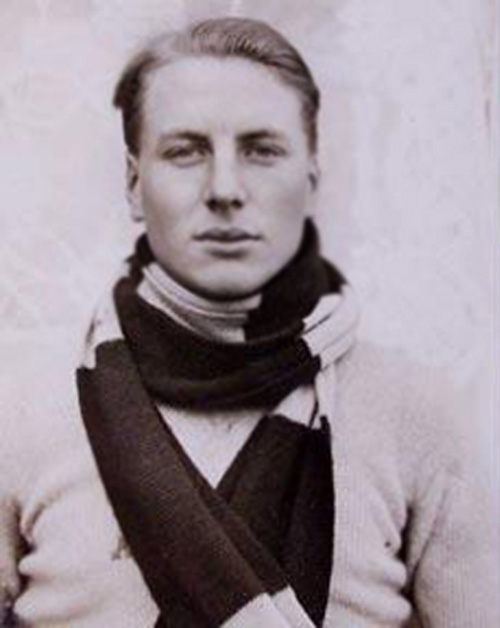
Andrew Irvine, part of the 1924 Everest Expedition

Mountaineer Andrew Irvine, who, with George Mallory may have reached the summit of Mount Everest in the 1924 British Everest Expedition attended Shrewsbury during the First World War. During the 1920s the Georgian villa houses at Severn Hill and Ridgemount were acquired by the school and adapted into boarding houses. Severn Hill, the linear decedent of the house of which Irvine was captain, holds his ice axe from the expedition, discovered in 1933 by Wyn Harris.

==== Post Second World War ====
Between 1944 and 1950 John Wolfenden (later Lord Wolfenden) was headmaster; he left Shrewsbury to become Vice-Chancellor of the University of Reading. He was appointed to various public body chairmanships by the Privy Council, and also went on to be director of the British Museum. His name is closely associated with the 1957 Wolfenden Report, which he chaired.

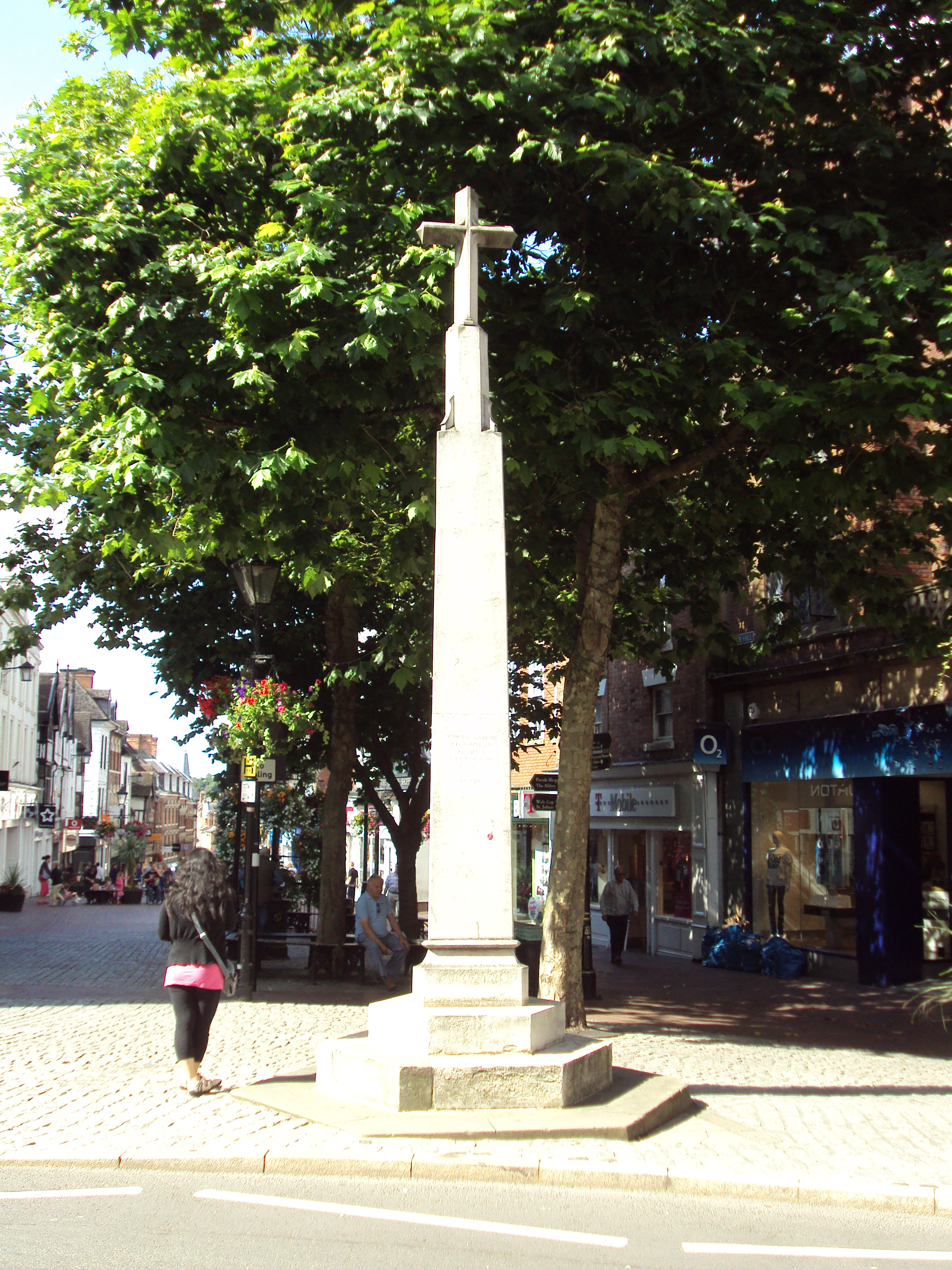
High cross given to the town of Shrewsbury by the school in 1952, replacing the lost medieval cross, to celebrate 400 years of relations between the two

In 1952, the school was 400 years old. It received a royal visit to mark the occasion, and presented the town with a new cross for the historic site of the town's high cross (which had been removed in 1705) at the termination of the market street which was a starting point for civic and religious processions in the medieval town and a significant location (the place of execution of Earl of Worcester and others after the Battle of Shrewsbury in 1403, and of Dafydd III, last native Prince of Wales in 1283).

The future Deputy Prime Minister of the UK Michael Heseltine attended the school immediately after the Second World War on a scholarship. A number of the founders and writers of the satirical magazine Private Eye attended the school in the 1950s. Willy Rushton was also at the school at this time. The comedian, actor, writer and television presenter Michael Palin of Monty Python's Flying Circus attended the school shortly afterwards and a scholarship is now available named for him.

Between 1963 and 1975 Donald Wright served as headmaster. The Times has called Wright a "great reforming headmaster". While there, working with the Anglican Diocese of Liverpool, Wright took a leading role in the building of a new Shrewsbury House, the school's mission in Liverpool, which was opened in 1974 by Princess Anne. He secured many leading churchmen to come to preach in the school chapel, including Donald Coggan, Archbishop of Canterbury. After retiring as a headmaster in 1975, Wright became the Archbishop of Canterbury's Patronage Secretary, chaired the William Temple Foundation, and served as Secretary to the Crown Appointments Commission.

In the 1960s, Kingsland House, another 19th century gentleman's residence was acquired by the school and adapted for use for central catering for all pupils (previously food had been arranged in houses). A new science building was also added in the 1960s.

Sir Eric Anderson served as headmaster between 1975 and 1980. He went on to be Rector of Lincoln College, Oxford, chairman of the Heritage Lottery Fund and Provost of Eton, among other roles.

In 1988, another Georgian villa house, the Grove, was bought and adapted for use as boarding house. In 1996 a new IT building, the Craig Building, was added.

=== 2000s ===
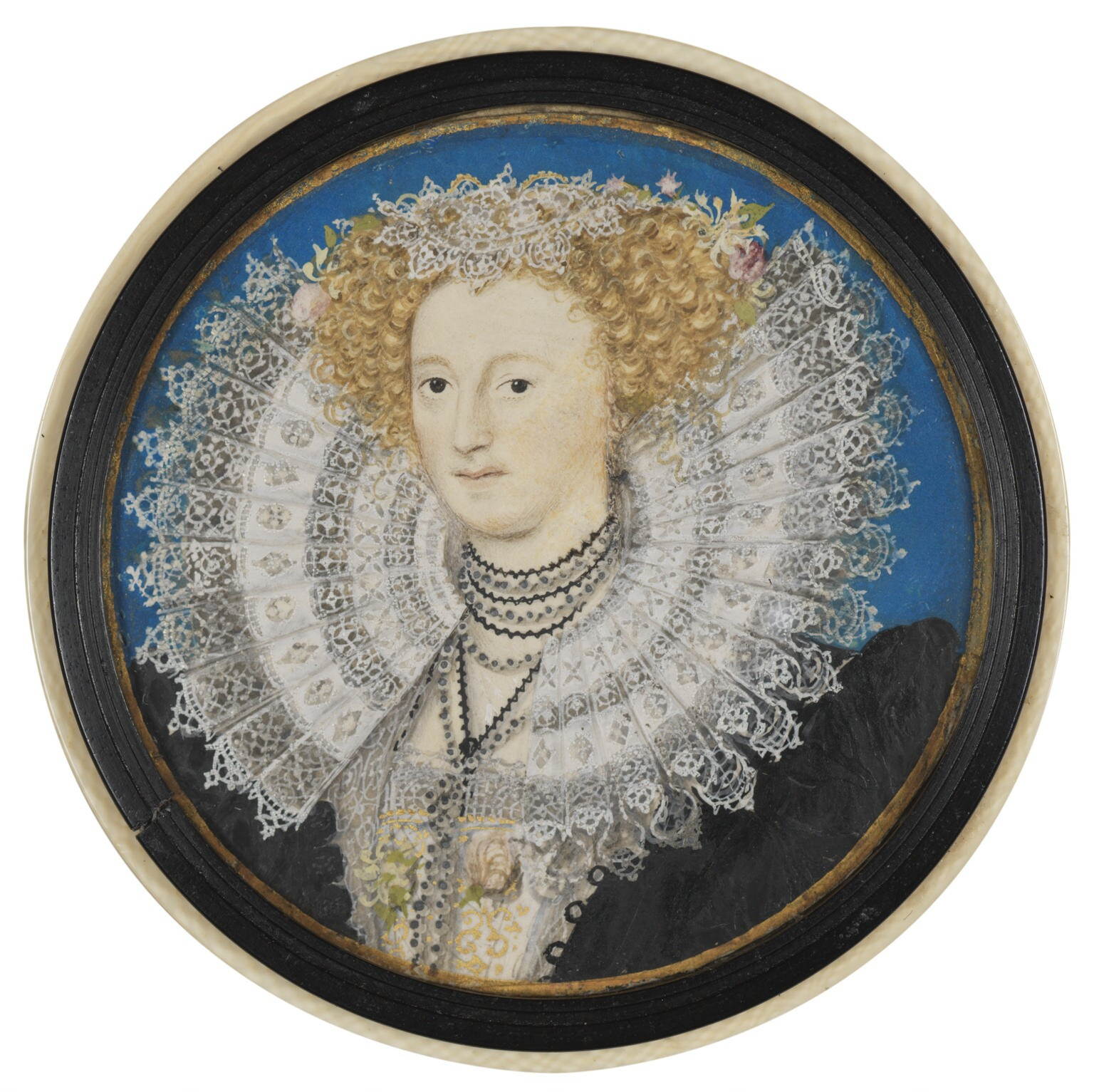
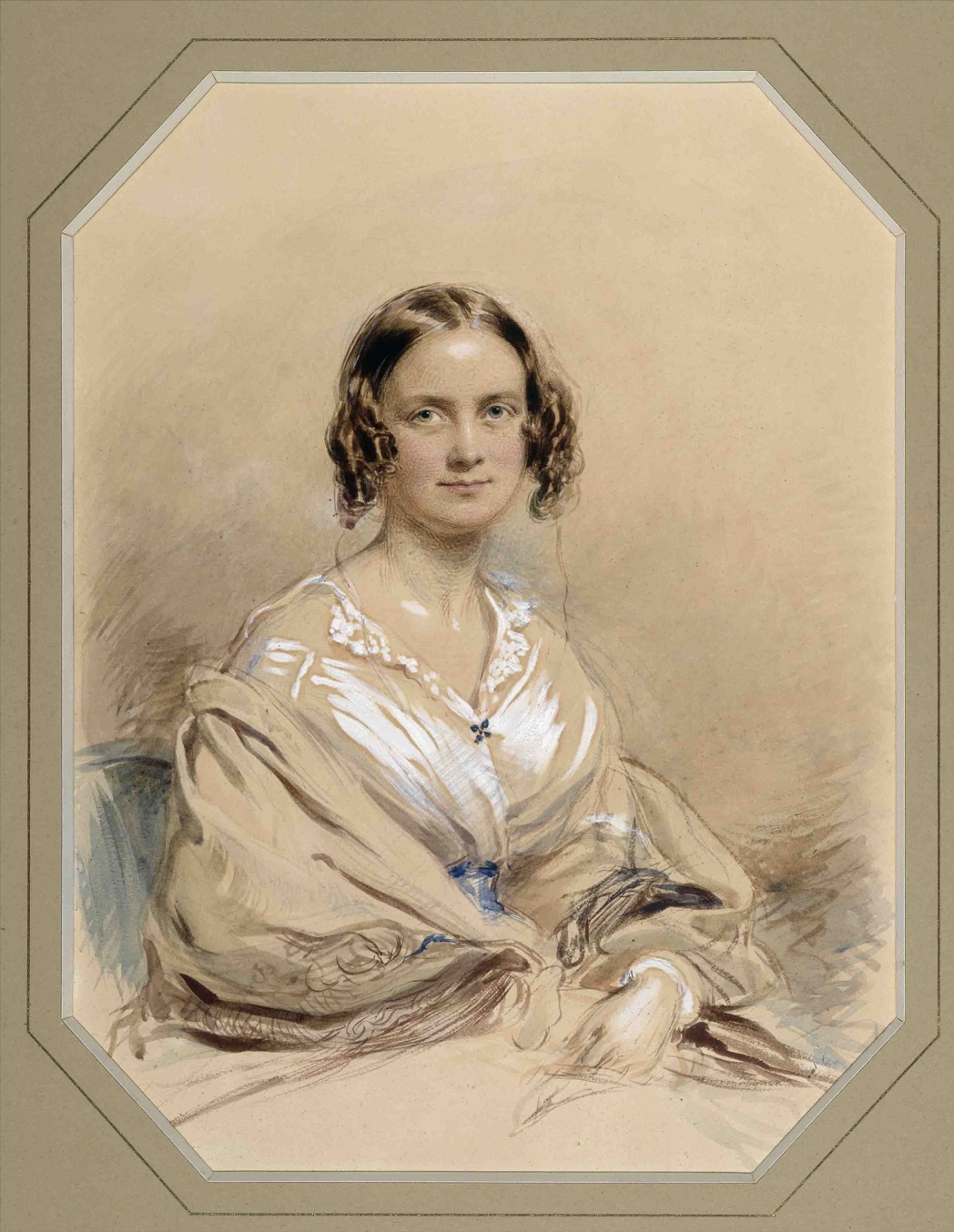
Two of the newer boarding houses, for girls, are named for Mary Sidney and Emma Darwin, whose brother and husband, respectively, were both prominent Old Salopians.

Since the turn of the millennium, the school's site has seen investment, beginning with the addition of a statue of alumnus Charles Darwin to the site to mark the millennium, which was unveiled by Sir David Attenborough.

A new music school, The Maidment Building, was opened by King Charles III (when Prince of Wales) in 2001.

Girls were admitted to the school for the first time into the sixth-form in 2008, and the school became fully coeducational in 2015.

Two new boarding houses have been built, one named after Mary Sidney (completed 2006), and one after Emma Darwin (completed 2011).

Further additions to the site have been made: an indoor cricket centre (2006) and a new swimming pool (2007); the rowing facilities were extended with a new Yale Boat house, which was opened by Olympian Matt Langridge in 2012; A new Computing and Design faculty building, "the Chatri Design Centre" was established in 2017, re-purposing and redeveloping a former humanities building; and in 2015 a new building, Hodgeson Hall, was built to house the humanities departments.

A new theatre was opened in 2022.

In 2023 a new boarding house was opened, named to honour Elizabeth II.

== Sports ==
The main sport in the Michaelmas (autumn) term is football, in the Lent term fives and rugby, and in summer cricket. Rowing takes place in all three terms. The kit of many of the sports teams shows a cross pattée from the crown in the school's coat of arms, which is a practice that has been in place for at least 150 years. During much of the twentieth century, this cross was used solely by the school's boatclub.

Admission of girls in 2015 has seen the introduction of hockey and netball, with cricket and tennis played during the summer term.

The present school buildings in Kingsland are arranged around the sports fields which have nine grass football pitches, two Hockey Astroturf and a 4G artificial football pitch (completed in 2023); almost all boys play football in the Michaelmas term, with girls playing football in the Lent term.

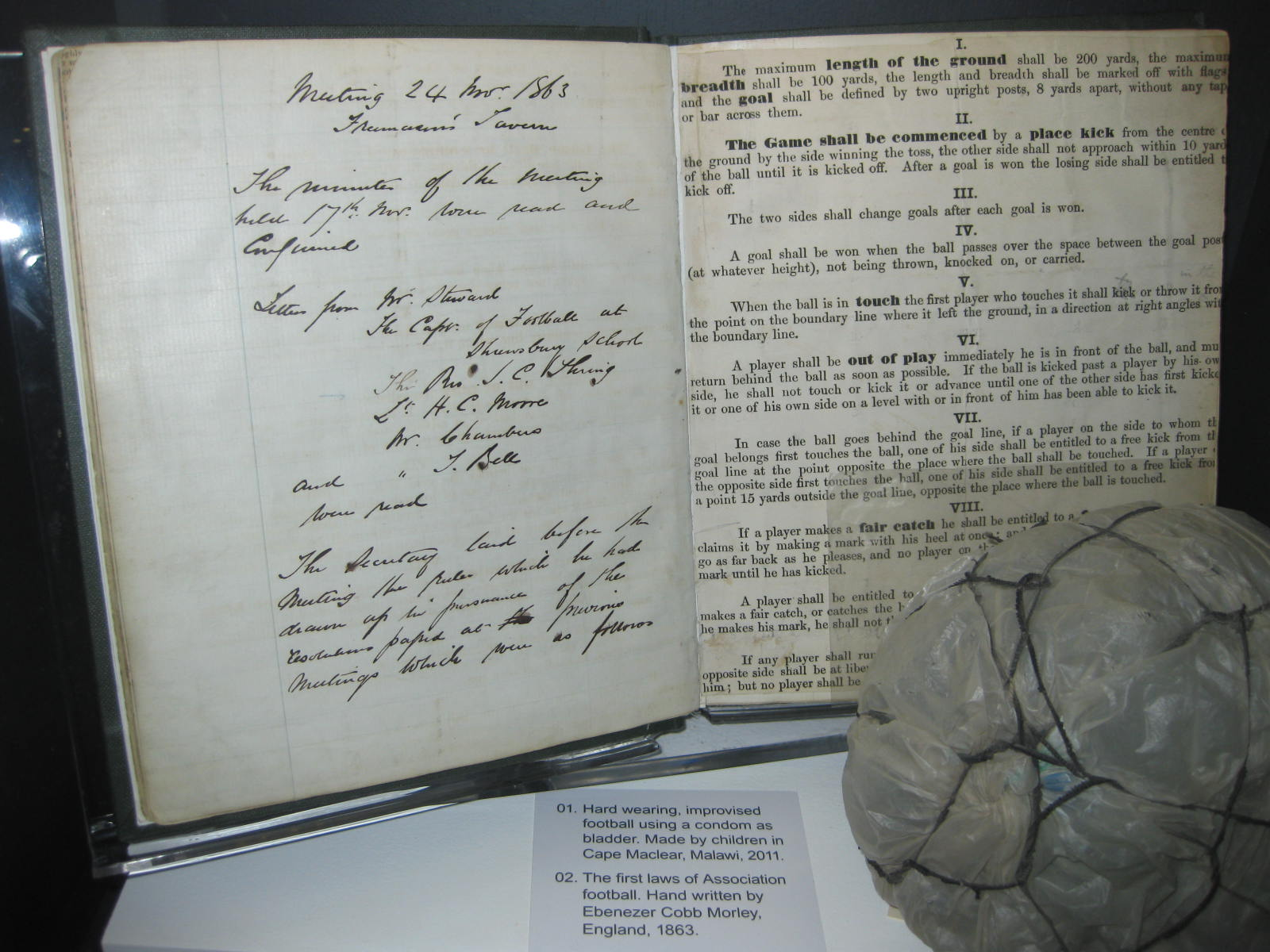
The original hand written 'Laws of the game' for association football of 1863 on display at the National Football Museum, Manchester; note the references to "The Captain of Football at Shrewsbury School” and also to the Old Salopian The Rev J C Thring, who was a prominent and influential voice in favour of the kicking and dribbling game rather than the ‘hacking’ or the ‘carrying’ game.

=== Football ===
Football, as a formal game, was incubated at the public schools of the nineteenth century and Shrewsbury had a key role in the game's development. Salopians were prominent in the early history of the organised game at Cambridge University, according to Adrian Harvey "Salopians formed a club of their own in the late 1830s/early 1840s but that was presumably absorbed by the Cambridge University Football Club that they were so influential in creating in 1846". The school has an 1856 copy of the Cambridge rules of football, predating the 1863 rules of the FA.

In these early years, each of the schools had their own versions of the game, and by the 1830s the version played at Shrewsbury had become known as "douling", taking this name from the Greek word for slave: the goal had no cross bar, favoured dribbling, and was being formally supported by the school's authorities to the extent it was compulsory. While, at the beginning of the 18th century, however, the school authorities deemed football "only fit for butchers boys", an attitude common at the other public schools, by the 1840s all boarders were required to play Douling three times a week unless they were excused on medical grounds.

From 1853, the national press was publishing reports of football at the school, although at this time matches were predominantly between the various Houses. The school's first captain of football was appointed in 1854, and a school team was formed in the early 1860s for external matches. Also by the 1860s football was sufficiently well-established for all Houses to field 1st and 2nd XI sides across all age groups.

The Arthur Dunn Challenge Cup (annual football cup competition played between the Old Boys of public schools started in 1903) was contested by Shrewsbury and Charterhouse in the first ever final, and shared by the two institutions following two draws, with two Morgan-Owen brothers choosing instead to turn out for Shrewsbury, instead of playing internationally in a Wales vs. Ireland game for which they had been selected. Shrewsbury has won the Arthur Dunn Challenge Cup a total of 11 times, including the Centenary Cup Final in 2003, a replay of the first final in 1903. A club of Old Salopians attending the University of Cambridge, who had started playing association football in 1874, entered the FA Cup in 1875–76, but scratched when drawn away to Oxford University.

Shrewsbury has won the Independent Schools Football Association Boodles ISFA Cup twice: in 2000 and 2010.

In 2024, Shrewsbury School were crowned English Schools Football Association (ESFA) National Champions.

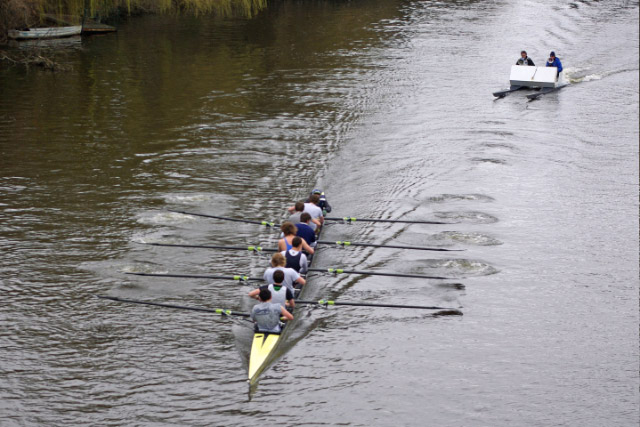
A rowing VIII of the school's training on the River Severn

=== Rowing ===
The Royal Shrewsbury School Boat Club (RSSBC) is one of the oldest school rowing clubs, having begun as an unofficial sport frowned upon by the authorities, in the late 18th or early 19th century and the first official event being known to have happened in 1839, complete with military bands. The boat club was finally officially constituted in 1866.

Since the boat club began rowing at Henley Royal Regatta in 1912, they have won 14 times. Shrewsbury is only seconded in victories at Henley to Eton, having won specifically:

- Elsenham Cup: 1919
- Princess Elizabeth Challenge Cup: 1955, 1957, 1960, 1961, 2007
- Ladies’ Challenge Plate Winner: 1932
- Special Race for Schools/Fawley Challenge Cup: 1975,1976, 1980, 1981, 1982, 1984, 1985

Royal Shrewsbury School Boat Club Rowing Blade, the cross pattée emblem (taken from the Tudor crown in the school's arms) is commonly used by sports teams.

Shrewsbury is one of only two public schools to have bumps races, the other being Eton, between the houses. They are rowed over four evenings at the end of term in July. There are usually three boats entered per house. On the fourth evening there are prizes for the leaders of the chart and the Leadbitter Cup for the boat which has made the most bumps over the four nights. The event is marshalled by senior rowers and rowing prefects, usually masters. The crew training is mainly pupil driven, though in preparation for Henley the school's First VIII rowers often do not take part, and therefore the boats are composed of other rowers and some non-rowers. Previously, races were run every day until there were no more bumps (i.e. until they were nominally in speed order). This historical set-up could lead to weeks of racing and it was therefore abandoned in favour of a four-day version more than 100 years ago. Otherwise, it is only Oxford and Cambridge that continue to have bumps. Shrewsbury and Eton both race bumps in fours whilst Oxford and Cambridge race in eights.

The town's rowing club, Pengwern Boat Club, has close historical links to the School's rowing activities, and for a time they jointly rented a boat house at the site of the current Pengwern club house.

A former captain of the boat club, John Lander, is the only Olympic gold medallist to have been killed in action in World War 2. GB Olympic silver medalist Rebecca Romero, and Paralympian Becca Chin both recently been appointed to coach within the club.

=== Running ===
The Royal Shrewsbury School Hunt (RSSH or "the Hunt") is the oldest cross-country club in the world, with written records (the Hound Books) going back to 1831 and evidence that it was established by 1819. The sport of "the Hunt" or "the Hounds", now known as a Paper Chase, was formalised at the school around 1800. Two runners (the "foxes") made a trail with paper shreds and after a set time they would be pursued by the other runners (the "hounds"). The club officers are the Huntsman and Senior and Junior Whips. The hounds start most races paired into "couples" as in real fox hunting; the winner of a race is said to "kill". Certain of the races are started by the Huntsman, carrying a 200-year-old bugle and a ceremonial whip, dressed in scarlet shirt and a black velvet cap shouting:

All hounds who wish to run, run hard, run well, and may the devil take the hindmost

before lounging the bugle: and this has been done for nearly 200 years.

In his 1903 semi-autobiographical novel The Way of All Flesh, Old Salopian Samuel Butler describes a school based on Shrewsbury where the main protagonist's favourite recreation is running with "the Hounds" so "a run of six or seven miles across country was no more than he was used to". The first definite record of the Annual Steeplechase is in 1834, making it the oldest cross-country race of the modern era.

The main inter-house cross-country races are still called the Junior and Senior Paperchase, although no paper is dropped and urban development means the historical course can no longer be followed. Every October the whole school participates in a 3.5-mile run called "The Tucks", originally intended to prevent pupils attending a local horse race. It is now run at Attingham Park.

The school also lays claim to the oldest track and field meeting still in existence, which originated in the Second Spring Meeting first documented in 1840. This featured a series of mock horse races including the Derby Stakes, the Hurdle Race, the Trial Stakes and a programme of throwing and jumping events, with runners being entered by "owners" and named as though they were horses.

=== Cricket ===
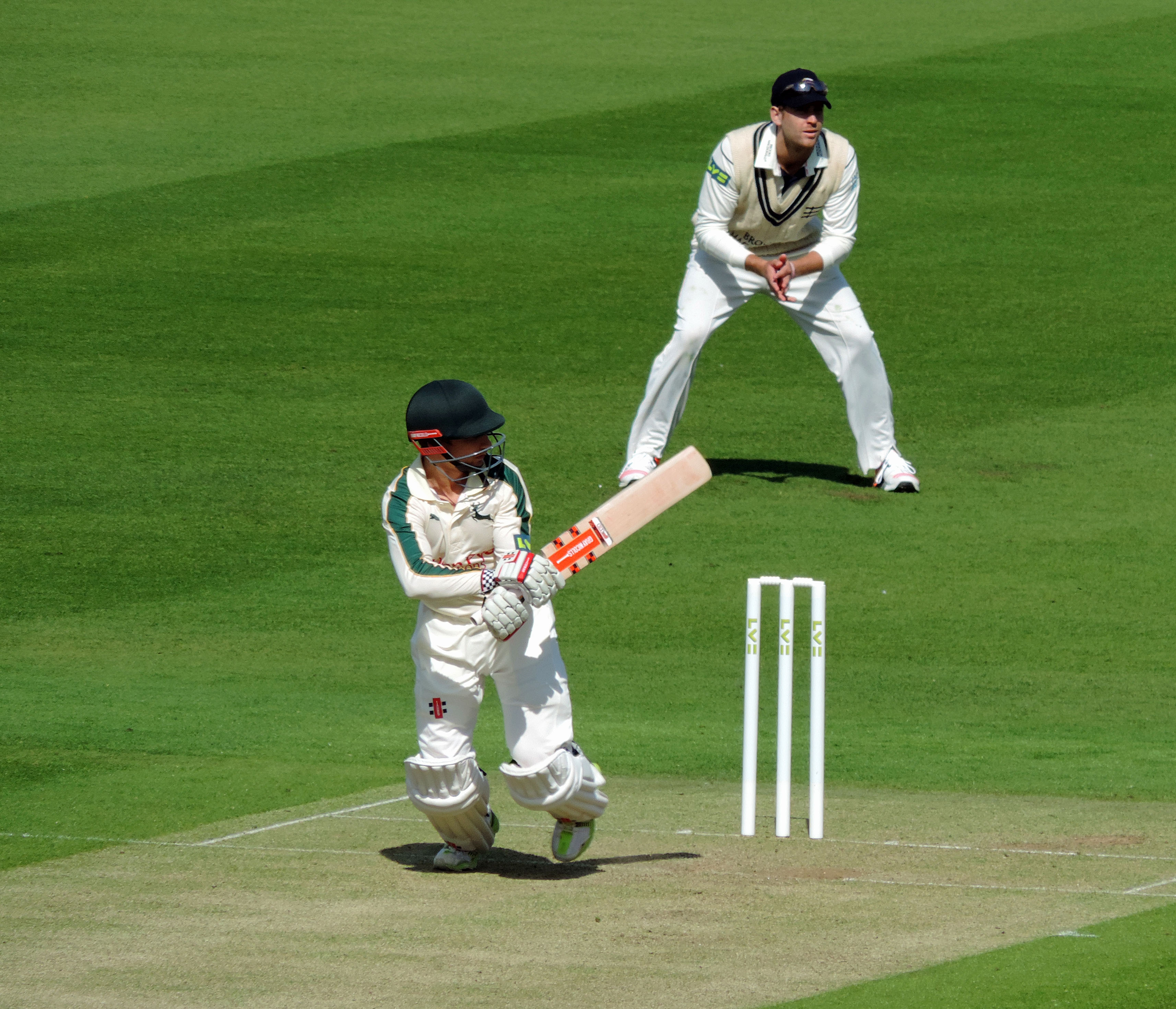
Cricketer, commentator and selector James Taylor played for the school.

Cricket was being played at Shrewsbury at least as long ago as the 1840s, with Charles Calvert, who went on to win a Blue at Cambridge captaining the side between 1842 and 1844. The oldest photographic record of a cricket team at the school is from 1868, and a reference was made to an effort to set up a game with Westminster School in 1866 (declined by Westminster) in a House of Commons debate by Jim Prior in 1961. Neville Cardus was the school's cricket professional in the early twentieth century.

Boys' 1st XI season focuses on the Silk Trophy, which competed for by Shrewsbury, Eton, Oundle and an overseas touring side at the end of each summer term.

The school competes in the HMC Twenty20 having made the finals day each year since 2010, winning the competition in 2011 and 2013. The school won the Lord's Taverners Trophy in 2005.

Old Salopians who have played county cricket include James Taylor, Scott Ellis, Nick Pocock, The Hon. Tim Lamb, Ian Hutchinson., Ed Barnard, Steve Leach, Ed Pollock, Dion Holden, Dave Lloyd, George Garrett, Issy Wong, Theo Wylie and Dillon Pennington.

=== Eton Fives ===
Eton Fives is a major sport within the school, and there are 14 Fives courts. At the end of the Lent Term the school competes in the Marsh Insurance National Schools Eton Fives Championships, which are held in rotation at Shrewsbury, Highgate and Eton.

A world record was set at the school in 1989 for the longest ever game of fives (at 39 hours of playing); this was eclipsed by Uppingham School in 2019.

=== Minor sports ===
Minor sports include: shooting, fencing, basketball, golf, equestrian, badminton, swimming, hockey, rugby and squash.

== Performing arts ==
=== Heritage ===
==== Early flowerings of English drama in the Tudor period ====
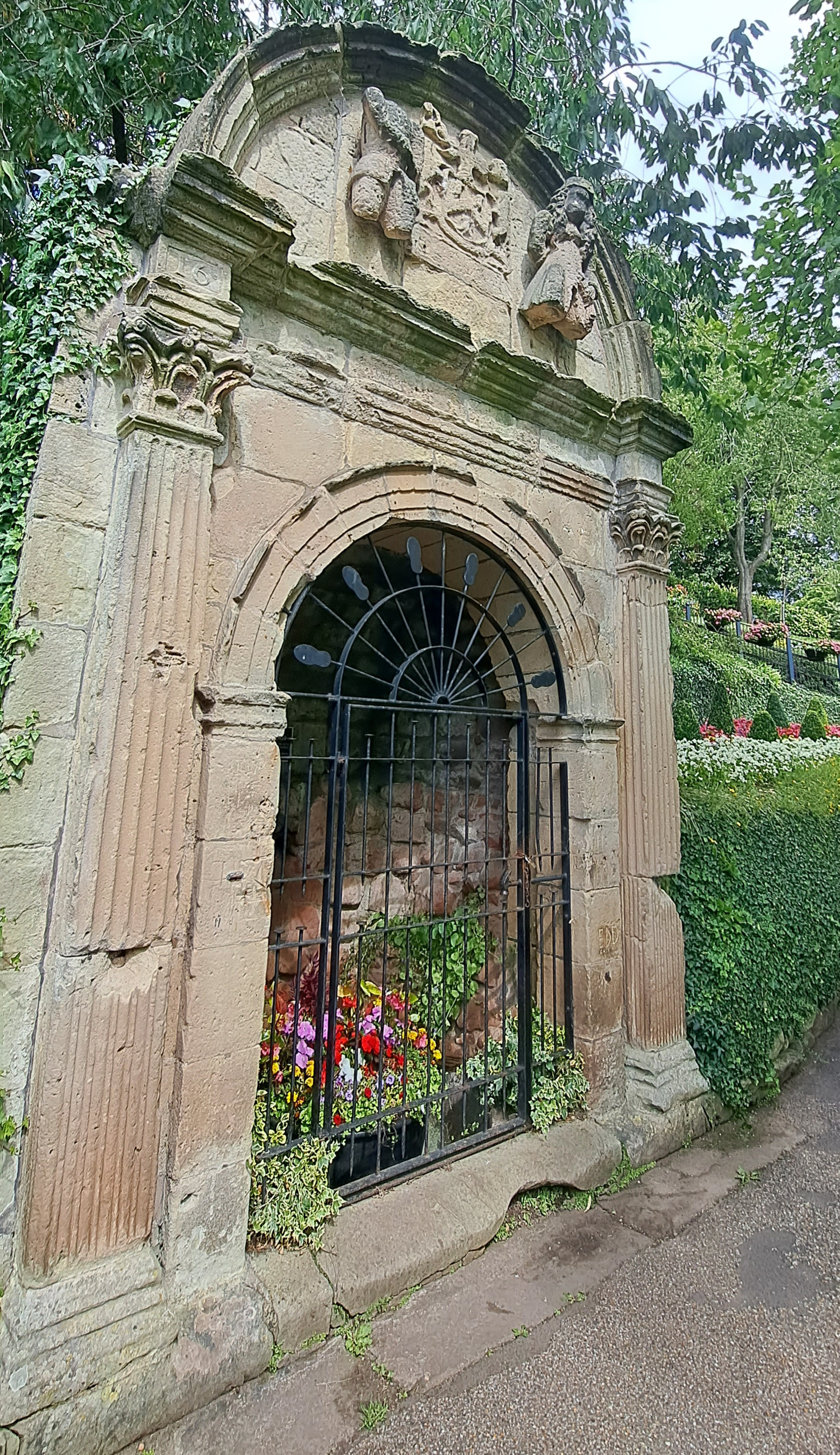
The 1679 Shoemakers Arbour (now removed to the Quarry Park); originally located along with many other guild arbours on the Kingsland site. A legacy of the pageantry and performance heritage of the town and school on the early modern period.

Prior to the Reformation the site of the school as Kingsland was a focus of pageantry and performance.

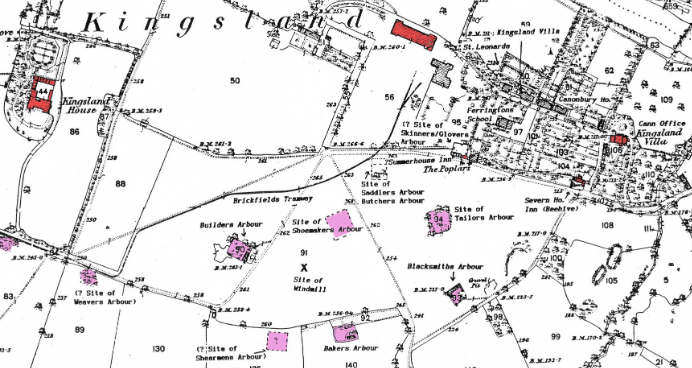
Locations of the guild arbours for the pageantry in the early modern period and before on the Kingsland site

By the early modern period that cultural practice had developed to the extent that multiple arbours were built over the territory.

Under Thomas Ashton drama flourished. He made it a rule that, boys in the senior form had, every school day, to "declaim and play one Act of Comedy" before breaking from school, and the school put on frequent public Whitsuntide and mystery plays concerned with moral romance, scripture, and history. In 1565, for instance, Julian the Apostle and another unnamed performance of Ashton's were performed before a large audience, which "listened with admiration and devotion". Queen Elizabeth I, on a journey to the West Midlands in 1565 intended to visit Shrewsbury to see one of these performances, but "her Majesty not having proper information mistook the time and when she came to Coventry, hearing it was over, returned to London". The Quarry park in the town had long been a place for sort and cultural activity in the old town, and this was the site of many of these plays, and a bank there cut in the form of an amphitheatre was established near the rope walk. Such plays were, according to Thomas Warton, probably the first fruits of the English theater.

On several occasions the school put on pageants for the visiting Council of the Marches, as in 1581 when the Lord President, Sir Henry Sidney, leaving the town by barge, was greeted by several scholars on an island down stream of the castle dressed as green nymphs with willow branches tied to their heads reciting verses across the water:

And will your honour needs depart, and must it needs be so. Would God we could like fishes swim, that we might with thee go.

The Lord President was brought close to tears.

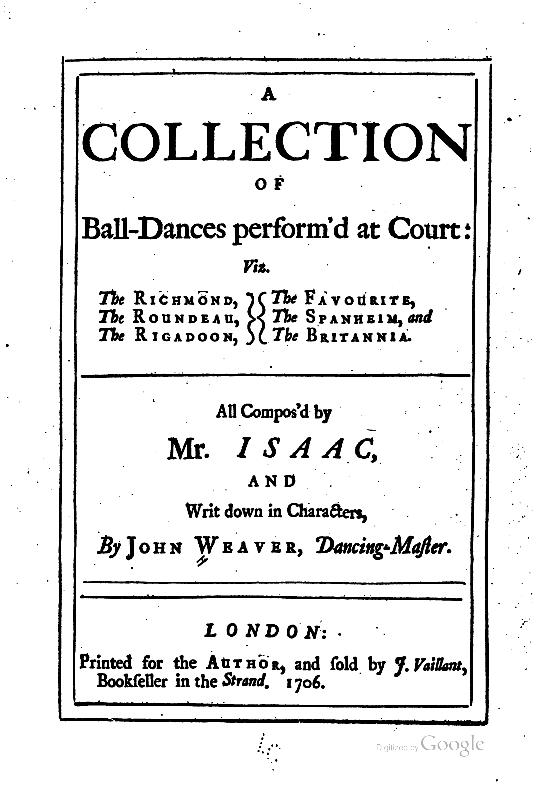
Title page of A collection of ball-dances perform'd at court by Mr. Isaac, John Weaver (1673–1760), James Paisible: "A collection of ball-dances perform'd at court: viz. the Richmond, the Roundeau, the Rigadoon, the Favourite, the Spanheim, and the Britannia" (1706)

==== Originating ballet and pantomime ====
John Weaver, the father of English ballet, and the originator of pantomime, was the master at the school in the 1600s. He was responsible for the codification of dance.

He documented courtly dances which were a feature of courtly ritual in the Tudor and Steward period, and were a sincere instrument of statecraft to the holders of public office in those times. In 2023 the school hosted the inaugural "John Weaver Festival of Dance", which included competitive performance of the art, along with an exhibition, which displayed Weavers own papers and material from Soulton Hall relating to its historic dancing pavement.

=== Contemporary Offer ===
==== Orchestras, ensembles and choirs ====
The school has the following orchestras ensembles and choirs:

- The Symphony Orchestra;
- The Wind Orchestra;
- Big Band;
- Concert Band;
- Brass Ensemble
- String Ensemble
- The Chamber Choir
- The Chapel Choir
- The Community Choir (includes local members who are not part of the school)
- Jazz Band
- String quartets
- Junior and Senior string ensembles
- Clarinet and sax groups
- Tuba and horn quartets

==== Musicals ====
Every other year (and sometimes more often), Shrewsbury puts on its own homegrown school musical which is taken to the Edinburgh Festival Fringe. These have included:

- Rebecca the Drowned Bride
- What You Will
- Bubble
- Jekyll!
- Gatsby: A New Musical
- The Traitor's Wife
- Brodie & Co.

==== Performances ====
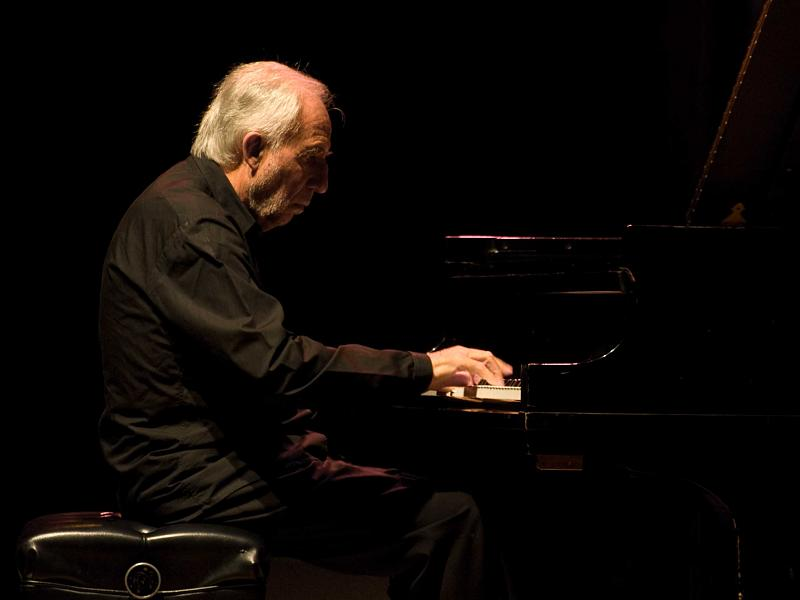
Jacques Loussier performed at the school in the early 2000s.

High-profile musicians and performers also visit the school with such visitors including:

- Jacques Loussier
- The Swingles
- Cristina Ortiz
- Tenebrae Choir
- Joe Stilgoe
- Jason Rebello
- Jenny Agutter
- Voces8
- Peter Donohoe

== Culture ==
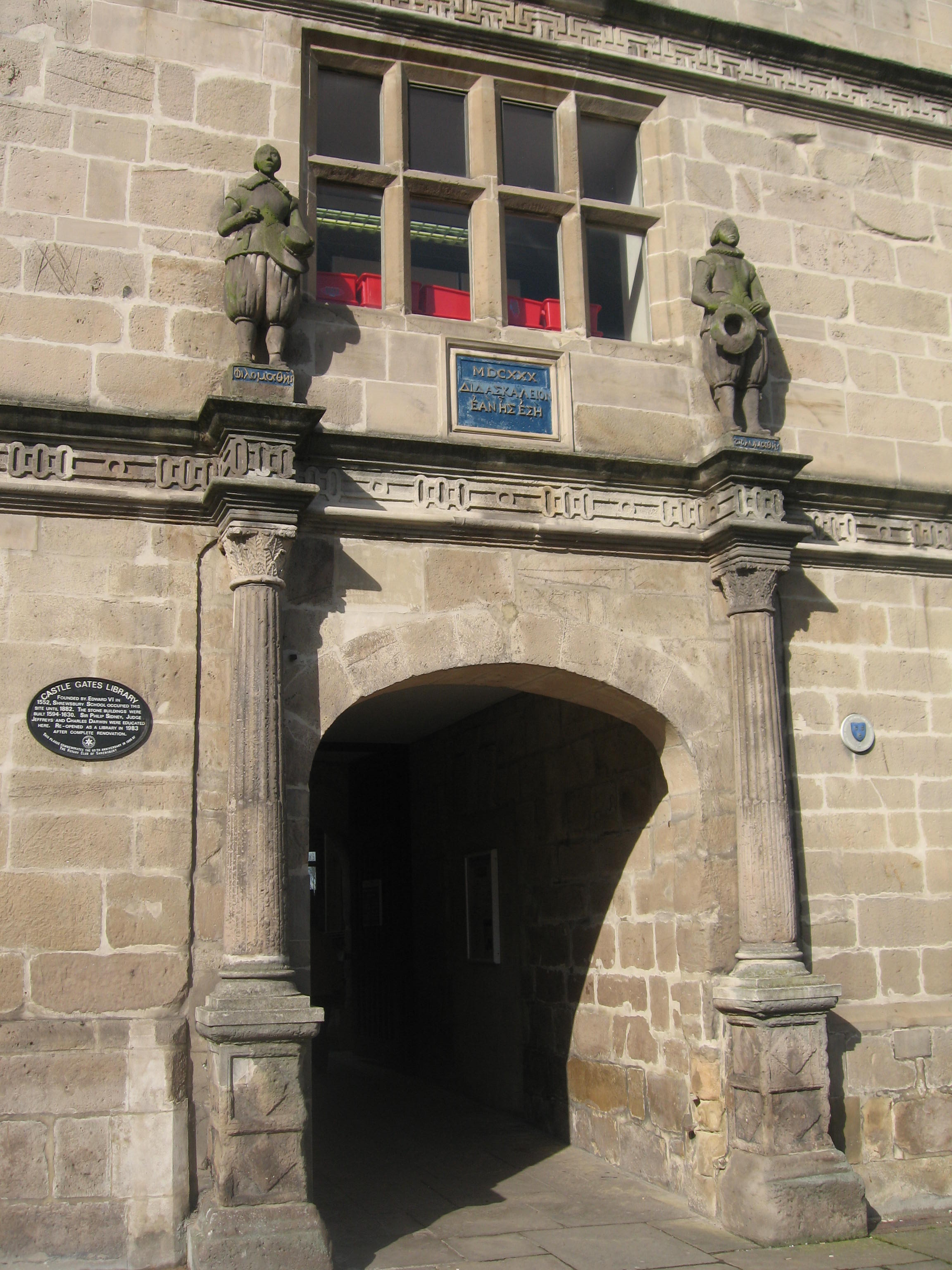
Two stone statues of Philomathes and Polymathes in Jacobean dress, on the original buildings; also featured on the contemporary school library

=== Philomath and Polymath ===
The original buildings and the present school library both have carved stone figures on the buildings. They represent, on the left Φιλομαθης Philomathes [he who loves learning] (a character first penned by King James I in philosophical dialogue known as Daemonologie) and on the right Πολυμαθης Polymathes [he who has much learning]. The first figure has taken his hat off to settle to learning; the second figure is about to place his hat back on, having attended to his studies.

The original carvings are from 1630 and are accompanied by a table which says:

MDCXXX [1630]

ΔΙΔΑΣΚΑΛΕΙΟΝ

ΕΑΝ ΗΣ ΕΣΗ

This is based on a quotation from Isocrates, "ἐαν ἠς φιλομαθης, ἐσει πολυμαθης", which means "If you are studious (loving learning), you will be(come) learned"; Διδασκαλειον means 'school'.

Although the school left the premises by the castle in 1882, it retained, significantly, the ownership of these statutes which remain in the Renaissance building.

=== Houses ===
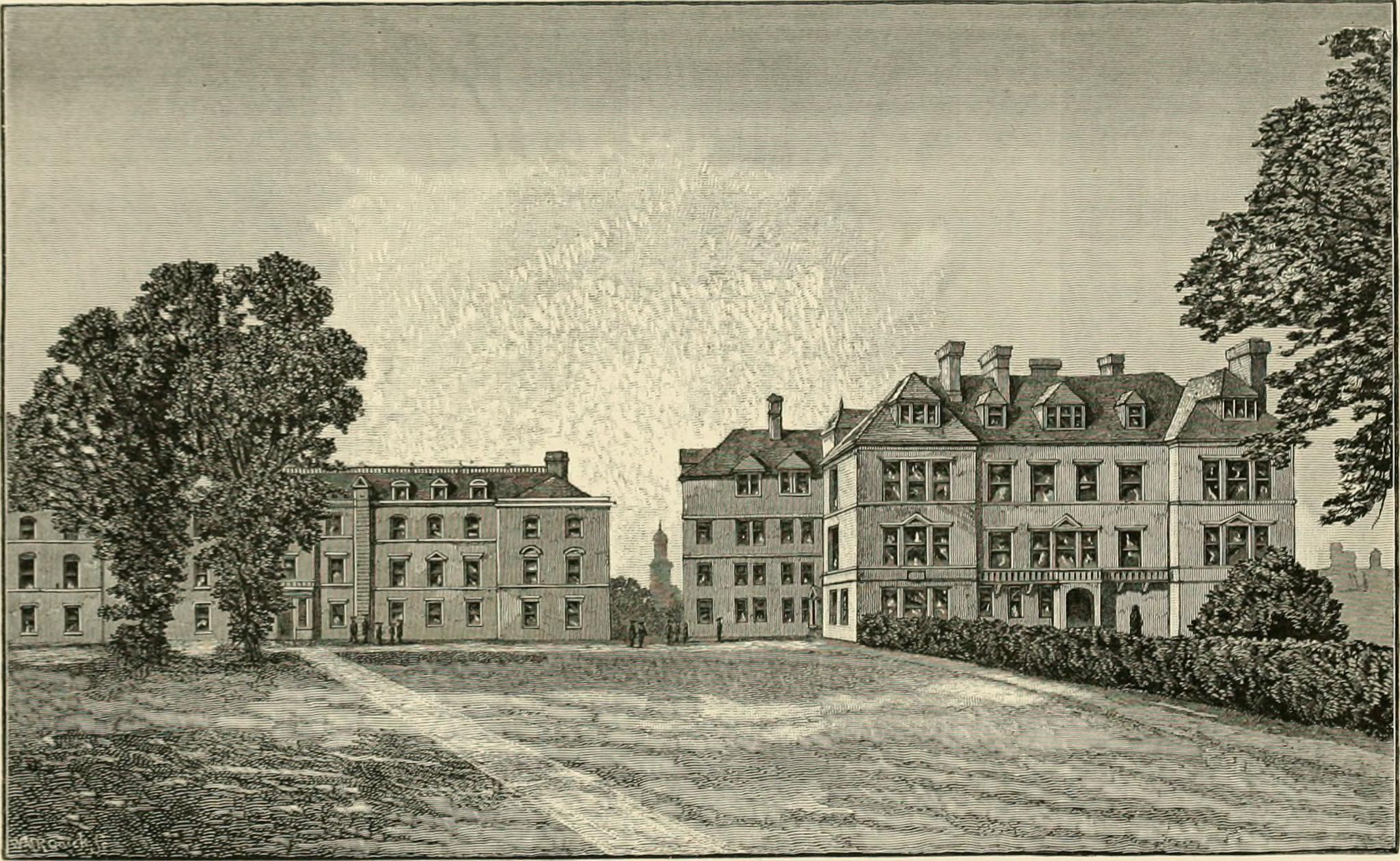
School House in 1899

The School, as of Michaelmas Term 2023, has 842 pupils.

There are seven boys' houses and five girls' houses, each with its own housemaster or housemistress, tutor team and matron. Each house also has its own colours.

The houses and their colours are:

House	Colours	Notes
Churchill's Hall	Dark Blue & Light Blue	Opened in 1882, listed building
Emma Darwin Hall	Wedgwood Blue & Green	Opened in September 2011
The Grove	Cornflower Blue & White	Converted to girls' house in summer 2014
Ingram's Hall	Green & White	Opened in 1900
Mary Sidney Hall	Navy & Cerise	Opened in September 2008
Moser's Hall	Red & Black	Opened in 1884, listed building
Oldham's Hall	Chocolate & White	Opened in 1911, listed building
Queen Elizabeth Hall	Royal Purple and Dark Green	Opened in September 2023
Ridgemount	Royal Blue & Old Gold	Opened in 1926, listed building
Rigg's Hall	Chocolate & Gold	Opened in 1882, listed building
School House	Black, Magenta & White	Opened in 1882, listed building
Severn Hill	Maroon & French Grey	Formerly known as Chances

A single house will hold around 70 pupils, School House slightly more. Having about 80 pupils, School House used to be divided into Doctors (black and white) and Headroom (magenta and white) for most sporting purposes, whilst being one house in other respects, but this distinction was abolished in around 2000.

There are many inter-house competitions: in football, for instance, each house competes in four different leagues (two senior, two junior) and three knock-out competitions (two senior, one junior).

=== School song ===
The school has its own song, "Carmen Salopiense", written in 1916 by Cyril Alington who was Headmaster at the time.

=== Masque ===
To celebrate the 400-year anniversary of the school's foundation, in 1952, a masque was written which set out the history, great figures, and values of the school.

Music was by John Ranald Stainer, OBE, FRCM, FRCO, Hon RAM, and the script was written by Paul Dehn OS (best known for the screenplays for Goldfinger, The Spy Who Came in from the Cold, the Planet of the Apes sequels and Murder on the Orient Express).

== Grants and prizes ==
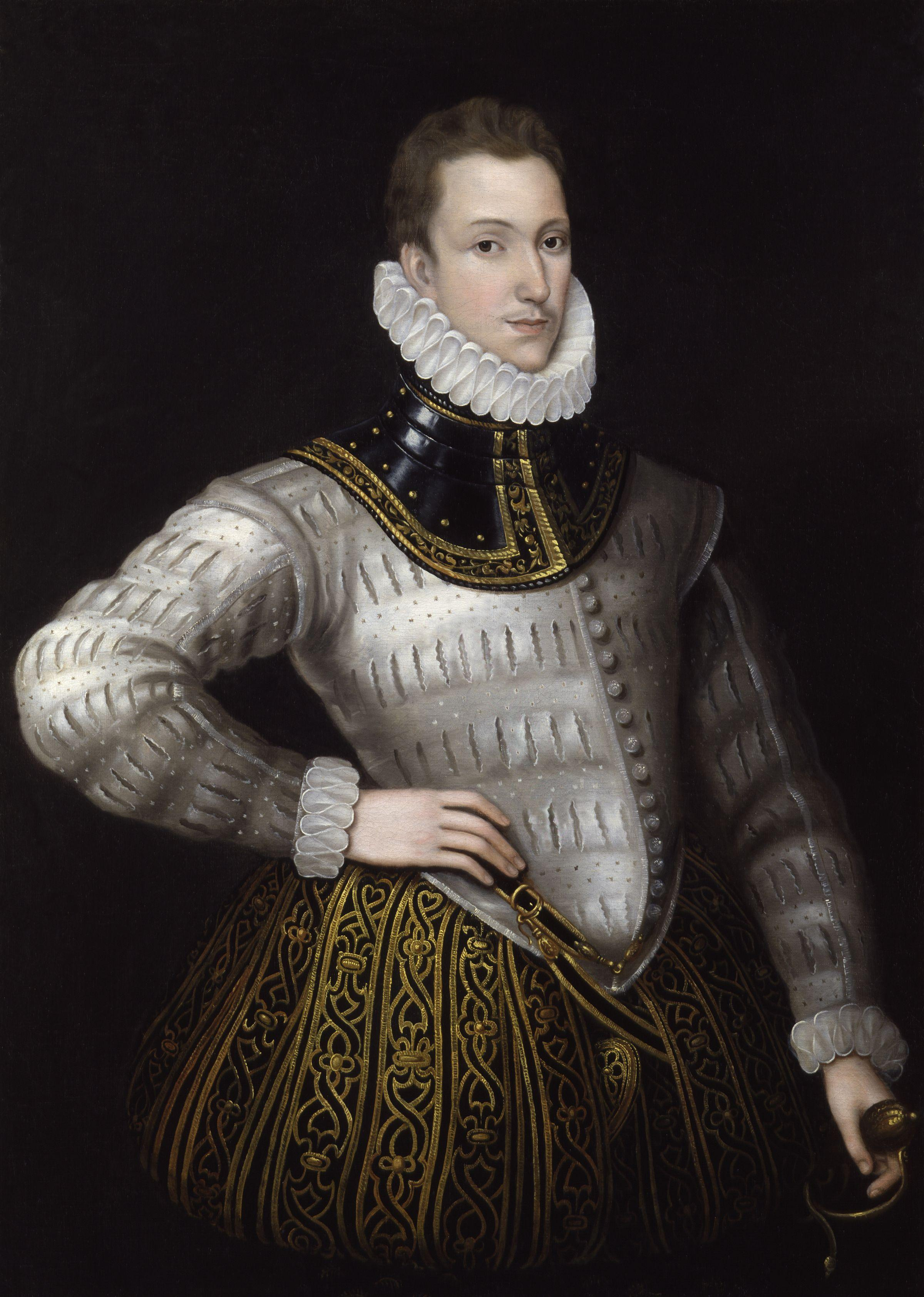
Sir Philip Sidney, former member of the school for whom a medal is named. Portrait after Antonis Mor.

The school awards a number of prizes, some of which have been running for many years; among these are:

- The Sidney Gold Medal, established 1838, is the top award Shrewsbury offers. It originally came with a purse of 50 sovereigns and was awarded to the top classicist going on to Oxbridge. The Trustees commissioned Sir Edward Thomason to cut the original die, and the image was based on a miniature painted by George Perfect Harding and owned by Dr Kennedy, now in the School collection. The medal was discontinued in 1855 when the stocks were exhausted, but was revived again in 1899. In 1980 the Salopian Club decided that the Medal should be open to all disciplines and not purely the Classics. Since that time the majority of recipients have excelled in the sciences.
- The Arnold Haggar Prize, established 1890, original known as "The Mathematics Prize", an almost unbroken run of the annual competition paper stretches back to 1890, making it one of the longest continually-run mathematics competitions in the country.
- The Bentley Elocution Prize, established 1867: candidates are required to recite a poem of at least sonnet length; introduced by Thomas Bentley, whose career at the School spanned more than 50 years. Past winners include Sir Michael Palin.
- Richard Hillary Essay Prize, established 2013, based on the single-word essay formula used for admission at All Souls College, Oxford.
- The Miles Clark Travel Award, established 1994, recipients of this award have, for instance, cycled around the world for over four years, cycled back to the UK from Siberia, and cycled by tandem from the north coast of Canada to Tierra del Fuego – a number of accounts of these travels have been published.

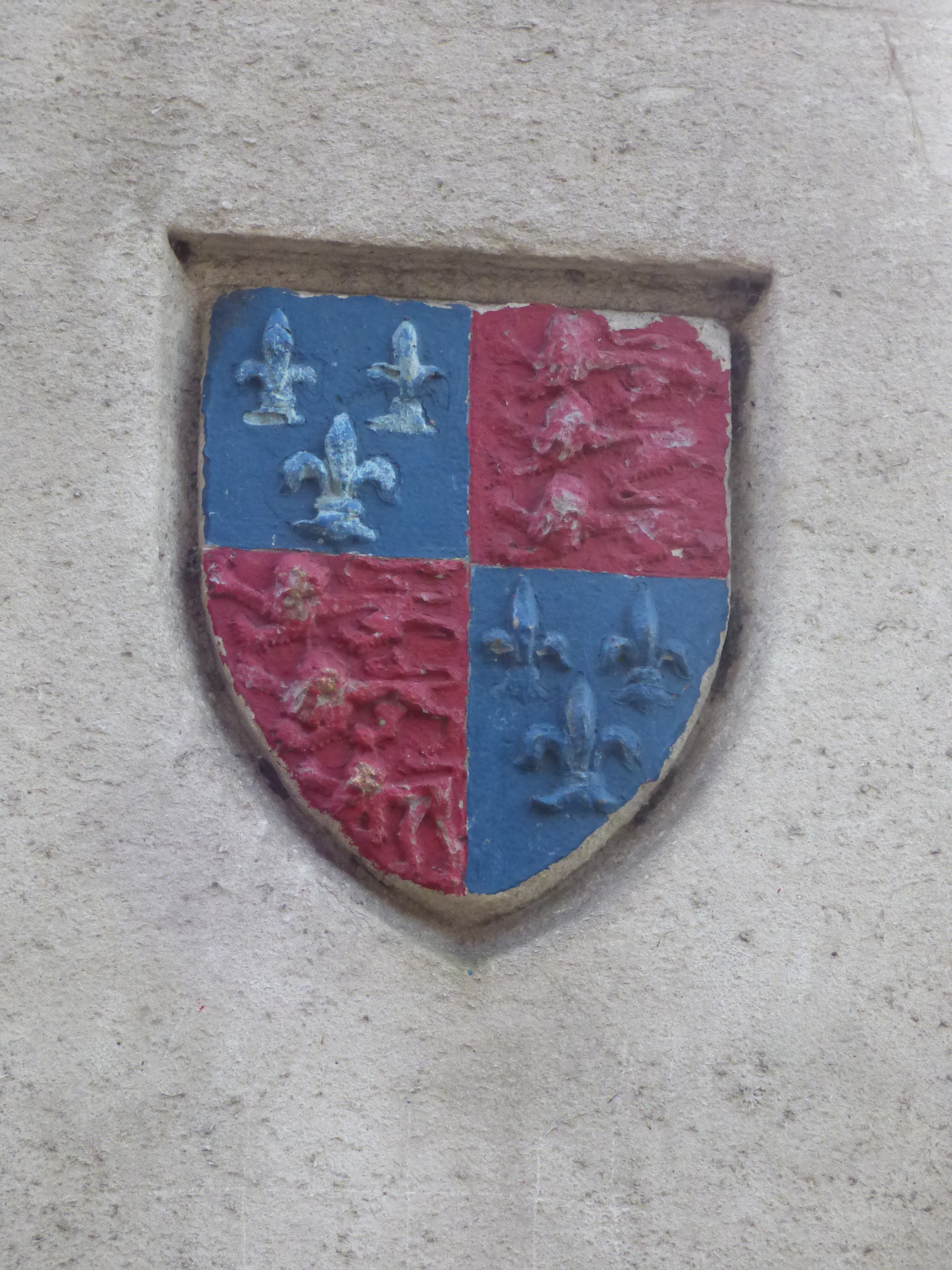
The school's arms on the high cross in the town

== Coat of arms and flag ==
The Arms of the school are those of King Edward VI being The Arms of England (three lions passant) quartered with those of France (fleur-de-lys).

As a banner of arms, this is also used as the school's flag.

== Royal visits ==
The following royal visits have been made to Shrewsbury School:

- The Duchess of Kent and Princess Victoria visited the school on 1 November 1832; they were guests of Lord Liverpool at Pitchford Hall for the visit.
- Princess Louise, visited the school for coffee on 19 January 1898.
- HRH the Duke of Teck (later Marquess of Cambridge) on 11 May 1911
- George V visited the town of Shrewsbury in 1914, and laid a foundation at the school for a new library by electrical switch from the town's square.
- The future Edward VIII, then Prince of Wales, visited in 1932 to celebrate the Jubilee of the school's move to the Kingsland site.
- Queen Elizabeth II and Prince Philip, Duke of Edinburgh visited the school to celebrate its 400-year anniversary of foundation in 1952.
- The Princess Royal opened the new Shrewsbury School Club, called the Shewsy, in Everton in 1974.
- Princess Margaret, in 1984, while officially visiting a new library in the town, lunched at the school and had a look at the new Art school.
- The Queen Mother came to Kingsland Hall during the headmastership of Donald Wright in the 1990s.
- King Charles III when Prince of Wales opened the new music school in 2001.

== Praepostors ==
The schools' prefects are known as præpostors. The word originally referred to a monastic prior and is late Latin of the Middle Ages, derived from classical Latin praepositus, "placed before".The use of praepostor in the context of a school is derived from the practice of using older boys to lead or control the younger boys. Privileges associated with the office are a particular tie showing the school's arms and the right to cycle a bike to lessons. Defining the role in 1821, Dr Butler wrote:

"A præpostor is one of the first eight boys to whom the master delegates a certain share of authority, in whom he reposes confidence, and whose business it is to keep the boys in order, to prevent all kinds of mischief and impropriety..."

== Awards ==
House and school ties and scarfs are awarded achievements in co-curricular activities.

== Scholarships, exhibitions and bursary support ==
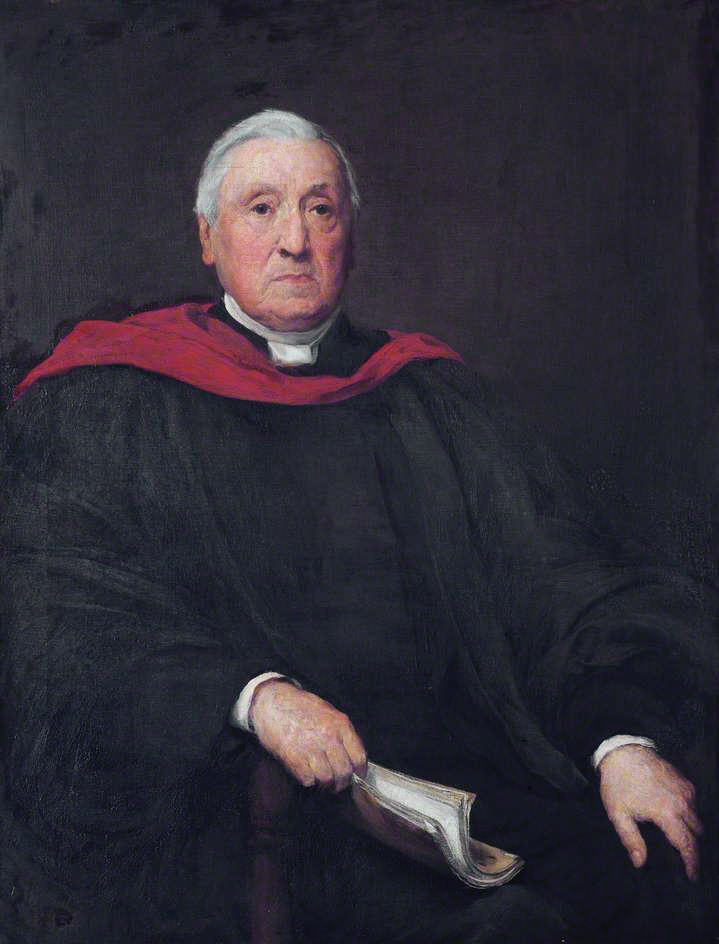
Benjamin Hall Kennedy, headmaster of Shrewsbury for thirty years, from 1836 to 1866

The school currently awards around £4 million in fee remissions. Various measures of financial assistance are available to students associated with need and with ability, as set out below:

=== Academic scholarships ===
- Four Butler Scholarships (up to 30% of fees)
- Six Kennedy and Moss Scholarships (up to 20% of fees)
- Seven Alington Scholarships (at least £2,000 per year)

=== Art scholarships ===
Art scholarships are awarded annually, most of which carry a fee remission of 10%, and larger awards are sometimes made.

=== Music scholarships ===
Music scholarships are awarded each year, worth up to 30% of the fees and the scholars receive free music tuition on two instruments.

=== All-Rounder Scholarships ===
A small number of Sir Michael Palin All-Rounder Scholarships are awarded each year.

=== Other scholarships and bursaries ===
Scholarship awards are also made for drama, sport, and design and technology, and sixth-form scholarships are also available. Bursary support grants are also available.

== Ancient library ==
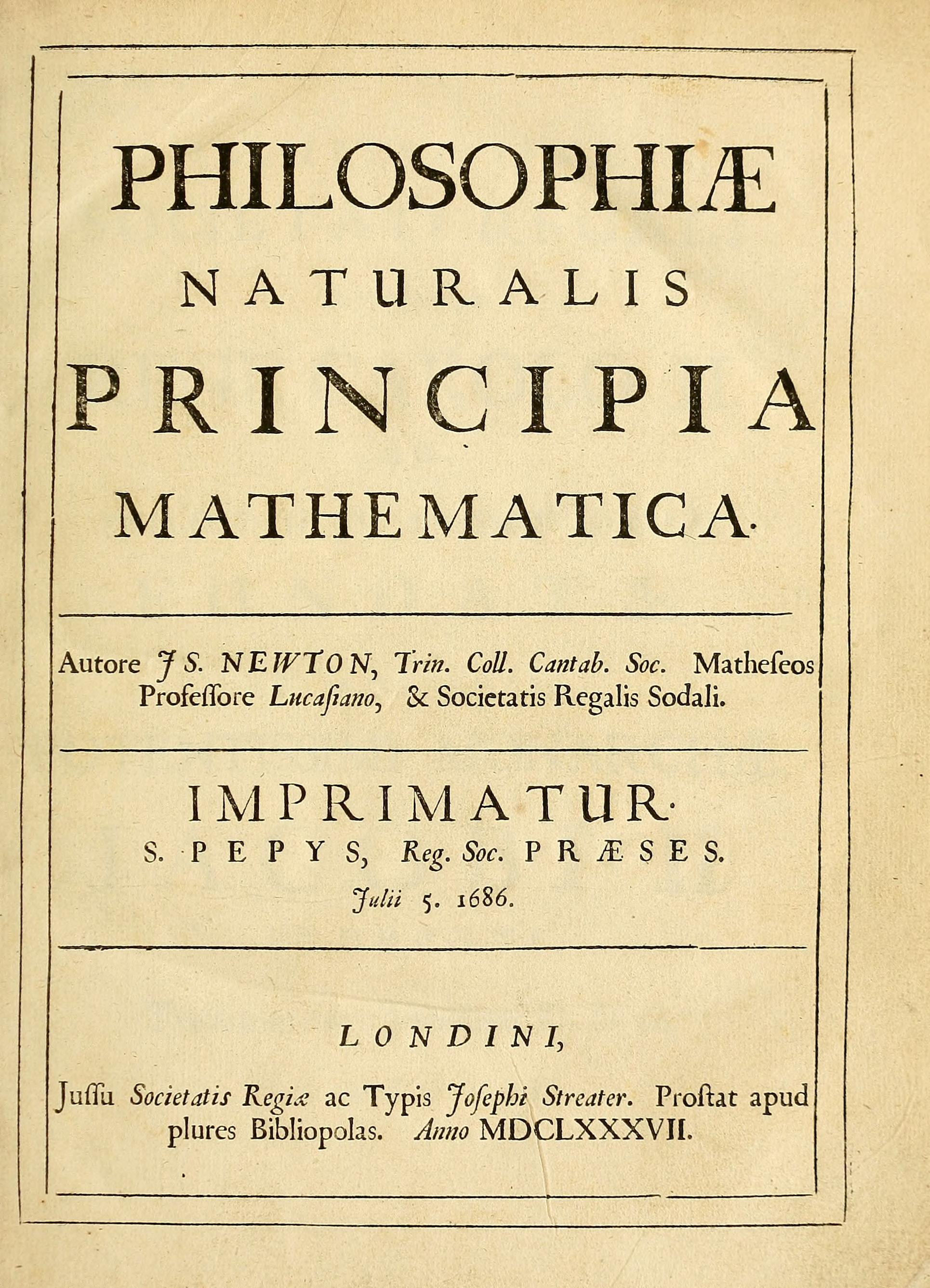
The school's Ancient Library contains a first edition of Sir Isaac Newton's Principia, acquired on publication.

The school has an ancient library, containing various significant antiquarian books and other items.

The collection includes:

- Charles Darwin's school atlas, along with books, manuscripts and letters
- Newton's Principia, acquired on publication in 1687
- Some forty medieval manuscripts, including a fine twelfth-century Gradual from Haughmond Abbey near Shrewsbury, and the Lichfield Processional with its unique liturgical English plays of circa 1430 and polyphonic music
- A death mask of Oliver Cromwell
- A first edition of the King James Bible
- 1534 Tyndale Bible
- A French Geneva Bible

== Art collection ==
The Moser Gallery, within the library buildings, contains part of the school's collection of paintings.

This includes work by J. M. W Turner, important nineteenth-century watercolours, and work by alumnus Kyffin Williams.

== Co-curricular and extension ==
=== Visiting speakers ===
Past guest speakers hosted at the school include:

- Sir Arthur Conan Doyle
- AC Grayling
- Hilaire Belloc
- Donald Coggan when Archbishop of Canterbury
- Lord Hague
- Lord Heseltine
- Lord Hennessy
- Lord Hutton
- Lord Hurd
- Oleg Gordievsky
- Omar Beckles
- Sir Colin McColl
- Aidan Hartley.
- Will Gompertz

=== Societies ===
There are dozens of organisations known as 'societies', in many of which pupils come together to discuss a particular topic or to listen to a lecture, presided over by a senior pupil, and often including a guest speaker, they are largely run by the students.

Those in existence at present include:

- Archery
- Art & Photography
- Bastille Society (history)
- Beekeeping
- Canoe and Kayak Club
- Chinese
- Christian Forum
- Coding
- Comedy
- Cooking
- Craft and Textiles Club
- Creative Writing Society
- Darwin Society (Science)
- Debating Society
- Drama
- French
- Heseltine Society
- Junior History Society
- Maths Club
- Mindfulness
- Model Railway Society
- Model United Nations
- Paired Reading Society (students visit a local primary school, where they work with younger children on a one-to-one basis in order to help develop their reading skills).
- Pilates
- Quizzing
- Reading
- Royal Shrewsbury School Shooting Club
- Sidney Society (literature)
- Spanish Society
- STEM
- Technical Theatre

There is also a Combined Cadet Force.

== Headmasters ==
- 2018– : Leo Winkley
- 2010–18: Mark Turner
- 2001–10: Jeremy W. R. Goulding
- 1988–2001: Ted Maidment
- 1981–88: Simon J. B. Langdale
- 1975–80: Sir Eric Anderson
- 1963–75: A. R. D. Wright
- 1950–63: John "Jock" Magnus Peterson
- 1944–50: John Wolfenden, Baron Wolfenden
- 1932–44: Henry Harrison Hardy (father of the actor Robert Hardy)
- 1917–32: Harold A. P. Sawyer
- 1908–17: Dr Cyril Argentine Alington
- 1866–1908: Revd. Henry Whitehead Moss
- 1836–65: Revd. Benjamin Hall Kennedy
- 1798–1836: Dr Samuel Butler (afterwards Bishop of Lichfield)
- 1771–98: Revd. J. Atcherley
- 1754–70: Charles Newling
- 1735–54: Leonard Hotchkiss
- 1727–35: Robert Phillips
- 1723–27: Revd. H. Owen
- 1687–1723: Revd. R. Lloyd
- ?1646–87: Revd. A. Taylor
- 1645–62: Thomas Pigott (deprived under Act of Uniformity)
- 1637–45: Revd. Thomas Chaloner (expelled by Parliamentarians, died 1664)
- 1583–1635: John Meighen
- 1571–83: T. Lawrence
- 1561–71: Thomas Ashton
- 1552-? John Eyton
- 1552-? Sir Morys

== Notable masters ==
- Nick Bevan, housemaster, rowing coach, later headmaster of Shiplake College
- Anthony Chenevix-Trench, housemaster of School House, later headmaster of Bradfield College, Eton College and Fettes College
- Sir William Gladstone, 7th Baronet, teacher and officer
- Michael Hoban, assistant master, classics teacher, later headmaster of Bradfield College, St Edmund's School, Canterbury and Harrow School
- The Reverend Monsignor Ronald Knox, English Catholic priest, theologian, author and broadcaster
- Frank McEachran, model for the character of the schoolmaster Hector in Alan Bennett's The History Boys
- David Profumo, 6th Baron Profumo, teacher and novelist

== Affiliate schools ==
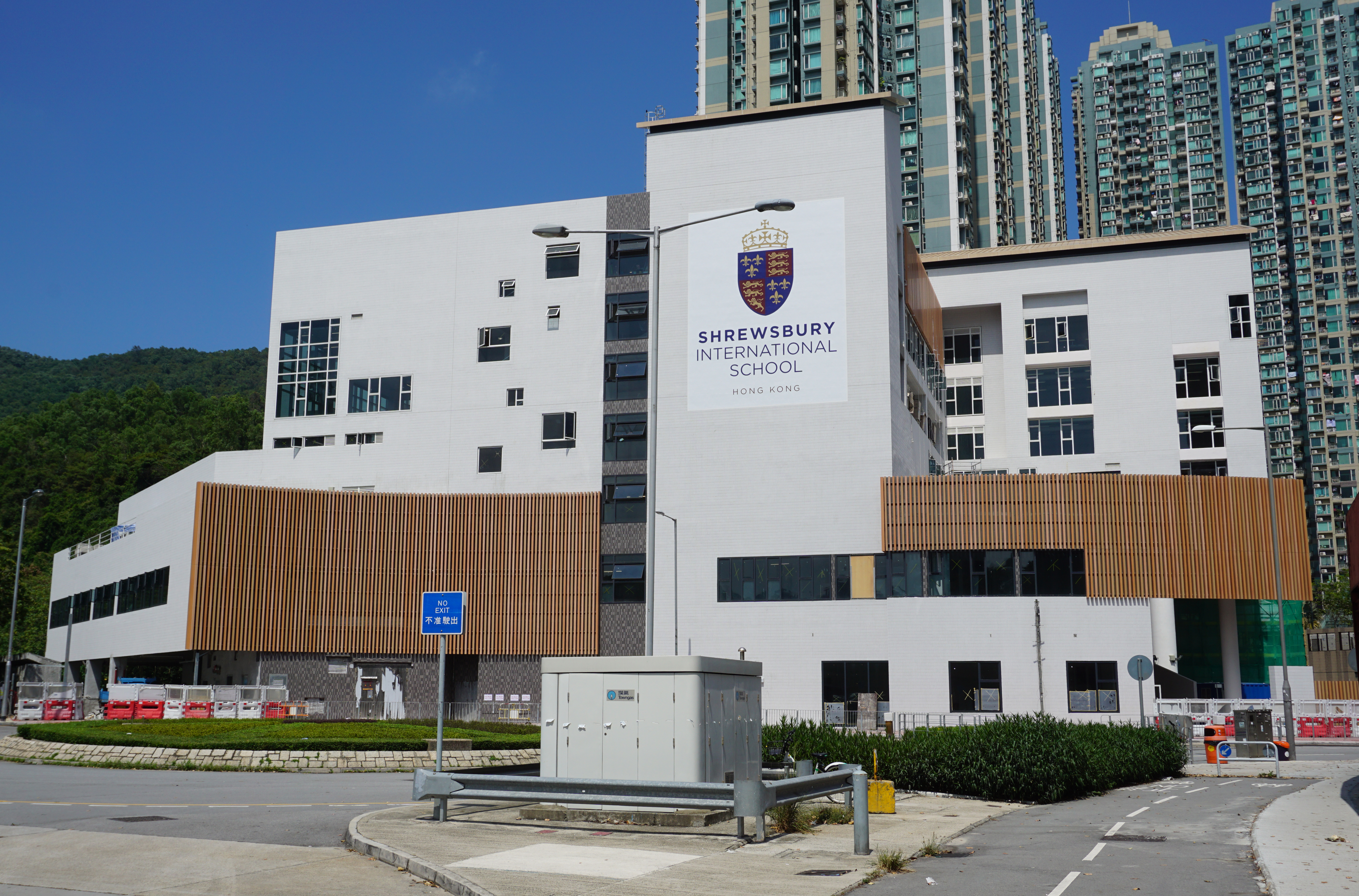
Exterior of Shrewsbury International School Hong Kong

Shrewsbury has the following affiliate schools:

- Shrewsbury International School, Bangkok, located on the banks of the Chao Phraya River, opened 2003 with 1,736 students
- Shrewsbury International School, Bangkok, City Campus, established in 2018, a feeder school for Riverside campus
- Shrewsbury International School, Hong Kong, opened 2018
- Shrewsbury International School, Phnom Penh, Cambodia, opened in 2022
- Packwood Haugh School, a Shropshire Preparatory School which united with Shrewsbury School in 2019

== Fees and admission ==
Pupils are admitted at the age of 13 by selective examination, and for approximately ten per cent of the pupils, English is a second or additional language. The fees at Shrewsbury are up to £15,194 a term for UK boarding students and up to £16,004 a term for international boarding students, with three terms per academic year in 2023/24.

== Notable alumni ==
Former pupils are referred to as Old Salopians (from the old name for Shropshire).

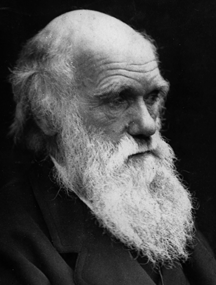
Charles Darwin, naturalist

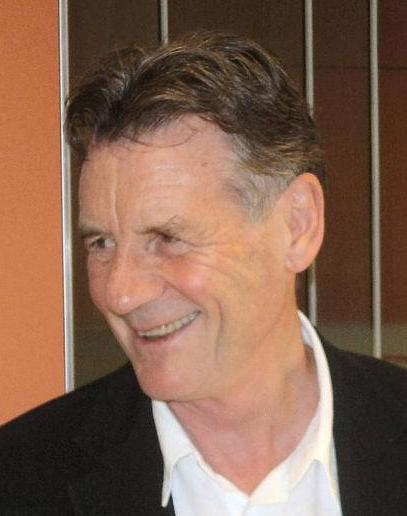
Michael Palin, member of Monty Python

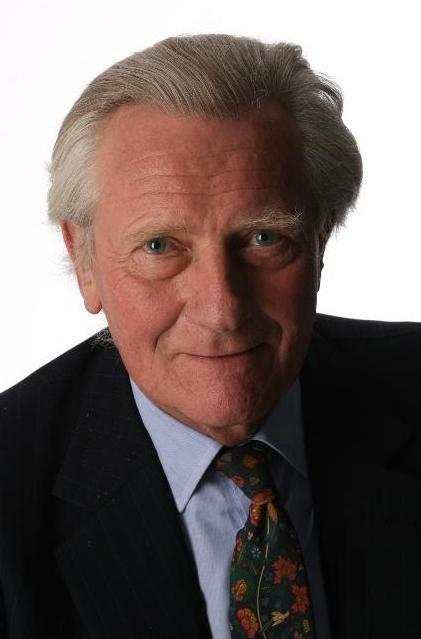
Michael Heseltine, former Deputy Prime Minister

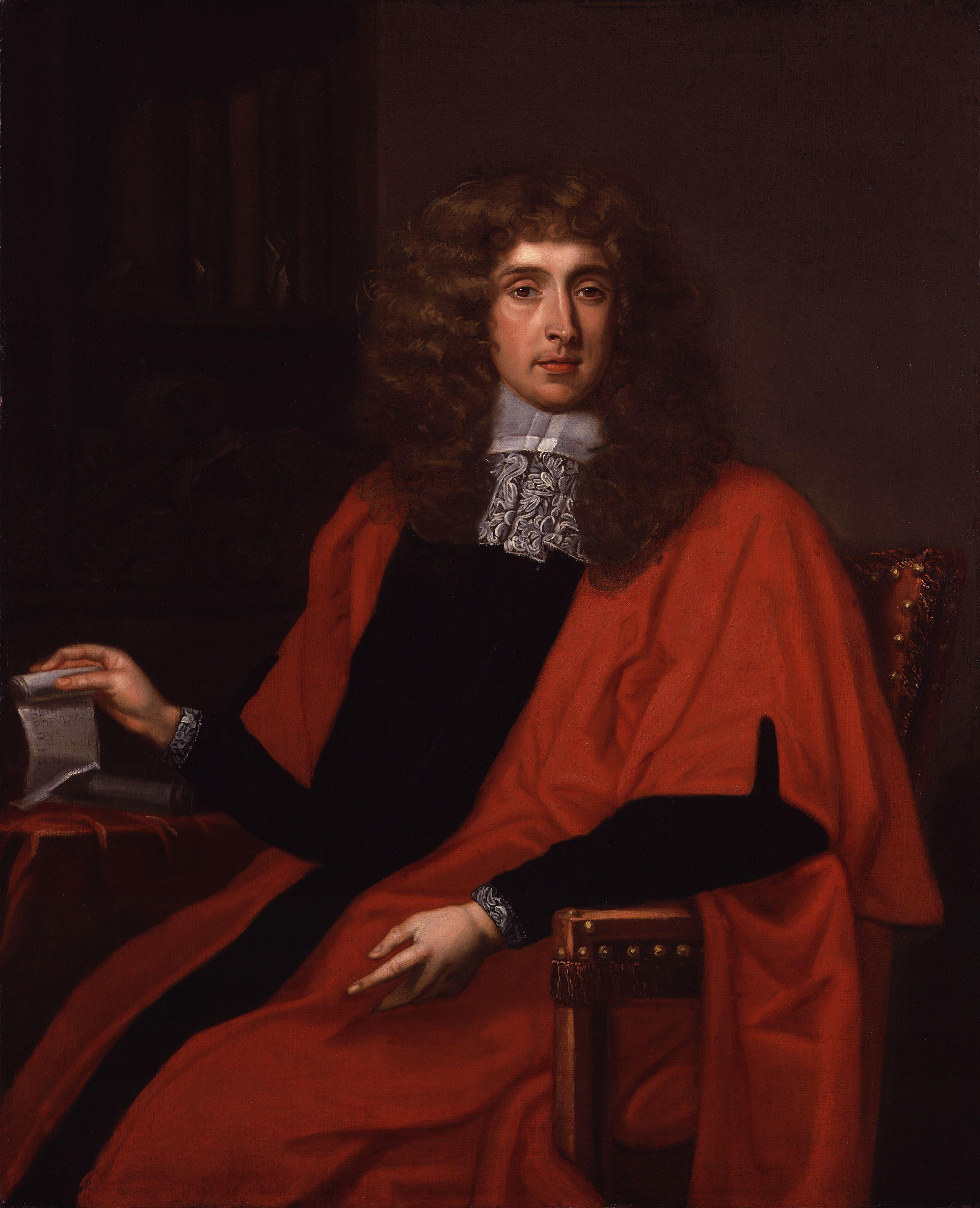
George Jeffreys, 1st Baron Jeffreys of Wem, better known as Judge Jeffrey

=== Contemporary Old Salopians ===
1930s

- Sir William Adams (1932–2020), ambassador to Tunisia 1984–87 and Egypt 1987–92
- Christopher Booker (1937–2019), journalist, founder of Private Eye
- Peter Brown (born 1935), historian of Late Antiquity and Fellow of All Souls College, Oxford
- Paul Foot (1937–2004), journalist
- Perry Henzell (1936–2006), Jamaican film director
- Michael Heseltine, Baron Heseltine (born 1933), politician and Deputy Prime Minister
- Brian Hutton, Baron Hutton (born 1931), Law Lord, Lord Chief Justice of Northern Ireland and Chairman of Hutton Inquiry
- Christopher Gill (born 1936), politician
- Richard Ingrams (born 1937), journalist, founder of Private Eye
- Sir Colin Hugh Verel McColl (born 1932), head of the Secret Intelligence Service (MI6)
- Julian Orchard (1930–1979), actor
- Air Marshal Sir Michael Simmons (born 1937), Royal Air Force Officer, Assistant Chief of the Air Staff
- John Peel (1939–2004), broadcaster

1940s

- Richard Best, Baron Best (born 1945), politician
- Piers Brendon (born 1940), writer
- Major General Sir Robert John Swan Corbett (born 1940), Commandant of the British Sector in Berlin 1987–90
- Athel Cornish-Bowden (born 1943), biochemist
- Sir Peter Davis (born 1941), businessman and chairman of Sainsbury's
- Martin Ferguson Smith (born 1941), scholar, writer and Classics and Ancient History professor at Durham
- Edward Foljambe, 5th Earl of Liverpool (born 1944), Conservative politician and peer
- Robin Hodgson, Baron Hodgson of Astley Abbotts (born 1942), politician and life peer
- Stephen Jessel (1942–2025), BBC correspondent
- David Lamb, 3rd Baron Rochester (born 1944), nobleman
- David Lovell Burbidge (born 1943), High Sheriff of the West Midlands County 1990–91
- Christopher MacLehose (born 1940), publisher
- Terry Milewski (born 1949), journalist
- Sir Mark Moody-Stuart (born 1940), ex-chairman of Royal Dutch Shell and Chairman of the UN Global Compact committee
- Nick Owen (born 1947), TV presenter
- Sir Michael Palin (born 1943), actor and TV presenter
- Richard Passingham (born 1943), neurologist
- Sir Nicholas Penny (born 1949), art historian, Director of the National Gallery
- Martin Rees, Baron Rees of Ludlow (born 1942), Astronomer Royal, erstwhile Master of Trinity College, Cambridge, ex-President of Royal Society
- Clyde Sanger (1928–2022), journalist and author, first Africa correspondent for The Guardian
- Sir John Stuttard (born 1945), Alderman and Lord Mayor of the City of London 2006–07
- Sir Francis John Badcock Sykes, 10th Baronet (born 1942), businessman
- Thomas Townley Macan (born 1946), Governor and Commander-in-Chief of the British Virgin Islands
- Sir Roderic Victor Llewellyn, 5th Baronet (born 1947), author
- Lieutenant General Sir Christopher Wallace (1943–2016), Commandant Royal College of Defence Studies
- Selby Whittingham (born 1941), art expert
- Sir James William Vernon, 5th Baronet (born 1949), landowner and accountant
- Sir Stephen Wright (born 1946), diplomat, Under-Secretary at the Foreign and Commonwealth Office, Ambassador to Spain

1950s

- Christopher Beazley (born 1952), Member of the European Parliament 1984–2009
- Bruce Clark (born 1958), author and International Security Editor of The Times
- Stephen Glover (born 1952), journalist and columnist
- Timothy Edward Lamb (born 1959), cricketer and sports administrator
- Sir John Auld Mactaggart, 4th Baronet (born 1951), entrepreneur and philanthropist
- Jonathan Peter Marland, Baron Marland (born 1956), Treasurer of the Conservative Party
- Sir Andrew McFarlane (born 1954), Lord Justice of Appeal in England and Wales
- Sir Philip Montgomery Campbell (born 1951), astrophysicist and editor-in-chief of Nature
- Michael Proctor (born 1950), academic and Provost of King's College, Cambridge
- Nicholas Rankin (born 1950), writer and broadcaster
- Johnathan Ryle (born 1952), writer, anthropologist and professor at Bard College
- Desmond Shawe-Taylor (born 1955), art historian, Surveyor of the Queen's Pictures
- Jonathon Shawe-Taylor (born 1953), Director of the Centre for Computational Statistics and Machine Learning at University College, London

1960s

- Simon Baynes (born 1960), politician
- Andrew Berry (born 1963), biologist and lecturer of Organismic and Evolutionary Biology at Harvard
- Tim Booth (born 1960), musician
- Charles A. Foster (born 1962), writer, philosopher, barrister, veterinarian, and Fellow of Exeter College, Oxford
- Nick Hancock (born 1962), actor and TV presenter
- John Humphrey Arnott Pakington, 7th Baron Hampton (born 1964), landowner and photographer
- Vice Admiral Sir Clive Johnstone (born 1961), Royal Navy officer and former Commander of the Allied Maritime Command
- Jonathan Legard (born 1961), journalist and broadcaster
- Jonathan Lord (born 1962), politician
- Twm Morys (born 1961), poet and musician.
- Mark Oakley (born 1968), Dean of Southwark Cathedral, formerly Canon Chancellor of St. Paul's Cathedral and Dean of St John's College, Cambridge
- Angus Pollock (born 1962), cricketer for Cambridge University Cricket Club
- Simon Shackleton (born 1968), DJ, musician
- James St Clair Wade (born 1962), architect
- Martin Wainwright (born 1960), journalist and author

1970s

- Charles Robertson-Adams (born 1976), athlete
- Christopher Hope (born 1972), journalist, political editor of The Daily Telegraph
- Alastair Humphreys (born 1976), adventurer and author

1980s

- Prince Omar Ali Bolkiah (born 1986), Bruneian royal
- Alexander Orlando Bridgeman, Viscount Newport (born 1980), businessman and landowner
- Freddie Fisher (born 1985), actor
- Richard Goulding (born 1980), actor
- Anthony Mangnall (born 1989), MP for Totnes
- Ian Massey (born 1985), cricketer, Cambridge MCCU and Herefordshire
- Joshua Sasse (born 1987), actor
- Will Tudor (born 1987), actor

1990s

- Ed Barnard (born 1995), Warwickshire cricketer
- Joe Leach (born 1990), Worcestershire cricketer
- David Lloyd (born 1992), Glamorgan cricketer
- Claas Mertens (born 1992), German rower
- Ed Pollock (born 1995), Worcestershire cricketer
- Ruaidhri Smith (born 1994), Glamorgan and Scotland cricketer
- James Taylor (born 1990), Leicestershire, Nottinghamshire and England cricketer

2000s

- Issy Wong (born 2002), Warwickshire, Central Sparks, Birmingham Phoenix, Mumbai Indians and England cricketer
- Theo Wylie (born 2006), Warwickshire cricketer

=== Victoria Cross holders ===
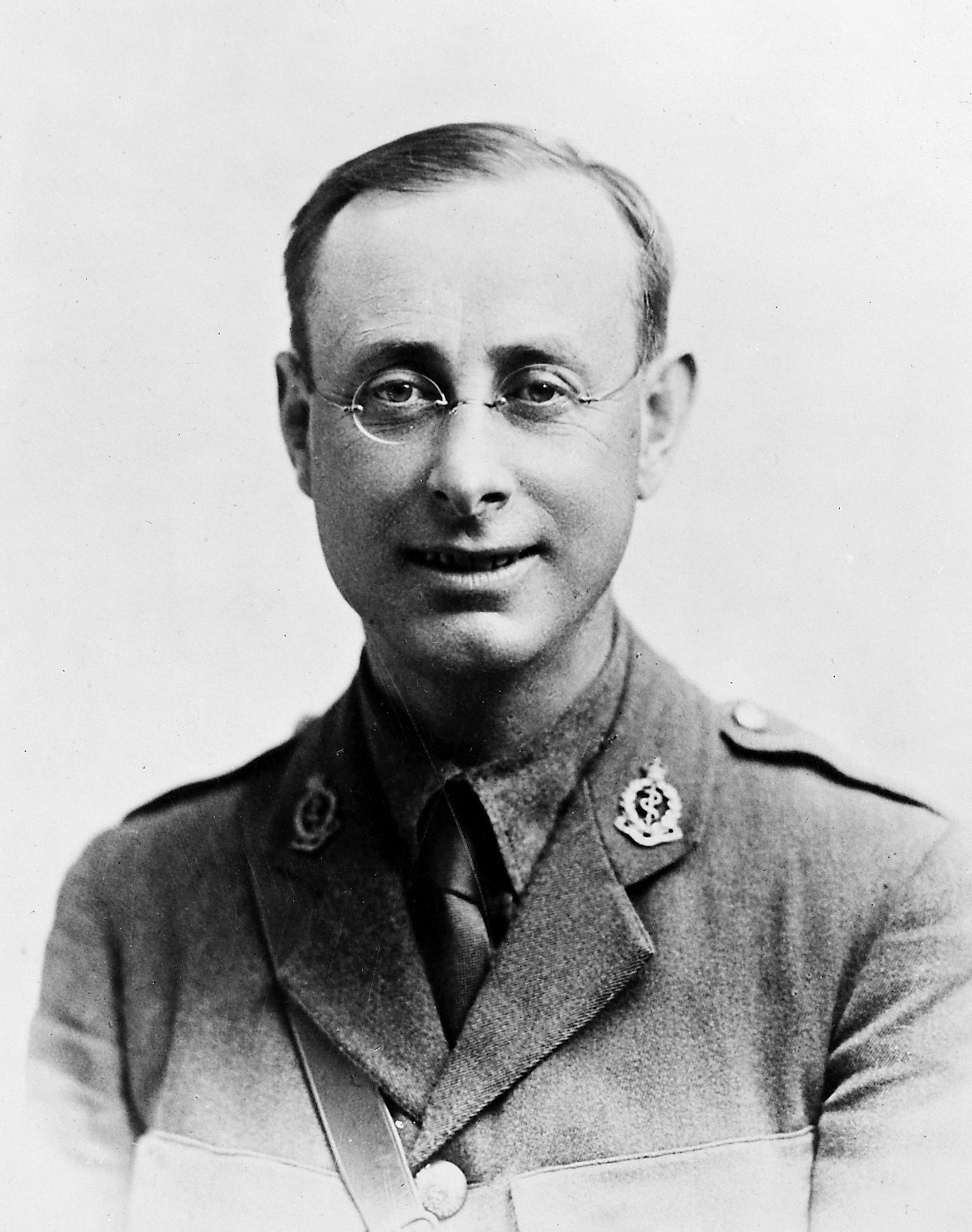
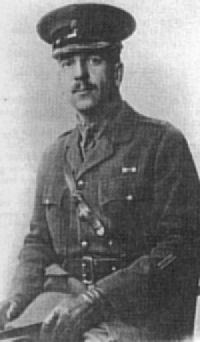
Harold Ackroyd and Thomas Tannatt Pryce, two former members of the school awarded the Victoria Cross

Two Old Salopians received the Victoria Cross, both in the First World War, 1914–18.

- Thomas Tannatt Pryce
- Harold Ackroyd

=== Old Salopian activities ===
The "Old Salopian Club", now known as the Salopian Club, was founded in 1886. A number of reunions, clubs and activities are arranged by the club. The post nominals OS are used to denote Old Salopians.

==== Sports ====
Former members of the school have various sporting clubs:

- Rowing is arranged by the "Sabrina Club", which fields crews, including for Henley Royal Regatta as well as supporting the school crews at various events
- Cricket is arranged by the "Saracens"
- Old Salopian golf, yachting, fives cross country, tennis, football, squash and basketball are also provided for.

==== Careers, arts and activities ====
Arrangements for cultural engagement of former members if the school, for instance concerts and plays and art exhibitions are also put on, and there is a programme around careers.

== Social action ==
=== Shrewsbury House ===
A mission in Everton, Liverpool, called "Shrewsbury House" was established in 1903. It is less formally known as "the Shrewsy" and is a youth and community centre associated with St Peter's Church Everton. Michael Heseltine was first introduced to social issues in Liverpool which the took up in the 1980s at this mission.

=== Medic Malawi ===
The charity Medic Malawi, which includes a hospital, two orphanages and The Shrewsbury School Eye Clinic has an ongoing relationships and support from the school community.

=== Other activities ===
During the coronavirus pandemic of 2020 the school donated over 1,600 items of personal protective equipment to the NHS, including face shields it had 3D printed in its technology labs. It also opened up rooms in its boarding houses for the use of NHS staff.

== Steam locomotive ==
One of the Southern Railway, Class V, Schools Class 4-4-0 locomotives designed by Maunsell and built at Eastleigh and was named "Shrewsbury". Its SR number was 921 and its BR number was 30921. It entered service in 1934 and it was withdrawn in 1962 from use on railways. A name plate (one of two) is preserved in the Admissions Offices/Registry of the school.

== Farm house ==
The school maintains a farmhouse at Talargerwyn in Snowdonia. This is used for outward-bound type activities and research trips.

== Controversy ==
In September 2005, the school was one of fifty independent schools operating independent school fee-fixing, in breach of the Competition Act, 1998. All of the schools involved were ordered to abandon this practice, pay a nominal penalty of £10,000 each and to make ex-gratia payments totalling three million pounds into a trust designed to benefit pupils who attended the schools during the period in respect of which fee information had been shared.

== See also ==
- Listed buildings in Shrewsbury (outer areas)

== Bibliography ==
- Carr, A. M., and T. Fullman (1983). Shrewsbury Library: Its History and Restoration. Shropshire Libraries.
- Stewart, Alan (2000). Philip Sidney: A Double Life. Chatto and Windus. ISBN 0-7011-6859-5.
