= James Wade (disambiguation) =

James Wade (born 1983) is an English darts player

James, Jamie, Jim or Jimmy Wade may also refer to:

- James Wade (basketball) (born 1975), American-French basketball coach
- James F. Wade (1843–1921), Spanish-American War general
- James P. Wade (1930-2017), author, with Harlan K. Ullman, of the doctrine of strategic dominance, more popularly known as shock and awe
- James St Clair Wade, British architect
- Jamie Wade (born 1981), English cricketer
- Jim Wade (1925–2019), American football player
- Jimmy Wade (c.1895–1957), American jazz trumpeter and bandleader
- Jim Wade (discus thrower) (born 1940), American discus thrower, 1960 NCAA runner-up for the USC Trojans track and field team
