= Mimicking operations =

Mimicking operations is a tactical concept, developed under Terrorist Tactics, Techniques, and Procedures, to explain a form of deception, commonly used by terrorists in their attacks. The concept is commonly used in military tactical modelling and scientific simulation; and is connected to the idea of shielding friendly forces (as well as foes) from detection and deception.

== Definition ==
Mimicking operations is a – "cost-effective way of achieving a desired operational effect using superior deception tactics to exploit concealment and camouflage opportunities".

== Relationship with military deception operations ==
Carlo Kopp identified in 2002 that 'deception and Mimicry is the insertion of intentionally misleading information. It amounts to mimicking a known signal so well, that a receiver cannot distinguish the phony signal from the real signal.'

== Relationship with Fifth Dimension Operations ==
The mimicking operations concept was acknowledged as an early iteration of contemporary Fifth Dimension Operations.

== Use of examples from nature ==
The concept of mimicking operations simulates activity that resembles a bacterial attack on a large and complex organism. Attacking cells mimic the behavior of their victims, but remain dormant while awaiting an opportunity to launch an attack. The development of mimicking operations has been influenced by biology, ecology and the workings of the natural world.

- A species evolves the appearance of another to aid its survival.
- Animals or insects develop a physical similarity to their predators, in order to avoid danger.
- Portia spiders strum the webs of other spiders to imitate mating behaviors or the actions of distressed prey.

== Military tactics use ==
In military tactics, the employment of mimicking operational strategies, is based on concepts:

- A potential target is given confusing information and is encouraged to walk into what appears to be a safe situation.
- The use of mimicry manipulates information through the simulation of behavior or of physical appearance.
- Mimicking operations represents an increasingly cost-effective way of achieving a desired operational effect using superior information to exploit concealment, deception and imitation techniques.

== Mimicking operations as a subset of military deception ==
Mimicking Operations is a subset of military deception. From a logistics perspective the capacity to develop a deception strategy, reflects the relative capacity of the combatant to collect the resources to develop suitable deception. In the case of terrorism, an individual with few resources is likely to adapt a mimicking strategy, and seek to camouflage themselves. Whereas a more resourced team of terrorists with the backing of an organisation may be more likely to afford the resources to develop a decoy, as part of a developed deception strategy.
