= 3D tactics analysis =

Three-dimensional (3D) tactics analysis, is a tactical analysis methodology under the concept of terrorist tactics, techniques, and procedures, and is related to the rhizome manoeuvre. The approach is applicable to urban combat, and takes into account mass gatherings of people located in highly complex urban structures, incorporating features such as multi-level buildings, open spaces between buildings, crowd congregation points, and transport hubs.

== Definition ==
3D tactics are defined as "tactics in the third dimension which is the space above and below ground level in land and urban operations".

== Historical concepts ==
Giuseppe Fioravanzo defined the concept of 3D tactics in naval warfare history.

== Key concepts ==
The notion of 3D tactics has been developed from the spherical security concept. The 3D tactics model identifies some of the key phenomenon experienced in urban environments. In particular, the "inherent information deception qualities" found in "vertical rather than horizontal envelopment". A key aspect, in urban tactics, is the importance in achieving, what is called "spherical security", that is, the three-dimensional nature of the urban battle places a premium on all-round security. This requires tactical thinking in three dimensions.

== Key influences in development ==
3D tactics are often represented as a cube of space within which the tactical analysis takes place:

- It includes the ground, underground and the third dimension (each building can hide enemies).
- The 3D tactics concept is also related to the notion of a three-dimensional cube which conceptually overlaid urban space.

=== Cube application ===
The 3D tactics cube is a visual tool used to define a tactical space. It incorporates conventional understanding of the third dimension in land combat - as the airspace above terrain - and the urban environment consisting of the three-dimensional solid forms of typical central business district (CBD) buildings and spaces formed between buildings. As well, the 3D tactics cube notionally conforms within 300 m^{2}, which gives coverage to most weapons effective ranges, and incorporates most CBD buildings.

=== Curtis LeMay's combat box tactics ===
The 3D tactics and tactical analysis approach is an application of the Curtis LeMay's "combat box". This was a tactical formation designed by US Army Air Force heavy (strategic) bombers during World War II. 3D illustrations were often used in the World War II period, as a means to visualize how heavy bomber formations would defend themselves against enemy interceptors in the absence of escorting fighters, by providing interlocking fire from each of the planes operating in mutual support.

== Modification of swarming tactics ==
Swarming tactics have been identified as operating within a 3D tactics paradigm. 3D tactics analysis in relation to swarming tactics examines how swarming by multiple entities can attack a target from multiple directions, and building levels (above and below ground) within an urban area. Understanding this tactical behavior, and why it is able to succeed requires an analysis of two key concepts:

- Information warfare
- Command and influence relationships (as a component of military C2 "command and control").

== Related concepts ==
There are several concepts that are related the 3D tactical analysis approach:

- Airspace battles
- Simultaneous tactical actions

=== Simultaneous tactical actions ===
3D tactical analysis has its origins in Richard Simpkin's concept of simultaneous tactical actions. In summary, Simpkin:

- Made a distinction between conventional land-based tactics articulated along a staged -sequential set of actions, where what can be seen within the line-of-weapon's sight, follows movement.
- Simpkin also identified a more complex level of tactics, conducted not as a sequence of actions, but occurring as a barrage of continuous simultaneous actions.

Simpkin 'originally proposed this, as multiple simultaneous manoeuvre and fire-directed attacks at an opponent in order to overwhelm them'.

=== Airspace battle ===
Tactical consideration of the immediate airspace above the surface has been significant in further contributing to the concept of 3D tactical analysis; in particular:

- Combining the spherical security concept with Simpkin's concept of simultaneous tactical has developed a focus on "area analyses".

This has been described as "considering the three-dimensional situational awareness of the local friendly airspace in battle management". And, in this particular formulation of the tactical paradigm (represented by 3D tactical analysis), the entire space surrounding a position or target in warfare is subject to continuous simultaneous examination.

== Geographic information system methodology ==
Geographic information system (GIS) approaches have been significant in recent times influencing the development and conceptualization of 3D tactical analysis. This has been described as a "look-around" approach to thinking tactically in three dimensions, and accommodating the full complexity of multidimensional environments. In effect, this is to look vertically, horizontally and spatially at the same time, while being able to see through the confused environment – the traditional "fog of war".

== Relationship with 3D firefighting concepts ==
3D tactical analysis has been strongly influenced by fire fighters in the UK and U.S. They have developed the most coherent concept of 3D tactics called "3D fire fighting methodology".

== Relationship with fifth dimension operations ==
More recently, 3D tactics analysis has been included into the realm of fifth dimensional operations.
