= Command and influence =

Military concept

Command and influence is a component of Military C2 ('Command and control') and is a key aspect of Terrorist Tactics, Techniques, and Procedures.

== Definition ==
Chris Flaherty in 2003 distinguished the concept of command and influence is a component of Military C2 ('command and control'), in the following terms: "Influence, is fundamental to effective Command where forces manoeuvre. Thus, recognition of "Influence" is an important element in any future warfighting concept. As an alternative to relying on Command and Control (C2) based effective Command there should be utilization of command and "influence" (CI) based effective Command.

== Role of influence in military theory ==
Notionally, 'influence' is definable as the effect of one person or thing on another. In particular military information operations (IO) implicitly incorporates a variety of influence strategies, in order to shape the military and political spheres in conflict.

== Relevance of Arquilla and Ronfeldt work ==
The work of John Arquilla and David Ronfeldt, on the netwar actor, was used as the basis for developing the 'command and influence' model. In particular, their characterization of the network based organisation, as these routinely employ non-hierarchical based decision structures:

- An archetypal netwar actor consists of a web (or network) of disperse, interconnected 'nodes' (or activity centres).
- A network based organisation is structurally flat, meaning there is no single central leader or commander, and with little or no hierarchy.
- Decision making and operations are decentralized and depend on consultative consensus-building that allow for local initiative and autonomy.
- A mobilizing factor for decision making depends on a powerful doctrine, ideology, or narrative.

This later dictum clearly identifies 'Influence' as the enabling mechanism allowing actors/agents to disperse, devote to different tasks, as well as coordinate from a ground level up emulating operational centrality.

== Relationship swarming tactics ==
Swarming attackers or defenders take advantage of any happenstance they can manipulate (to their own advantage); and are able to overcome coordination barriers, as these adopt the following strategies:

- There is no discernible communication between swarming attackers (who operate completely without organisation or an apparent plan).
- Netwar organisation is described as structurally flat. There is no central leader or commander and little or no hierarchy.

== Cohesive factors ==
The key command and influence cohesive factors, are:

- Actions are independent;
- Coordinated collaboratively and consultatively;
- 'Influence' operates as the attractor and motivator for human-to-human organisation;
- The swarmers rely on broad ideologies to motivate and direct (which operate as unifying and directing precepts); and,
- The swarmers rely on opinion leaders or intermediaries, who organize, coordinate, and suggest direction.
