= Dynamic defence =

Dynamic defence, is a key concept in Rhizome Manoeuvre, and Three-Dimensional (3D) Tactics Analysis, and is a key concept in contemporary Terrorist Tactics, Techniques, and Procedures.

An “erratic assault/dynamic defence” is where one or both sides deliberately act without any plan as a means to create a chaotic situation during the battle, thereby overwhelming opponents.

Some of the key concepts underpinning dynamic defence are "deliberate erratic actions" and "attack zones"- the surfaces or spaces vulnerable to attack.

== Deliberate erratic actions ==
In military tactics, the deliberate use of "erratic action" forces an opponent subjected to hit-and-run attacks without warning to remain on constant alert and which deliberately wears them down. Examples of erratic tactics used in terrorism are where attacks are opportunistic and targets selected have only a generic relationships with the supposed political aims of the terrorists involved. The value of the attack rests in the confusion and ultimate shock value of the attack when it finally happens.

These tactics deliberately present ambiguity and are largely impossible to predict. The advantage of an 'erratic attacks' is that these constitute an omnipresent and/or invisible threat and seemingly occur randomly; there are many potential targets, and one will be chosen randomly and attacked immediately. The purpose of random selection and immediate attack is to avoid encountering any form of prepared defence.

== Attack zones ==
An attack zone is an adaptation of the concept of an attack surface which, in the world of computer security, means ‘the depth of methods a hacker can use to exploit a system’. The concept also has an historical military strategy parallel in the 1921 Turkish defence at the Sakarya River where Mustafa Kemal Atatürk instructed: “you will no longer have a line of defence, but a surface of defence.... All of Turkey shall be our surface of defence, upon which our units will resist everywhere and all the time”. Fundamentally, an 'attack zone' is conceived of as a surface or space and is constituted of the ways in which an adversary can attack a system and potentially cause damage. There are two types of attack:

- Avenue of attack: This focuses on a particular objective that is perceived to be tactically/strategically important. This type of attack is typically controlled by ‘force moderation’ and involves a deliberate process of targeting and selection.
- Zone attack: No specific targets are identified other than an attack zone containing a density of potential targets.

This situation places an attacker at a tactical advantage because defenders tend to think in terms of deliberate process of targeting and selection. The attackers do not think in terms of specific targets. This tends to result in surprise and confusion among the defenders. In particular, this unpredictability makes interdiction difficult for a defender to implement, for attackers have an innate advantage by deploying in a target rich environment and behaving erratically to achieve surprise and defeat detection using a series of rhizome manoeuvres.

== Dynamic or randomized defence ==
In order to out-compete the erratic moving attacker the defender has two options:

- Adopt a denial strategy (akin to concept of sea denial): The defender creates areas under surveillance or fire that become no-go-zones for a would-be attacker.
- Harness happenstance and coincidence: The defender begins to move themselves throughout the zone – meandering around, in order to create a situation where the attacker cannot be sure where the defender will be next and both combatants run the risk of coming across the other without warning. In this case both forces depend on having a higher state of situational awareness and the high-end military capacity to out-perform the other force when encountered.

== See also ==
- Asymmetric warfare
- Guerilla warfare
- Phalanx
- Urban warfare
