= RKB =

RKB may refer to:

- Reichs Kolonial Bund
- Responder Knowledge Base
- RKB Mainichi Broadcasting
