= Cyberwar (disambiguation) =

Cyberwarfare is warfare waged in the context of computers and electronic networks.

Cyberwar or Cyber War may also refer to:

- Cyberwar (video game)
- Cyberwar: How Russian Hackers and Trolls Helped Elect a President, a 2018 book
- Cyberwar (TV series), a Viceland documentary series
- Cyber War: The Next Threat to National Security and What to Do About It, a 2010 book by Richard A. Clarke
- Avatar (2004 film), also known as Cyber Wars

== See also ==
- Electronic warfare
- Virtual war
- Cyber Vaar – Har Screen Crime Scene, a 2022 Indian crime thriller web series
- Cyberware (disambiguation)
