= Network-enabled capability =

UK military doctrine for using information systems

Network-enabled capability, or NEC, is the name given to the United Kingdom Ministry of Defence long-term intent to achieve enhanced military effect through the better use of information systems towards the goal of "right information, right place, right time – and not too much". NEC is envisaged as the coherent integration of sensors, decision-makers, effectors and support capabilities to achieve a more flexible and responsive military. This is intended to make commanders better aware of the evolving military situation and better able to react to events through communications.

== Allied parallels ==
NEC is related to the US concept of network-centric warfare (NCW), which at the time was described as "translating an information advantage into a decisive warfighting advantage". This was later renamed "network-centric operations" (NCO), to encompass activities such as peacekeeping.

NEC is related to the Australian concept of Ubiquitous Command and Control (UC2), which includes network-enabled capability, military intent, and awareness. UC2 extends the "networking position" of NEC and NCW to include positions on decision devolution, seeking the ubiquity of available decision makers and using computing to achieve it, the necessary human-computer integration in decision making, decentralisation of intent and physical dispersion, social coordination protocols to unify intent, capability and awareness, and management levels to bound behaviours.

== See also ==
- Networked swarming warfare
- British Armed Forces
- Skynet
- Bowman
