= Rhizome manoeuvre =

Urban warfare tactic

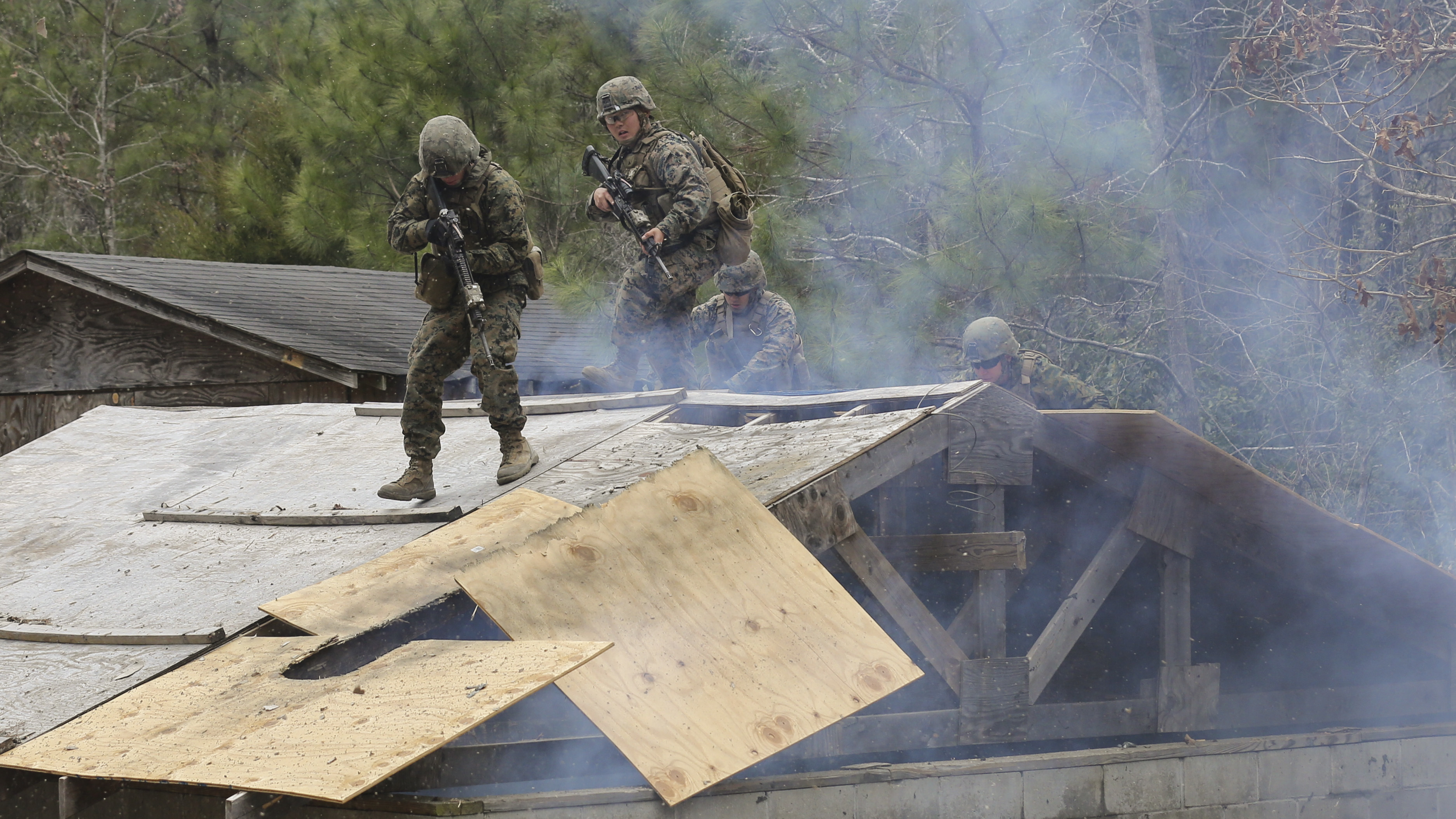
Using a rooftop as an unexpected direction of attack

A rhizome manoeuvre is a surprise attack in a built environment, made from an unexpected direction, such as through a wall or floor. It is a key concept in contemporary warfare tactics, techniques, and procedures.

The name derives from plant rhizomes, stem structures which grow horizontally underground through soil, allowing new shoots to grow upwards in other places.

== Definition ==
A rhizome manoeuvre is a combat technique, specifically designed to achieve surprise, as a tactical effect.

- It is a tactical technique used in urban combat, to effectively strike a sudden blow at the opponent from an unexpected direction.
- A rhizome manoeuvre is the application of an urban combat technique, that is performed by moving forces, and has been called a strategy of "walking through walls".
- Conceptually, it treats the built environment as a flexible, almost liquid medium, forever-in-flux.

However, the criticism of writers such as Eyal Weizman and Chris Flaherty, emphasize the realities of moving through the urban built environment executing a rhizome manoeuvre, requires a force to assemble behind walls, under floors, or overhead on rooftops (using explosives, drills or hammers if necessary) in order to break through.

== Key concepts ==
The key concepts of a rhizome manoeuvre, involve small decentralized forces:

- Moving at speed
- Through the three-dimensional urban space as if it were without walls, floors, or ceilings outside of the normal linear routes, such as streets, doors, windows, and stairs that make up buildings

In essence, a rhizome manoeuvre is movement unobserved, and unexpected, and is based on tactical concepts such as:

- Deliberate erratic actions, and erratic attacks; and,
- Dynamic defence.

== Historical origin ==
Infiltration tactics, used in World War I, by assault parties have been identified as an early development of rhizome manoeuvres. As this involved small units of troops moving toward, and through opposing trenches, through infiltration of various weak points, in order to launch surprise attacks overwhelming the defenders. During the Battle of Ortona, the Canadian Army developed a tactic known as "mouse-holing", which involved using anti-tank weapons to blast holes through walls of adjacent buildings, allowing the assaulting forces to advance through the hole into the adjacent space. In 1997, the US Army began to identify future warfare concepts, such as rhizome manoeuvres, describing: "Future land combat units will exploit terrain by maneuvering for tactical advantage within the folds and undulations of the earth's surface without suffering the restrictions imposed on mobility by contact with the ground."

=== Use by the Israel Defense Forces ===
Various applications of rhizome manoeuvres, have been developed by the Israel Defense Forces (IDF), during its operations; these have been the subject of critical analysis by Eyal Weizman, in particular his essay on lethal theory, which appeared as a chapter in his 2007 book Hollow Land: Israel's Architecture of Occupation, as "Urban Warfare: Walking Through Walls" (pp 185–221). In this work, Weizman interviewed senior IDF officers, involved in the Nablus manoeuvre (April 2002), where they described IDF tactical concepts such as rhizome manoeuvres; as well, Weizman collected accounts from civilians who experienced these events. This work, was first presented in Weizman's 2006 article "Lethal Theory".

== Application in urban combat ==
The application of rhizome maneuvering, by a combat forces has been likened to:

- The military application of free-running, such as parkour.
- The application of rhizome maneuvering by combat forces has also been situated within three-dimensional (3D) tactics analysis.

== See also ==
- Loophole (firearm)
