= Screening (tactical) =

Military tactic

Screening is a military tactic in which a "screening force" (sometimes referred to as a "security force," or "guard force") provides early warning and reconnaissance to a main force or unit. Screening units are usually smaller and more mobile than units of the main body. They also detect and harass the enemy's own screening and reconnaissance units, hide the main body’s strength and location, and delay enemy advance. Screening forces generally avoid becoming decisively engaged.

Screening may be utilized in all warfare domains; on the ground, on the sea, in the air, in space, and in cyberspace.

== Details ==
Screening forces are generally used to hide the nature, strength, and disposition of a friendly military force; to counter enemy screening units; to provide early warning of enemy approach; impede and demoralize the enemy forces with harassing fire; and to report on the enemy. Screening may be accomplished by any units or personnel assigned to do so on an ad hoc basis or by entities which, at least in part, specialize in screening, such as skirmishers, light infantry, and light cruisers (in naval warfare). Screening forces may be highly mobile, they may establish more static pickets or outposts, or they may utilize both tactics. Screening forces generally avoid becoming decisively engaged.

Screening doctrines have varied over time and by nation, but such forces are generally lightly armed and armoured, and it is neither expected nor generally desired that they become decisively engaged with the enemy. Screening forces may re-join the main body when their tasks are complete or they may continue to operate on and around the fringes of the enemy's lines and flanks.

Screening was heavily utilized in "traditional" symmetric warfare, with light infantry and light cavalry typically screening the main body of an advancing army. In modern warfare, screening may be performed by armoured cars, light tanks, infantry fighting vehicles, drones, and helicopters. Electronic warfare is additionally considered a modern screening ability.

Screening forces are distinct from covering forces; while the former are typically lightly armed and only expected to harass the enemy, the latter may have the capability to fully engage enemy forces, at least for a time.

A screening force is deployed over an extended area, to the rear and flanks of the main force, rather than to the front. The screening force's minimal tasks enable it to have a wide frontage. The "screen line" is the axis along which the screening unit is providing security. Aerial assets are used when ground assets cannot keep pace with the main body.

== See also ==
- Covering force
- Skirmisher
