= Noopolitik =

Knowledge theory in political science

In political science, Noopolitik, formed by a combination of the Greek words νόος nóos ("knowledge") and πολιτικός politikós (πολίτης polítēs "citizen", from πόλις pólis "city"), is the network-based geopolitics of knowledge. The term was invented by defense experts John Arquilla and David Ronfeldt in a 1999 RAND Corporation study and often appears in connection with that of smart power.

== Difference with Realpolitik ==
Noopolitics is an informational strategy of manipulating international processes through the forming in the general public, by means of mass media, of positive or negative attitudes to the external or internal policies of a state or block of states, to create a positive or negative image of ideas and promulgated moral values.

== Versus Foucault's Biopolitics ==
Tiziana Terranova (2007) describes the use of the term 'noopolitics' by Maurizio Lazzarato (2004). "'Noopolitics' supplements the biopolitics of the species described by Foucault" (Terranova 2007, 139). "Against the militarization of communication accomplished by new techniques of power, it is possible to think about the constitution of such publics as counter-weapons, which work by expressing, inventing and creating possible worlds where the moment of resistance (the 'no' by which one refuses to watch, listen or believe) is the starting point for an affirmative activity" (Terranova 2007, 140). Noyer & Juanals (2008) have also discussed Noopolitik as a means of social control. especially in connection with RAND's Byting back program which was published as research into counterinsurgency.

== In the knowledge economy and the BRICS ==
While the term initially appeared in association with the concept of the US Revolution in Military Affairs, Noopolitik has also come to describe an interest in the knowledge economy and in particular innovation and R&D to leverage growth and political reach in international relations. Thus Noopolitik may be defined as the use of innovation and knowledge to leverage political intercourses by other means at the international level. Such "knowledge race" may be either a means of asserting political independence or of generating a sudden gap in the geopolitical balance of power. The attitude of the People's Republic of China and the ANZUS in the Pacific Ocean has been described as such by Idriss J. Aberkane (2011).

Therefore, comparable to the Heartland, the “Heartocean” inevitably disputed by powers of which none may prevail alone in the future without a decisive innovation will become the scene of a commensurate Great Game with the two same grand stakes. This will be the fate (or doom) of multilateralism on the one side and the global knowledge race on the other. (...). As stated by Seth Cropsey (2010) commenting on China’s noopolitik move of deploying new anti-ship missiles in the ocean “keeping the Pacific pacific”. The two issues are well summarized.

=== For the People's Republic of China ===
Professor Li Xiguang of Tsinghua University described the stakes of Smart power for the People's Republic of China in a 2010 article on Noopolitik in the Global Times:

Soft power is the power of making people love you. Hard power is the ability to making people fear you. Over the last 500 years, all the world powers gained their hegemony through hard power, but the US has gained its hegemony through combining hard power and soft power, both striking at and assimilating its opponents.

The US has built its soft power by making its values and political system, such as the US interpretation and definition of democracy, freedom and human rights, into supposedly universal values.

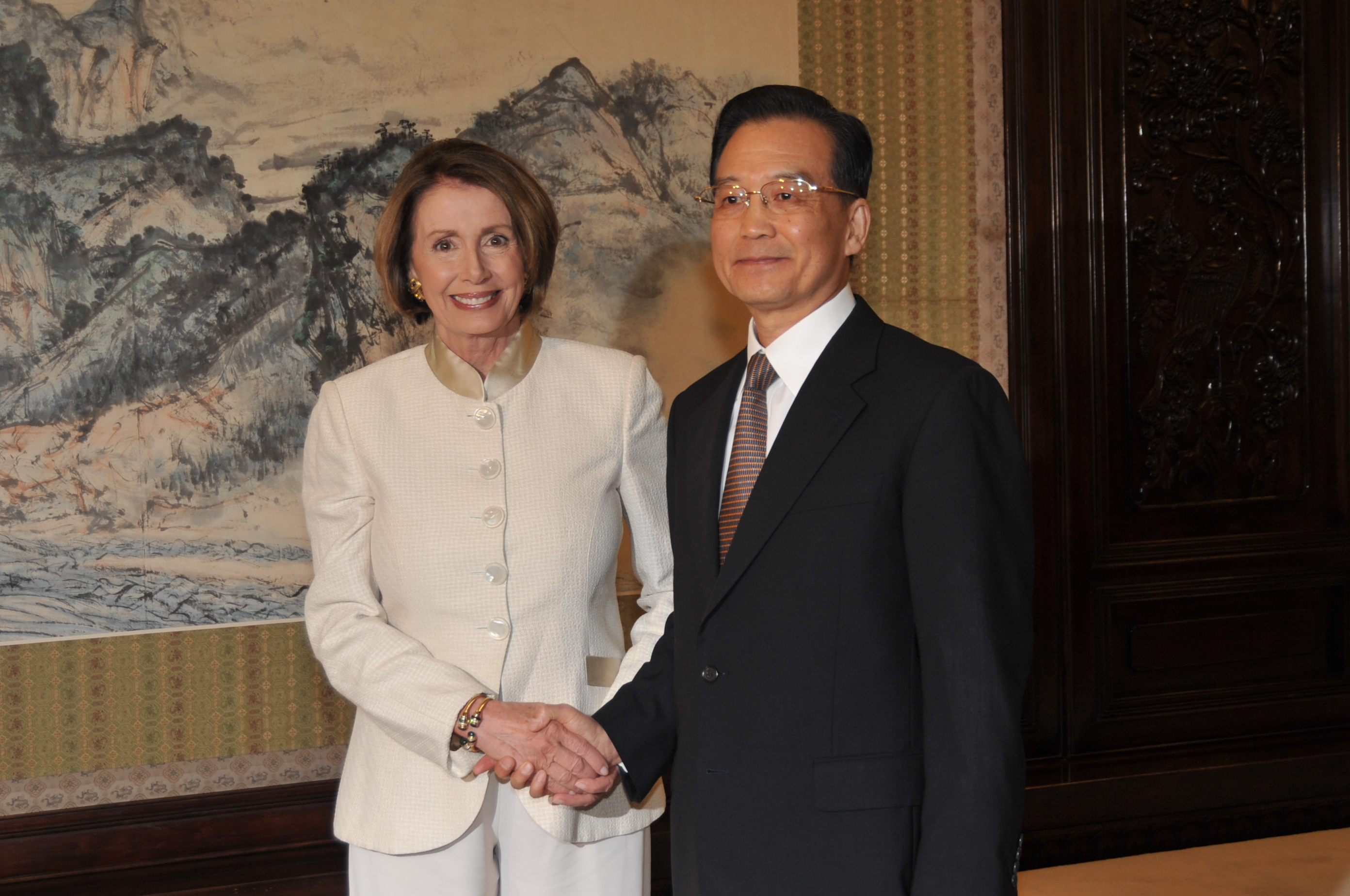
Then Speaker of the House Nancy Pelosi with Chinese Premier Wen Jiabao during a trip to China in 2009. The encounter was concomitant with the publication of a report on "Smart Power in U.S.-China Relations" by William Sebastian Cohen the Center for Strategic and International Studies.

Idriss Aberkane analyzes Noopolitik as a defining stance of the People's Republic of China's economic policy in which he concludes "Maintaining 'Leap and Bound' creativity could be an efficient way for China to neutralize popular frustration. What must be acknowledged is that the PRC has moved from a 'growth panacea' policy, to a policy of 'knowledge panacea.' This best sums up its Noopolitik."

Emphasizing China’s deeply-rooted desire for technological independence, Segal refers to the PRC’s efforts as an “Innovation Wall,” which is the willingness to innovate as independently as possible from the rest of the world to simply and systematically leap ahead of any other country. Needless to say, the scope of the rising fog of war in world economic and R&D competition is particularly daunting for the Euro-Atlantic community. The Chinese phrase for national innovation zizhu chuangxin was notably coined in a 2006 state report titled “Guidelines on National Medium- and Long-Term Program for Science and Technology Development.” If China decides to foster an innovation of its own, and the ideas were published in Mandarin language journals it would provide a barrier against other linguistic communities, and a thicker fog of war might rise in knowledge-based economic warfare.

== See also ==
- International relations
- Realpolitik
- Diplomacy

== Sources ==
- Arquilla, John; Ronfeldt, David (1999). The Emergence of Noopolitik: Toward an American Information Strategy. Rand. Archived from the original on 2007-05-06 – via Questia.
- Terranova, Tiziana . “Futurepublic: On Information Warfare, Bio-racism and Hegemony as Noopolitics.” Theory, Culture & Society 24.3 (2007): 125–145.
- Lazzarato, Maurizio (2004) La politica dell’evento. Cosenza: Rubbettino.
