= Terrorism Research Center =

Non-profit think-tank

TRC Logo

The Terrorism Research Center (TRC) is a non-profit think tank focused on investigating and researching global terrorism issues through multi-disciplinary collaboration amongst a group of international experts.

== History 1996 to 2012 ==
The TRC was founded in 1996 by Matthew Devost, Brian Houghton, and Neal Pollard to establish an organization with a specific focus on terrorism and emerging international security issues like information warfare. It was purchased by Blackwater's Erik Prince in 2007. Over the course of 14 years, the TRC conducted research, analysis, and training on variety of counterterrorism and homeland security issues.

=== Website (1996 to 2012) ===
The TRC web site (which operated at www.terrorism.com since 1996 and then also mirrored at www.homelandsecurity.com starting in 2000) was the top search engine result for “terrorism” and other security keywords for over a decade. The site regularly received as many as 5,000,000 hits per month and had tens of thousands of active registered users. The site has also been cited in thousands of books, news articles, academic papers, and other works.

== Major projects (1996 to 2012) ==
The TRC was involved in several major projects, from 1996:

- Responder Knowledge Base.
- Terrorism Early Warning Group Expansion Project.
- Mirror Image Training.
- RealNews List.
- Project Pediatric Preparedness.
- Lecture Series.

=== Responder Knowledge Base ===
The TRC conceived, prototyped, designed, built and operated the RKB over a period of six years. The RKB provided emergency responders, purchasers, and planners with a trusted, integrated, online source of information on products, standards, certifications, grants, and other equipment-related information. The RKB was operated by the Federal Emergency Management Agency (FEMA) from 2008 until it was decommissioned in September 2013.

=== Terrorism Early Warning Group Expansion Project ===
The TRC has worked with the Los Angeles Terrorism Early Warning (TEW) Group since 1997. The TRC and Los Angeles County Sheriff's Department (LASD) submitted a grant application to the Memorial Institute for the Prevention of Terrorism to expand the Terrorism Early Warning Group concept to six high threat cities in the U.S. The Terrorism Early Warning Group concept fulfills the intelligence requirements outlined in Homeland Security Directive 8: Interim National Preparedness Goal. After the September 11 attacks in 2001 and the formation of the Department of Homeland Security, the Terrorism Early Warning Group program was migrated to DHS and expanded to cover 56 high threat urban areas. The TRC worked with these 56 cities to develop early warning and intelligence centers that became the precursor the national Fusion Center network.

=== Mirror Image training ===
The TRC developed the renowned Mirror Image training program in 2001 to allow military, intelligence, security and first responder personnel to better understand the international terrorist threat. Participants were subjected to an intense immersion program where they were trained to think and act like the adversary and adopt their tactics, techniques, and procedures. TRC Mirror Image training became a U.S. Army Foundry course, was featured in major news media, and became the most popular training course the TRC ever developed.

=== RealNews List ===
The TRC provided a free daily news clipping service on a variety of global security issues. An archive of several hundred thousand clippings was available via the TRC web site. The mailing of the TRC free daily news clipping service, became known as the 'early bird of global risk issues'.

=== Project Pediatric Preparedness ===
The TRC 'Project Pediatric Preparedness' report responded to emergency preparedness and response planning, technology investments, and training frequently, in respect to the unique requirements of responding to pediatric victims of a larger scale terrorist attack. The project explained these unique needs and gaps, and provided a foundation for homeland security planning for pediatric victims of terrorism. The final report described the minimum capabilities essential for emergency response to pediatric victims. The report laid out fifteen Functional Areas for pediatric response – general areas describing functions, tasks, and missions of emergency response. This report is available on the TRC website.

=== Lecture series ===
The TRC developed a lecture series, that brought together a wide array of experts to discuss emerging threats. These lectures were then released as audio downloads on the site. Popular speakers from the lecture series included Brian Michael Jenkins, Rohan Gunaratna, and Hekmat Karzai.

== 2005 U.S. Capitol flag honor ==
In 2005, to honor of TRC's contributions to the first responder community through the development of the RKB system, it received a U.S. flag that had been flown over the U.S. Capitol building (one of more than 100,000 such flags flown annually).

== Today ==
Early in 2009, none of the TRC founders were still involved with the center. The Terrorism Research Center ceased operations in 2010 at the discretion of new owners and managers.
In April 2012, the founders of the TRC announced it was being reconstituted as a non-profit at www.terrorism.org. The new focus was on sponsoring research publications, and facilitating research. In December 2014, the TRC was included as a collaborating partner with the Microsimulation & Risk Modelling Group at the University of Wollongong. The project with them is assessing the tactics and counter tactics involved in lone wolf knife attacks on the public.

=== 2012-2013 publications ===
The Terrorism Research Center has initiated sponsorship of new publications in terrorism, and related research areas. The main focus has been research into Terrorist Tactics, Techniques, and Procedures by its research associates, such as Dr. Robert J. Bunker, and Dr. Chris Flaherty. The 2012-2014 Terrorism Research Center sponsored publications:

- Flaherty, C. (2012) Dangerous Minds: A Monograph on the Relationship Between Beliefs –Behaviours – Tactics. Published by OODA LOOP (7 September 2012).
- Flaherty, C. (2012) Adam Lanza and Dangerous Minds. Published by OODA LOOP (19 December 2012).
- Flaherty, C. (2013) Skid Row Terrorist. Published by OODA LOOP (26 July 2013).

The TRC research in 2013 made a significant contribution to the understanding of surgically implanted explosive devices, better known as the 'Body Cavity Bomb' (BCB) concept:

- Bunker, R.J. Flaherty, C. (eds.) (2013) Body Cavity Bombers: The New Martyrs. Published by Terrorism Research Center (http://www.terrorism.org/). iUniverse, Inc. Bloomington.

=== 2014 publications ===
The TRC research in 2014 has continued to develop new publications in terrorism, and related research areas, with the latest research, on interposing tactics, as a branch of Terrorist Tactics, Techniques, and Procedures, by its research associate Dr. Chris Flaherty.

- Flaherty, C. (2014) 3D Vulnerability Analysis Solution to the Problem of Military Energy Security and Interposing Tactics. Journal of Information Warfare. (13)1: 33-41.

The TRC research in 2014, has also developed a new reader on Fifth Dimensional Operations:

- Robert J. Bunker & Charles "Sid" Heal. (2014) Fifth Dimensional Operations: Space-Time-Cyber Dimensionality in Conflict and War—A Terrorism Research Center Book. iuniverse.

=== 2015 publications ===
The 2015 published TRC research has included a new reader on current terrorism analysis, and has continued work on Terrorist Tactics, Techniques, and Procedures (TTPs):

- Robert J. Bunker, John P. Sullivan, Brian M. Jenkins, Matt Devost, and James T. Kirkhope (Editors) (2015) Counterterrorism: Bridging Operations and Theory: A Terrorism Research Center Book. iUniverse. This book incorporated 50 contributors, including internationally recognized scholars: Dr. John Arquilla; Dr. Martin van Creveld; Dr. Rohan Gunaratna; Brian Michael Jenkins.
- Chris Flaherty (2015) Wild Predator Erratic Attacks versus Dynamic Defence. Journal of Information Warfare. (14)1.

=== 2016 publications ===
- Bunker, R.J. (ed.) (2016) Blood Sacrifices: Violent Non-State Actors and Dark Magico-Religious Activities. Published by Terrorism Research Center (http://www.terrorism.org/). iUniverse, Inc. Bloomington.
- Chris Flaherty (2016) Employment of 3D-Printed Guns in the 5D Battlespace. Journal of Information Warfare. (15)1.
