= David Ronfeldt =

American researcher

David Ronfeldt (David Frederick Ronfeldt) (born 20 June 1941) is an American researcher known for his work on information-centric and network-centric warfare. He holds a doctoral degree from Stanford University and has been a prominent figure at the RAND Corporation.

Ronfeldt has made significant contributions to the understanding of social evolution, particularly with his development of the TIMN framework, which theorizes the evolution of societies through four forms of organization: Tribes, Institutions, Markets, and Networks, which provides a lens to view social evolution and has been influential in various academic and policy-making circles.

With John Arquilla, he coined the term "Noopolitik," which represents the network-based geopolitics of knowledge.

They argue that the development of education and training in "noopolitik" will be critical for future strategists, addressing the current underuse of soft power due to its limited theoretical framework compared to hard power.

== Early life and education ==
David Ronfeldt completed his doctoral studies at Stanford University, focusing on social science disciplines. His academic background laid the foundation for his future research endeavors, which intersected the fields of political science, sociology, and information technology.

== Career at RAND Corporation ==
Ronfeldt's career at the RAND Corporation has spanned several decades, during which he has extensively researched the impact of information technology on warfare and society. His work has been pivotal in understanding how technological advancements influence political and social structures.

== Key publications ==
- "In Search of How Societies Work: Tribes — the First and Forever Form" (2007): exploring the fundamental role of tribal structures in societal evolution RAND.
- "Swarming & The Future of Conflict" (2000): Co-authored with John Arquilla, this work delved into modern warfare tactics and the concept of 'swarming' as a strategic approach in conflict.
- "The Zapatista Social Netwar in Mexico" (1998): An analysis of the Zapatista Movement in Mexico, highlighting the role of social networks in modern insurgencies.
- "Cyberocracy Is Coming" (1992): In this early work, Ronfeldt envisioned the rise of 'cyberocracy' – governance influenced by information technology, foreseeing the significant impact of the internet and digital communication on political systems.

== See also ==
- Cyber-terrorism
- Cyberwar
- Information warfare
- Proactive cyber defence
