= James P. Wade =

American writer (1930–2017)

James Paul Wade Jr. (December 26, 1930 – March 21, 2017) was an American military writer. He was the author, with Harlan K. Ullman of the doctrine of strategic dominance, more popularly known as shock and awe. They published their concept in Shock and Awe: Achieving Rapid Dominance, a 1996 monograph of the National Defense University.

In 1977, he was appointed by President Jimmy Carter as Chairman of the Military Liaison Committee to the United States Department of Energy.

Wade died on March 21, 2017, at the age of 86.
