= Interposing tactics =

Interposing Tactics is tactical concept, developed under Terrorist Tactics, Techniques, and Procedures, to explain a tactical action where a small-scale action takes place between two combatants, where one manoeuvres into interposition or interjection within a tactical situation, and disrupts the action or activity, of the opponent.

== Origin ==
In the game of chess, for example, an interposing move would be one in which a player moves a piece between their king and the opponent's piece which has placed the king in check.

- The chess example demonstrates that a key feature of interposing tactics, namely the deployment of forces to block and cover friendly from hostile.
- An extension of this idea would involve opposing forces dispelling or scattering much more freely within an operational area to achieve the effect of blocking and covering all friendlies from hostiles.

The basis of these actions, is what are called tactical subdivision.

== Tactical subdivision ==
The concept of tactical subdivision, is found in the work of Liddell Hart. His thesis on the nature of tactical subdivision in combat was that determination of capacity for tactical subdivision was capability for separate maneuver, offense, and resistance. In developing the Interposing Tactics concept, the Liddell Hart concept of the 'combat unit' (which in his time period, was the smallest grouping capable of tactical subdivision, namely the infantry platoon), has been redefined as, "single individual fighters and unmanned or independently operating weaponry." The Interposing Tactics concept, further identifies, that in an area of operations, in particular terrorism or insurgency operations, there can be many independent fighters who are spread out independently through a population, and concealed among opponent combat forces (even within their own control zones), and can independently block and cover individual opponent forces.
