= Revolution in military affairs =

Theoretical revolutionary change in warfare

A revolution in military affairs (RMA) is a hypothesis in military theory about the future of warfare, often connected to technological and organizational recommendations for military reform.

Broadly stated, RMA claims that in certain periods of the history of humankind, there were new military doctrines, strategies, tactics and technologies which led to an irrecoverable change in the conduct of warfare. Furthermore, those changes compel an accelerated adaptation of novel doctrines and strategies.

In the United States, RMA is often linked to discussions such as the reorganization plan of the United States Army and total systems integration.

== History ==
The original theorizing was done by the Soviet Armed Forces in the 1970s and 1980s, particularly by Marshal Nikolai Ogarkov. The United States initially became interested in it through Andrew Marshall, the head of the Office of Net Assessment, a Department of Defense think tank. It slowly gained credence within official military circles, and other nations began exploring similar shifts in organization and technology.

Interest in RMA and the structure of future U.S. armed forces is strong within China's People's Liberation Army and it has been incorporated into China's strategic military doctrine. Many other militaries have also researched and considered RMA as an organizational concept—e.g., those of Canada, United Kingdom, the Netherlands, Sweden, Australia, New Zealand, South Africa, Singapore, Republic of China (Taiwan), India, Russia, and Germany—but not all militaries have adopted RMA, due to its significant infrastructure and investment costs.

=== Soviet views ===
Nikolai Ogarkov called the early idea of RMA the Military Technological Revolution (MTR). Pentagon officials in the United States changed the name of his original idea, which is how it became known as RMA. Ogarkov's belief was that the potential and possibility for new weapons was increasing rapidly and leading to the development of his initial idea.

At the time of the initial development of MTR, the Soviets anticipated that certain technologies, including energy weapons and robots, would be in use by 2015 at the latest. They believed that the use of large ground forces would be minimized. In place of some ground forces, these new technologies would be implemented in order to establish dominance on the battlefield. Russians also believed that control of space would become essential for maintaining dominance in future conflicts. Soviets believed that it would be essential to control the satellite space around Earth, in order to more effectively relay information. They also anticipated the ability to use space as a medium in which they could deploy weapons.

=== Renewed interest ===
The United States' victory in the 1991 Gulf War renewed interest in RMA theory. In the view of RMA proponents, American dominance through superior technology emphasized how the United States' technological advances reduced the relative power of the Iraqi military, by no means a lightweight rival, to insignificance. According to Stephen Biddle, part of the growth in popularity of the RMA theory after the Gulf War was that virtually all American military experts drastically over-estimated the coalition casualty count. This led many experts to assume that their models of war were wrong—that a revolution of sorts had occurred.

After the Kosovo War, in which the United States did not lose a single life, others suggested that war had become too sterile, creating a "virtual war". Furthermore, the United States’ inability to capture Osama bin Laden or effectively combat the Iraqi insurgency led some to question RMA in the face of asymmetrical warfare, in which foes of the United States may increasingly engage in order to counter RMA's advantages.

In 1997, the U.S. Army mounted an exercise codenamed "Force 21", to test the application of digital technologies in warfare in order to improve communications and logistics by applying private-sector technologies adapted for military use. Specifically, it sought to increase awareness of one's position on the battlefield as well as that of the enemy, in order to achieve increased lethality, greater control of the tempo of warfare, and fewer instances of friendly fire via improved identification friend or foe.

In 2002, Chris Bray described RMA as new ideas about "the use of information and automation on the battlefield" to make forces "more lethal" and "more agile."

== Areas of focus ==
One of the central problems in understanding the current debate over RMA arises from many theorists' use of the term to refer to the revolutionary technology itself, which is the driving force of change. Concurrently, other theorists tend to use the term as referring to revolutionary adaptations by military organisations that may be necessary to deal with the changes in technology. Other theorists place RMA more closely inside the specific political and economic context of globalization and the end of the Cold War.

When reviewing the gamut of theories, three fundamental versions of RMA come to the forefront. The first perspective focuses primarily upon changes in the nation-state and the role of an organised military in using force. This approach highlights the political, social, and economic factors worldwide, which might require a completely different type of military and organisational structure to apply force in the future.

Authors such as the RAND Corporation's Sean J. A. Edwards (advocate of BattleSwarm tactics, a type of military swarming), Carl H. Builder and Lt. Col. Ralph Peters emphasized the decline of the nation-state, the nature of the emerging international order, and the different types of forces needed in the near future.

The second perspective—most commonly assigned the term RMA—highlights the evolution of weapons technology, information technology, military organization, and military doctrine among advanced powers. This "System of Systems" perspective on RMA has been ardently supported by Admiral William Owens, former Vice Chairman of the Joint Chiefs of Staff, who identified three overlapping areas for force assets. These are intelligence, surveillance and reconnaissance, command, control, communications and intelligence processing, which allows for the use of precision force.

Advanced versions of RMA incorporate other sophisticated technologies, including unmanned aerial vehicles (UAVs), nanotechnology, robotics, and biotechnology. Recently, the RMA debate focused on "network-centric warfare" which is a doctrine that aims to connect all troops on the battlefield.

Finally, the third concept is that a "true" revolution in military affairs has not yet occurred or is unlikely to. Authors such as Michael E. O'Hanlon and Frederick Kagan, point to the fact much of the technology and weapons systems ascribed to the contemporary RMA were in development long before 1991 and the Internet and information technology boom.

Several critics point out that a "revolution" within the military ranks might carry detrimental consequences, produce severe economic strain, and ultimately prove counterproductive. Such authors tend to profess a much more gradual "evolution" in military affairs, as opposed to a rapid revolution. In 2021 the Chief of Naval Operations stated that it was a mistake to concurrently introduce 23 unproven technologies onboard carrier USS Gerald R. Ford (CVN-78) before land-based testing, in particular the weapons elevators. The Air Force also developed the F-35 concurrently with its production, and is now seeking another fighter that is less expensive to operate; The cost penalty for concurrent development and production of the F-35 is estimated to be $2 billion.

=== Precision attack ===
By 2021 the concept and capability for Long range precision fires had developed sufficiently to be able to schedule their initial fielding by 2023, in its various materiel forms, as well as to be able to communicate the necessary doctrine for their application by the United States. In brief, no headquarters, no command center, no air defense, no missile battery, nor any logistics center of an adversary is safe in the event of war. Moreover, the strikes will be precise enough to paralyze the adversary's massed military capability. See: Artillery § Precision-guidance

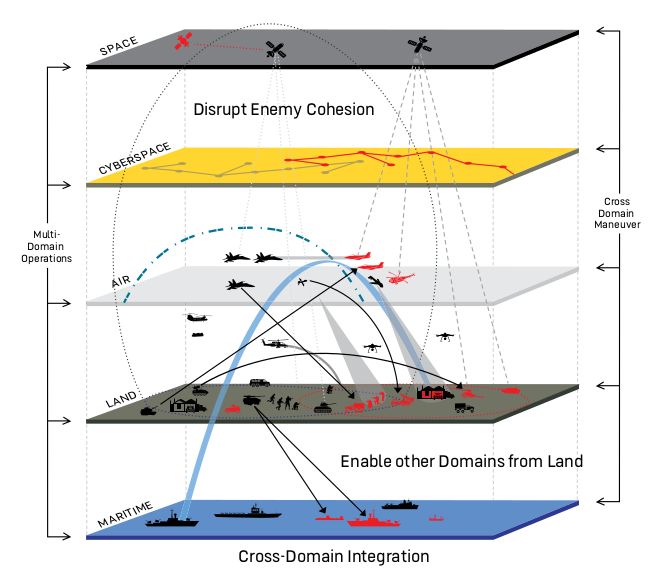
In a conflict, friendly forces (denoted in black) work as an integrated force against adversaries (denoted in red). The force operates in Multi-domains (gray, yellow, light gray, dark gray, and dark blue) —Space, Cyber, Air, Land, and Maritime respectively— severally and simultaneously cooperating across domains. These operations will disrupt the adversaries, and present them multiple simultaneous dilemmas. The operations are designed to encourage adversaries to learn the advantages of a return to competition, rather than continuing a conflict, or avoiding conflict altogether (deterrence). A multi-domain task force (MDTF) can simultaneously operate across multiple stages of the conflict continuum, and engage antagonists at thousands of miles, for sustained periods.

In considering the implications of precision attack, it is clear that precision weapons, when coupled to recent developments in aerospace, have transformed warfare, and as a result, the question is not that "Does an RMA exist?" rather, "When did it begin, and what are its implications?" Tied to this are surprisingly persistent questions about the use and value of air power, now more accurately seen as aerospace power. If nothing else, given the record of precision air power application, aerospace power advocates should not still have to spend as much time as they do arguing the merits of three-dimensional war and precision attack's value to it. Modern joint service aerospace forces offer the most responsive, flexible, lethal, and devastating form of power projection across the spectrum of conflict, employing a range of aerospace weaponry such as maritime patrol aircraft, attack and troop-lift helicopters, land-based long-range aircraft, and battlefield rocket artillery systems. Service-specific aerospace power can often be formidable and, as such, has transformed conflict from two-dimensional to three-dimensional, and has changed the critical focus of conflict from that of seizing and holding to one of halting and controlling.

In reviewing a few points from the military history of the 20th century, within roughly a decade of the first flight of an airplane, aircraft were having an occasionally decisive effect on the battlefield. Within four decades, a nation—Great Britain—secured its national survival through air warfare. By the midst of the Second World War, three-dimensional attack (from above and below the surface) had become the primary means of sinking both vessels at sea and destroying the combat capability of armies on land. In fact, for the United States, this trend of inflicting losses and material destruction primarily through air attack continued after the second world war for Korea, Vietnam, the Gulf, Bosnia, and other, lesser, conflicts. In particular, air attack directed against land forces has been especially powerful in blunting and destroying opponents on the offensive, whether in older experience—such as confronting Rommel in the Western Desert, or German armored forces trying to split the Normandy invasion at Mortain, or at the Bulge (where German commanders credited Allied fighter attacks on fuel trucks and supplies as being the decisive factor in halting their drive), in the opening and closing stages of the Korean War, and confronting the 1972 North Vietnamese Spring Invasion—or, more recently, in destroying the Khafji offensive of Saddam Hussein in 1991. NATO's reliance upon air power in the Yugoslav Wars was not surprising because from the very earliest days, the NATO alliance saw air power as the linchpin of Western military strength and the necessary offset to the Warsaw Pact's huge military forces.

Given its historical underpinnings, we should not be surprised that the revolution in warfare that has been brought about both by the confluence of the aerospace and the electronic revolutions, and by the offshoot of both—the precision guided munition—is one that has been a long time coming, back to the Second World War, back, even, to the experimenters of the First World War who attempted, however crudely, to develop "smart" weapons to launch from airships and other craft. Used almost experimentally until the latter stages of the Vietnam War, the precision weapon since that time has increasingly come to first influence, then dominate, and now perhaps to render superfluous, the traditional notion of a linear battlefield. A cease-fire in the 2020 Nagorno-Karabakh war was brokered by the effective use of armed drones, loitering munitions which would lock-on to a ground target, and strike it while transmitting pictures of the kill.

In 2009 the Future Combat Systems project was cancelled by the Secretary of Defense, as too ambitious for the time. The Decker-Wagner report (2011) in fact recommended the dissolution of RDECOM, the R&D arm of the US Army. De-layering of the commands of the US Army in order to speed up development of materiel was begun in 2017.

By 2021 long range precision fires (LRPF) at ranges well over 1725 miles were developed and well on the way toward initial fielding in 2023. The Space Development Agency's National defense space architecture is an essential part of this plan.

== Criticism ==
The revolution of military affairs is the inclusion and expansion of new technology—e.g., drones, satellite imaging, and remotely operated vehicles—within current military tactics. RMA has generally been praised for its ability to reduce casualty rates and facilitate intelligence gathering. On the other hand, some critics argue that RMA serves to further dissociate soldiers from the horrific realities of warfare, while others maintain that RMA restricts the overall understanding of warfare and its dynamics. Scholars recommend gaining a critical understanding of RMA before implementing it.

Operation Desert Storm is considered the first major global conflict successfully implementing RMA and is considered a paragon of future military operations due to the low casualty rate and the U.S. military's speed and precision. On the other hand, others claim that RMA technology severely inhibited the U.S. military's ability to respond to guerrilla tactics and that efforts to incorporate advanced weapons like Patriot missiles were unsuccessful. Indeed, a number of epistemological issues have cropped up.

In the wake of RMA technologies such as drones, unmanned ground vehicles, and clean bombs there are several concerns about the distancing and disassociation that eclipse the realities of war. An analysis of tactical strikes reveals that while the number of ones own soldiers may be preserved as the number of long-range attacks increases, so does collateral damage. Furthermore, by removing the soldier-on-soldier element of warfare, the natural reactions and consequences of wartime actions are impacted, which has been frequently referred to as the removal of humanity from war. RMA technological advances have resulted in a dehumanizing of warfare, which negatively effects the decisions made by officers, as well as individuals in the field. Another critique argues that RMA's good intentions notwithstanding, the resulting collateral damage is unacceptable and thus urges more careful consideration in incorporating RMA technology.

Stephen Biddle's 2004 book, Military Power: Explaining Victory and Defeat in Modern War, discounts the idea of RMA. He argues that military doctrine and tactics are far more important to battle outcomes in modern warfare than is technological progress, and that basic doctrine has changed little since the second half of World War I.

== See also ==
- Networked swarming warfare
- Effects-based operations
- Full spectrum dominance
- Military intelligence (MI)
- C4ISR and C4ISTAR
- Information warfare
- Electronic warfare
- Airborne Early Warning and Control
- Communications satellite
- Spy satellite
- Precision-guided munition
- Rapid dominance

US military-specific:

- Transformation of the United States Army, the future-concept of the US Army's modernization plan
- Battle Command Knowledge System
- Future Combat Systems
- Information Awareness Office (IAO), was established by DARPA
- DoDAF
- Global Information Grid
- ARPANET
- E-8 Joint STARS
- Joint Tactical Information Distribution System
- Tactical Data Link
- Rumsfeld Doctrine
- AirSea Battle
