= Robert J. Bunker =

American academic

- Born: Los Angeles, California, U.S.
- Education: Claremont Graduate University (Ph.D.)
- Occupations: Academic, theorist, security consultant
- Known for: Non-state threat analysis, future warfare theory
- Notable work: Non-state Threats and Future Wars, Red Teams and Counterterrorism

Robert J. Bunker is an American academic and an applied theorist on national security and other advanced concepts.

== Key research areas ==
Bunker's research is mainly focused on:

- Non-state threat groups,
- Counter-threat strategies,
- Future war/conflict.

Bunker has also made significant contributions to the debate on the 'Body Cavity Bomb' (BCB) concept.

== Background ==
Bunker is from the Los Angeles area of California. He is an Epochal Warfare Studies Scholar, and security consultant focusing on non-state opposing force research, analysis, and defeat strategies. He holds a Ph.D. in political science from the Claremont Graduate University, and five other university degrees, in political science, government, behavioral science, social science, anthropology-geography, and history.

Bunker has over 200 publications including numerous edited works, booklets, chapters, and articles in policy, law enforcement, and military venues. He has been involved in red teaming and counter-terrorism exercises and has provided operations support within Los Angeles County.

He is also a top Risk player, having competed in the Risk Tournament of Champions several times.

== Publications ==
Bunker's books on security and defence related topics include:

- Non-state Threats and Future Wars, by Robert J. Bunker (Ed.) (2002)
- Networks, Terrorism and Global Insurgency, by Robert J. Bunker (Ed.) (2005)
- Red Teams and Counterterrorism (International and Security Affairs), by Stephen Sloan and Robert J. Bunker (2011).
- Criminal-States and Criminal-Soldiers, by Robert J. Bunker (Ed.) (2008).
- Narcos Over the Border: Gangs, Cartels and Mercenaries, by Robert J Bunker (Ed.) (2010)
- Mexico's Criminal Insurgency: A Small Wars Journal-El Centro Anthology, by John P. Sullivan and Robert J. Bunker (Primary Authors) (2012).
- Criminal Insurgencies in Mexico and the Americas: The Gangs and Cartels Wage War, by Robert J. Bunker (Ed.) (2012).
- Mexican Cartel Essays and Notes: Strategic, Operational, and Tactical: A Small Wars Journal-El Centro Anthology, by Robert J. Bunker (Primary Author) (2013).
- Studies in Gangs and Cartels, by Robert J. Bunker and John P. Sullivan (2013).
- Body Cavity Bombers: The New Martyrs: A Terrorism Research Center Book, by Robert J. Bunker and Christopher James Flaherty (Primary Authors) (2013).
- Global Criminal and Sovereign Free Economies and the Demise of the Western Democracies (Routledge Advances in International Political Economy), by Robert J. Bunker and Pamela Ligouri Bunker (Eds.) (2014).
- Fifth Dimensional Operations: Space-Time-Cyber Dimensionality in Conflict and War, by Robert J. Bunker and Charles "Sid" Heal (2014).

== House Foreign Affairs Subcommittee on the Western Hemisphere ==
On September 13, 2011, Bunker gave testimony before a joint hearing with the House Foreign Affairs Subcommittee on the Western Hemisphere. His testimony was about the Mérida Initiative, which is the US effort to provide support to Mexico's security apparatus in fighting the drug cartels in Mexico.

== Terrorism Research Center ==
Bunker is also a research associate at the Terrorism Research Center.

== Associations ==
Bunker's present associations include the Claremont Graduate University as adjunct faculty, and Small Wars Journal-El Centro as a Senior Fellow.

Bunker's past associations include the Los Angeles High Intensity Drug Trafficking Area (LA-HIDTA), Counter-OPFOR Corporation, University of Southern California, FBI Academy (as Futurist in Residence), National Law Enforcement and Corrections Technology Center—West, and the Los Angeles Terrorism Early Warning Group.
