= Saturation attack =

Military tactic of overwhelming the defending side

A saturation attack or swarm attack is a military tactic in which the attacking side hopes to gain an advantage by swarming and overwhelming the defending side's technological, physical, and mental ability to respond effectively.

During the Cold War and after, the conventional saturation missile attack against naval and land targets was and is a much feared eventuality.

== Theoretical calculations ==
Taking the design of an anti-ship missile as a theoretical example, one can begin with the goal of creating a missile which will get through and destroy its target 100% of the time. It is also understood, however, that an opponent will develop counter measures if given enough time, meaning that the missile will, at some later date, no longer be 100% effective. Therefore, given that even the best designed missile will only ever be less than 100% effective, it is more practical and cost-effective to instead develop a missile that will get through to the target 70% or even 50% of time, for example.

Launched individually, a missile with a 50% chance of getting through to its target will only get to its target 50% of the time, but with a salvo of two such missiles, the chance of at least one missile getting through is 75%, with three missiles 87.5%, etc. The probability that at least one missile will get through to its target becomes closer to certainty with each missile fired. If each missile has a warhead capable of destroying the target, then no individual missile can be ignored by the target warship and counter-measures. Thus, surface-to-air missiles (SAMs) and close-in weapons system (CIW) resources will have to be expended in larger numbers to defend the target. To further overload a target's ability to defend itself, an attacker can attempt to launch multiple missiles from multiple directions using different guidance options.

The main subscribers to the concept of the saturation missile attack were the Soviet Union and its client states. The Komar class missile boat, for example, was designed and operated around the calculations that it would take 12 P-15 Termit missiles to destroy a single NATO destroyer. At a time when British destroyers were equipped with just four anti-ship missiles, Soviet ships were going to sea with up to 20 anti-ship missiles; even destroyers fielded 8 large missiles. With NATO allies having followed the route of individually smaller and lighter missiles, NATO warships had the appearance of being underarmed when compared to Soviet ships and their multiple missiles in large container/launch tube housings.

== Bomber stream ==
The bomber stream was a tactic pioneered by the RAF to overwhelm German air defences during the Second World War. The tactic relied on routing a greater number of bombers through a defensive sector than the amount against which Germans could generate interception sorties. Although it was certain that bombers would be lost, it was impossible for the defending fighters to destroy every bomber and stop the bombers gaining their objective.

During the Cold War, British and American air defences aimed to stop massed Soviet bomber streams, leading to the US fielding nuclear tipped Nike missiles. At a later date, the British equipped trainer aircraft as interceptors in order to have enough fighters.

== Countering ==
During the Cold War, United States Navy aircraft carriers were the primary target of saturation attacks from Soviet Naval Aviation. In response, the United States adopted the doctrine of attempting to destroy Soviet missile aircraft before they could launch their missiles. This led to the development and production of the Douglas F6D Missileer, which gave rise to the Northrop Grumman E-2 Hawkeye and Grumman F-14 Tomcat/AIM-54 Phoenix pairing.

In naval warfare, the incorporation of stealth technology in surface combatants, the general adoption of vertical launching systems; modern radar systems which can simultaneously scan, track, and engage multiple targets; and fire-and-forget close-in defense missiles has decreased the utility of saturation attacks by unsophisticated anti-ship missiles.

== See also ==
- Human wave attack
- Force concentration
- Swarming (military)
