= Cyberware (disambiguation) =

Cyberware is neuroprosthetics.

Cyberware may also refer to:

- Cyberware (company), a Californian company producing high-end 3D scanners
- Cyberware Productions, Finnish record company, distributing Neuroactive (among others)

== See also ==
- Cyberwar (disambiguation)
