= Rumsfeld Doctrine =

American military doctrine

The "Rumsfeld Doctrine", named after former United States Secretary of Defense Donald Rumsfeld, is a phrase coined by journalists concerned with the perceived transformation of the U.S. military. It would be considered Rumsfeld's own take on RMA (revolution in military affairs). It seeks to increase force readiness and decrease the amount of supply required to maintain forces, by reducing the number in a theater. This is done mainly by using LAVs (Light Armored Vehicles) to scout for enemies who are then destroyed via airstrikes. The basic tenets of this military strategy are:

- High-technology combat systems;
- Reliance on air forces;
- Small, nimble ground forces.

The early phases of the wars in Afghanistan and Iraq are considered the two closest implementations of this doctrine.

== Response ==
Opponents argue that the doctrine entails a heavy reliance on airstrikes to replace a lack of ground forces. Beginning with Saddam Hussein, there were at least 50 airstrikes aimed at decapitating the Iraqi government. Not a single one was successful. However, there were extensive civilian casualties. This was coined the "shock and awe" military campaign.

Opponents also claim that without ground troops to secure the border, top Ba'athist regime members fled the country with vast Iraqi funds and foreign insurgents moved into the country. There were not enough troops to defend the Iraqi border from foreign-backed insurgents.

They also claim that without sufficient troops the country could not be pacified. Without sufficient troops to guard Iraqi military infrastructure, large amounts of munitions were looted. This has led to the current problem of insurgents and their improvised explosive devices (IEDs). Thomas Friedman of The New York Times has referred to the Rumsfeld Doctrine as one of "just enough troops to lose".

That said, the war plan for the Iraq War led to a quick and decisive victory over one of the region's largest and best equipped military forces. Using tactics honed from those used during the Gulf War, the Balkans, and Afghanistan, the U.S.-led coalition's integrated forces strategy overwhelmed the Iraqi defenses using rapid deployment and engagement of military "power" rather than overwhelming them with overwhelming forces, or overwhelming numbers.

== See also ==
- Bush Doctrine
- Network-centric warfare
- Powell Doctrine
- Revolution in military affairs
- Shock and awe
- Weinberger Doctrine
