= Harlan K. Ullman =

American policy adviser and writer (born 1941)

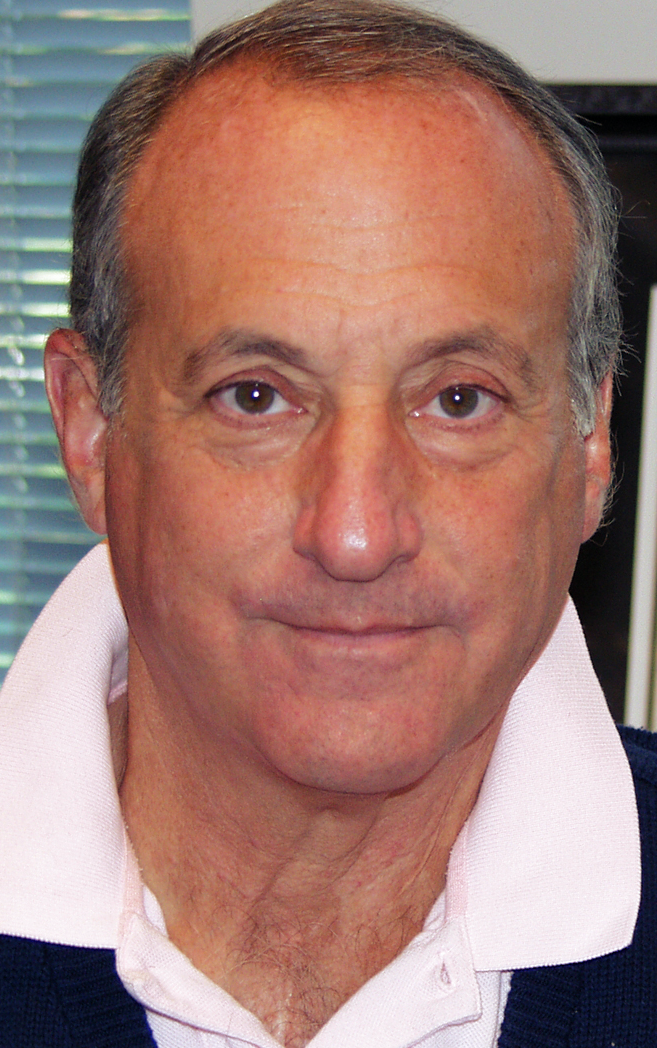
Ullman in 2017

Harlan Kenneth Ullman (born March 14, 1941) is Chairman of the Killowen Group, an advisory firm serving leaders in government and business; Chairman Emeritus of CNIGuard Ltd. and CNIGuard Inc.

He is also engaged in protection of critical infrastructure; Senior Advisor of the Atlantic Council in Washington, DC; and active on a number of private boards.

He is a former naval officer, and has commanded destroyers as well as Swift Boats in Vietnam in over 150 combat patrols and actions. He was the principal author of the "shock and awe" doctrine.

== Biography ==
He graduated from the U.S. Naval Academy in 1963. He holds MA, MALD, and Ph.D. from The Fletcher School at Tufts University.

He currently chairs the Killowen Group and CNIGuard PLC, in the infrastructure protection sector; is Senior Advisor at the Atlantic Council; Arnaud de Borchgrave Distinguished UPI Columnist

In 2007, Ullman was outed as a client of the DC Madam, who also described him as an "unpleasant person."

== Theories ==
Ullman was the principal author of the doctrine of shock and awe "that was a product of the National Defense University of the United States. This concept is technically known as rapid dominance and is a military doctrine based on the use of overwhelming decisive force, dominant battlefield awareness, dominant maneuvers, and spectacular displays of power to paralyze an adversary's perception of the battlefield and destroy his will to fight.

== Bibliography ==
=== Books ===
- In Harm's Way: American Seapower and the 21st Century by Harlan K. Ullman, 1991, Bartleby Press, ISBN 978-0910155182
- Shock and Awe - Achieving Rapid Dominance, Harlan K. Ullman and James P. Wade, with L.A. "Bud" Edney, Fred M. Franks, Charles A. Horner, and Jonathan T. Howe, 1996, National Defense University, reprint edition 2008: Forgotten Books ISBN 978-1606801505
- Unfinished Business: Afghanistan, the Middle East, and Beyond—Defusing the Dangers That Threaten America's Security by Harlan Ullman, foreword by John S. McCain, Citadel, 2002 ISBN 978-0806524313
- Owls and Eagles: Ending the Foreign Policy Flights of Fancy of Hawks, Doves, and Neo-Cons, 2005, Rowman & Littlefield Publishers, ISBN 978-0742549302
- America's Promise Restored: Preventing Culture, Crusade, and Partisanship from Wrecking Our Nation by Harlan Ullman, 2006, Carroll & Graf, ISBN 978-0786717583
- A Handful of Bullets: How the Murder of Archduke Franz Ferdinand Still Menaces the Peace, 2014, Naval Institute Press, ISBN 978-1612517995
- Anatomy of failure : why America loses every war it starts. Annapolis: Naval Institute Press. 2017.
- The Fifth Horseman and the New MAD, 2022, Post Hill Press, ISBN 978-1637581391

==== Critical studies and reviews of Ullman's work ====
Anatomy of failure

- Lord Richards of Herstmonceux (Summer 2018). "[Untitled book review]". Book Reviews. Naval War College Review. 71 (3): 150–152 7.
