= Virtual war =

Virtual war signifies the increased use of and dependence on technology in the course of warfare. It includes the time/space separation between an attacker and the intended target which results in the "sanitization" of war. The concept has gained notoriety amongst policy makers and academics who study the Revolution in Military Affairs. James Der Derian, in his book Virtuous War: Mapping the Military-Industrial-Media-Entertainment Network elaborates extensively on the concept of Virtual War and the consequences of increased technological integration within modern militaries.
