= Shock and awe =

Military strategy based on overwhelming power

Shock and awe (technically known as rapid dominance) is a military strategy based on the use of overwhelming power and spectacular displays of force to paralyze the enemy's perception of the battlefield and destroy their will to fight. Though the concept has a variety of historical precedents, the doctrine was explained by Harlan K. Ullman and James P. Wade in 1996 and was developed specifically for application by the US military by the National Defense University of the United States.

== Doctrine of rapid dominance ==
Rapid dominance is defined by its authors, Harlan K. Ullman and James P. Wade, as attempting

to affect the will, perception, and understanding of the adversary to fight or respond to our strategic policy ends through imposing a regime of Shock and Awe.

Further, rapid dominance will, according to Ullman and Wade,

impose this overwhelming level of Shock and Awe against an adversary on an immediate or sufficiently timely basis to paralyze its will to carry on ... [to] seize control of the environment and paralyze or so overload an adversary's perceptions and understanding of events that the enemy would be incapable of resistance at the tactical and strategic levels.

Introducing the doctrine in a report to the United States' National Defense University in 1996, Ullman and Wade describe it as an attempt to develop a post-Cold War military doctrine for the United States. Rapid dominance and shock and awe, they write, may become a "revolutionary change" as the United States military is reduced in size and information technology is increasingly integrated into warfare. Subsequent U.S. military authors have written that rapid dominance exploits the "superior technology, precision engagement, and information dominance" of the United States.

Ullman and Wade identify four vital characteristics of rapid dominance:

1. near total or absolute knowledge and understanding of self, adversary, and environment;
2. rapidity and timeliness in application;
3. operational brilliance in execution; and
4. (near) total control and signature management of the entire operational environment.

The term "shock and awe" is most consistently used by Ullman and Wade as the effect that rapid dominance seeks to impose upon an adversary. It is the desired state of helplessness and lack of will. It can be induced, they write, by direct force applied to command and control centers, selective denial of information and dissemination of disinformation, overwhelming combat force, and rapidity of action.

The doctrine of rapid dominance has evolved from the concept of "decisive force". Ulman and Wade contrast the two concepts in terms of objective, use of force, force size, scope, speed, casualties, and technique.

=== Civilian casualties and destruction of infrastructure ===
Although Ullman and Wade claim that the need to "[m]inimize civilian casualties, loss of life, and collateral damage" is a "political sensitivity [which needs] to be understood up front", their doctrine of rapid dominance requires the capability to disrupt "means of communication, transportation, food production, water supply, and other aspects of infrastructure", and, in practice, "the appropriate balance of Shock and Awe must cause ... the threat and fear of action that may shut down all or part of the adversary's society or render his ability to fight useless short of complete physical destruction."

Using as an example a theoretical invasion of Iraq 20 years after Operation Desert Storm, the authors claimed, "Shutting the country down would entail both the physical destruction of appropriate infrastructure and the shutdown and control of the flow of all vital information and associated commerce so rapidly as to achieve a level of national shock akin to the effect that dropping nuclear weapons on Hiroshima and Nagasaki had on the Japanese."

Reiterating the example in an interview with CBS News several months before Operation Iraqi Freedom, Ullman stated, "You're sitting in Baghdad and all of a sudden you're the general and 30 of your division headquarters have been wiped out. You also take the city down. By that I mean you get rid of their power, water. In 2, 3, 4, 5 days they are physically, emotionally and psychologically exhausted."

== Historical applications ==
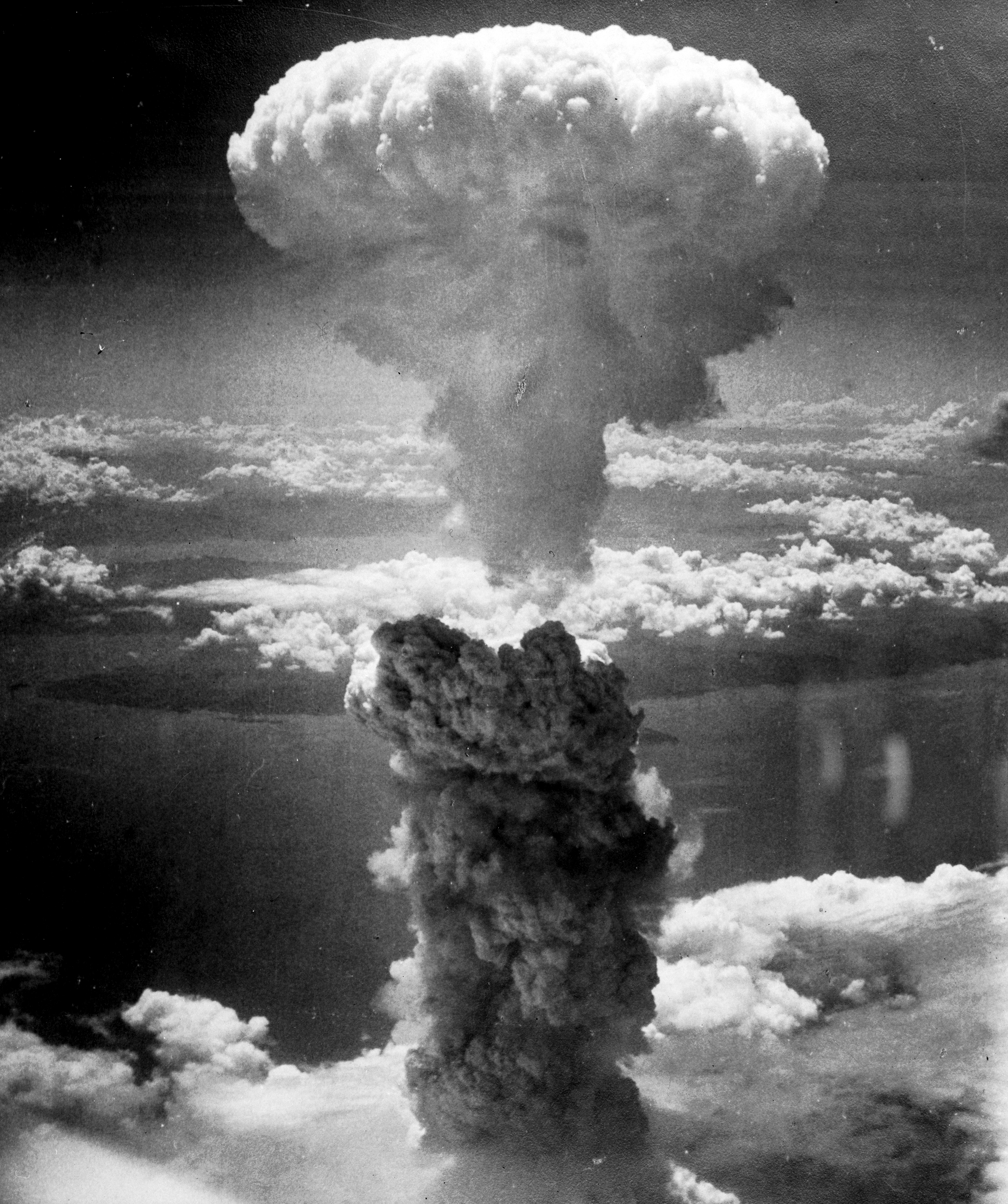
According to its original theorists, shock and awe renders an adversary unwilling to resist through overwhelming displays of power. Ullman cites the atomic bombings of Hiroshima and Nagasaki (Nagasaki is pictured) as an example of shock and awe.

Ullman and Wade argue that there have been military applications that fall within some of the concepts of shock and awe. They enumerate nine examples:

- Overwhelming force: The "application of massive or overwhelming force" to "disarm, incapacitate, or render the enemy militarily impotent with as few casualties to ourselves and to noncombatants as possible."
- Hiroshima and Nagasaki: The establishment of shock and awe through "instant, nearly incomprehensible levels of massive destruction directed at influencing society writ large, meaning its leadership and public, rather than targeting directly against military or strategic objectives even with relatively few numbers or systems."
- Massive bombardment: Described as "precise destructive power largely against military targets and related sectors over time."
- Blitzkrieg: The "intent was to apply precise, surgical amounts of tightly focused force to achieve maximum leverage but with total economies of scale."
- Sun Tzu: The "selective, instant beheading of military or societal targets to achieve shock and awe."
- Haitian example: This example (occasionally referred to as the Potemkin village example) refers to a martial parade staged in Haiti on behalf of the (then) colonial power France in the early 1800s in which the native Haitians marched a small number of battalions in a cyclical manner. This led the colonial power into the belief that the size of the native forces was large enough so as to make any military action infeasible.
- The Roman legions: "Achieving shock and awe rests in the ability to deter and overpower an adversary through the adversary's perception and fear of his vulnerability and our own invincibility."
- Decay and default: "The imposition of societal breakdown over a lengthy period, but without the application of massive destruction."

=== First Chechen War ===
Russia's military strategy in the First Chechen War, and particularly the Battle of Grozny, was described as "shock and awe."

=== Iraq War ===
==== Buildup ====
Before the 2003 invasion of Iraq, United States armed forces officials described their plan as employing shock and awe. However, Tommy Franks, commanding general of the invading forces, "had never cared for the use of the term 'shock and awe' " and "had not seen that effect as the point of the air offensive."

==== Conflicting pre-war assessments ====
Before its implementation, there was dissent within the Bush administration as to whether the shock and awe plan would work. According to a CBS News report, "One senior official called it a bunch of bull, but confirmed it is the concept on which the war plan is based." CBS Correspondent David Martin noted that during Operation Anaconda in Afghanistan in the prior year, the U.S. forces were "badly surprised by the willingness of al Qaeda to fight to the death. If the Iraqis fight, the U.S. would have to throw in reinforcements and win the old fashioned way by crushing the Republican Guards, and that would mean more casualties on both sides."

==== Campaign ====
Continuous bombing began on March 20, 2003, as United States forces unsuccessfully attempted to kill Saddam Hussein with decapitation strikes. Attacks continued against a small number of targets until March 21, 2003, when, at 1700 UTC, the main bombing campaign of the US and their allies began. Its forces launched approximately 1,700 air sorties (504 using cruise missiles). Coalition ground forces had begun a "running start" offensive towards Baghdad on the previous day. Coalition ground forces seized Baghdad on April 9, and the United States declared victory on April 15. The term "shock and awe" is typically used to describe only the very beginning of the invasion of Iraq, not the larger war, nor the ensuing insurgency.

==== Conflicting post-war assessments ====
To what extent the United States fought a campaign of shock and awe is unclear as post-war assessments are contradictory. Within two weeks of the United States' victory declaration, on April 27, The Washington Post published an interview with Iraqi military personnel detailing demoralization and lack of command. According to the soldiers, Coalition bombing was surprisingly widespread and had a severely demoralizing effect. When United States tanks passed through the Iraqi military's Republican Guard and Special Republican Guard units outside Baghdad to Saddam's presidential palaces, it caused a shock to troops inside Baghdad. Iraqi soldiers said there was no organization intact by the time the United States entered Baghdad and that resistance crumbled under the presumption that "it wasn't a war, it was suicide."

In contrast, in an October 2003 presentation to the United States House Committee on Armed Services, staff of the United States Army War College did not attribute their performance to rapid dominance. Rather, they cited technological superiority and "Iraqi ineptitude". The speed of the coalition's actions ("rapidity"), they said, did not affect Iraqi morale. Further, they said that Iraqi armed forces ceased resistance only after direct force-on-force combat within cities.

According to National Geographic researcher Bijal P. Trivedi, "Even after several days of bombing the Iraqis showed remarkable resilience. Many continued with their daily lives, working and shopping, as bombs continued to fall around them. According to some analysts, the military's attack was perhaps too precise. It did not trigger shock and awe in the Iraqis and, in the end, the city was only captured after close combat on the outskirts of Baghdad."

==== Criticism of execution ====
According to The Guardian correspondent Brian Whitaker in 2003, "To some in the Arab and Muslim countries, Shock and Awe is terrorism by another name; to others, a crime that compares unfavourably with September 11." Anti-war protesters in 2003 also claimed that "the shock and awe pummeling of Baghdad [was] a kind of terrorism."

==== Casualties ====
A dossier released by Iraq Body Count, a project of the U.K. non-governmental non-violent and disarmament organization Oxford Research Group, attributed approximately 6,616 civilian deaths to the actions of U.S.-led forces during the "invasion phase", including the shock-and-awe bombing campaign on Baghdad and other Iraqi cities.

These findings were disputed by both the U.S. military and the Iraqi government. Lieutenant Colonel Steve Boylan, the spokesman for the U.S. military in Baghdad, stated, "I don't know how they are doing their methodology and can't talk to how they calculate their numbers," as well as "we do everything we can to avoid civilian casualties in all of our operations." Trivedi stated, "Civilian casualties did occur, but the strikes, for the most part, were surgical."

=== 2026 Iran war ===
The opening of the 2026 Iran war, or Operation Epic Fury, reportedly dwarfed earlier examples of "shock and awe". According to the United States Central Command (CENTCOM), the first day alone was nearly double the scale of the United States' 2003 bombardment of Iraq. Within four days American forces had struck nearly 2,000 targets. Israel's air campaign has also been extremely intense. The Israel Defense Forces claimed roughly 1,000 targets hit each day. Among the targets were 17 ships, including an Iranian submarine.

== In popular culture ==
Following the 2003 invasion of Iraq by the US, the term "shock and awe" has been used for commercial purposes. The United States Patent and Trademark Office received at least 29 trademark applications in 2003 for exclusive use of the term. The first came from a fireworks company on the day the US started bombing Baghdad. Sony registered the trademark the day after the beginning of the operation for use in a video game title but later withdrew the application and described it as "an exercise of regrettable bad judgment."

In an interview, Harlan Ullman stated that he believed that using the term to try to sell products was "probably a mistake", and that "the marketing value will be somewhere between slim and none".

The 2007 American first-person shooter Call of Duty 4: Modern Warfare features a level entitled "Shock and Awe".

The 2017 film Shock and Awe takes its name from the concept and focuses on the 2003 invasion of Iraq.

== See also ==
- Demoralization (military)
- Hearts and minds (Iraq)
- Powell Doctrine
- Psychological warfare
- Rumsfeld Doctrine
- Terror (politics)
- London Blitz
- Blitzkrieg
