= James St Clair Wade =

British architect (born 1962)

James St Clair Wade (born 1962) is a retired British architect. He was educated at Shrewsbury School, and was a scholar at St John's College, Cambridge before attending Harvard University.

== Education ==
At Cambridge, he studied under by Eric Parry, Nicholas Hare and Peter Carl. He won the E. S. Prior Prize (1984). At Harvard, he was one of four subjects depicted by David Hockney in the Harvard Etching (1986).

== Work and recognition ==
His early work at Carline Fields, Shrewsbury, for Arrol Architects, was selected for inclusion in the Prince of Wales' A Vision of Britain (1989). As a team leader at Nicholas Hare Architects, he led educational projects at Benenden and Leighton Park schools.

His conservation work, whilst at Arrol Architects, has been recognised with the SPAB John Betjeman Award (2005) as well as a Georgian Group Award (Best Restoration of a Church, 2010). His newbuild work has also featured in the latest edition of Pevsner's The Buildings of England (2006). Whilst Senior Architect at Arrol Architects, he contributed to major schemes of restoration and repair at Lincoln Castle and York Minster. He has acted as an Assessor for The Register of Architects Accredited in Building Conservation.

As an illustrator, Wade has contributed to a number of books, including, with Charles Foster, a long-running series of caricatures to Shooting Times Magazine. Since 2019 he has been drawing Shrewsbury's historic streetscape in a systematic series of drawings. Shrewsbury Streetscape Project.
