= Fifth dimension operations =

Warfare complements the four classical dimensions: land, sea, air, and space

The fifth dimension of warfare complements the four classical dimensions: land, sea, air, and space. It was enunciated in 1995 as information operations.

This is part of core U.S. military doctrine, that recognizes at least five dimensions, or "domains of warfare" for which it is responsible:

- Land
- Sea
- Air
- Space
- Information

The origin of the concept of fifth dimension operations was a criticism that the "domain approach" reflected "a failure to think beyond the normal 'four' dimensions of threats, both domestic and international".

== Expansion of the concept ==
In more recent times, the concept of fifth dimension operations, as a concept under military operations, has taken a wider scope than its original information operations background, focusing on "the advanced space-time manipulating capabilities cyberspace offers". This development was begun as early as 1996, in regards to Advanced Battlespace and Cybermaneuver Concepts.

=== Historical analysis ===
The historical analysis used to justify the concept of fifth dimension operations being developed was the notion that:

- Land warfare was defined first by human energy (infantry) and then by animal energy (cavalry) in a three-dimensional medieval era, and then by mechanical energy in the four-dimensional modern era. The "battlespace is historically defined by three spatial dimensions {x, y, and z} and one temporal dimension {t}".
- The missing element is the fifth dimension – cyberspace, which is defined as both the "impact of the Internet and a stealth-masked terrorist on the advanced battlefield".

== 1995–1996 critique of information operations as a fifth domain approach ==
Core arguments used in the development of the concept of fifth dimension operations have been:

- The view that each of the five dimensions or domains – land, sea, air, space and information – should not be viewed as compartmentalized elements.
- The battlespace needs to be seen as an integrated whole, and operations carried out on multiple fronts, as a continuum of interrelated activities.

"there is now a technological solution – an approach that makes possible the feat of entering the opponent's decision making loop via the imaginative use of information technology. In the sense, its key contribution is that it conceptually presupposes that as we move into the Information Age new possibilities are realized as the ability to enter into the mind of the opponent becomes reality, not merely guessing at their motives and actions, but molding and directing them as well."

== Merging with the multidimensional battlespace ==
The concept of a five-dimensional operational space is based on the notion that there is a structural dimension to modern-day tactics and operational art, and that this has developed from the challenge posed by:

- Information age command and control (C2) technology, as well as command and influence (CI).
- Decentralized swarming, and irregular opponents
- A linguistic shift from "battleground" to "battlespace" recognizes the current reality of forces operating in a multidimensional battleground against complex opponents.

== Relationship to three-dimensional (3D) tactics analysis ==
The concept of fifth dimension operations is conceptually based on adding the "five-dimensional, holistic approach to warfare that uses the three dimensions of land, sea, and aerospace but also incorporates the temporal and cyber dimensions of warfare".

== Cyberwarfare/cyber-attack ==
A core technical component of fifth dimension operations is cyberwarfare, and cyber-attacks.

== Information warfare ==
Information warfare historically, has tended to be more developed under U.S. military doctrine, and tends to favour technology, and tends to extend into the realms of electronic warfare, cyber warfare, information assurance and computer network operations/attack/defense. Concurrently, a broader term of information operations has developed combining the making use of technology, as well as focusing on the more human-related aspects of information use, including social network analysis, decision analysis and the human aspects of command and control. This broader view has become the basis for fifth dimension operations.
