= Swarming (military) =

Battlefield tactic to saturate defences

Swarming is a battlefield tactic designed to maximize target saturation and thereby overwhelm or saturate the defences of the principal target or objective. Defenders can overcome attempts at swarming by launching counter-swarming measures that are designed to neutralize or otherwise repel such attacks.

Military swarming is often encountered in asymmetric warfare where opposing forces are not of the same size or capacity. In such situations, swarming involves the use of a decentralized force against an opponent in a manner that emphasizes mobility, communication, unit autonomy, and coordination or synchronization. Historically, military forces have used the principles of swarming without really examining them explicitly, but there is now active research in consciously examining military doctrines that draw ideas from swarming. In nature and nonmilitary situations, there are other various forms of swarming. Biologically driven forms are often complex adaptive systems, but have no central planning, simple individual rules, and nondeterministic behavior that may or may not evolve with the situation.

Current military explorations into swarming address the spectrum of military operations, from strategic through tactical. An expert group evaluated swarming's role in the "revolution in military affairs" or force transformation. They observed that military swarming is primarily tactical, sometimes operational, and rarely strategic; and is a complement to other efforts rather than a replacement for them. Swarming is a logical extension of network-centric warfare. At present, the networking for swarming is only available in specific contexts.

== Swarming in history ==
Swarming advocates sometimes apply it to situations that have superficial similarities, but really do not qualify as swarms. While swarms do converge on a target, not every military action, where multiple units attacked from all sides of a target, constitute swarming. Other conflicts, especially historical ones, fit a swarming paradigm, but the commanders involved did not use the concept. Nevertheless, historical examples help illustrate what modern analysts do and do not consider swarming.

Some historical examples with at least some aspect of swarming include:

=== Siege of Samarkand ===
At the siege of Samarkand, Spitamenes used Bactrian horse archers in effective swarming attacks against a relief column sent by Alexander the Great. Bactrian horse archers surrounded various Macedonian phalanxes, staying out of range of their melee weapons, and shot arrows until they had no more. The archers would then withdraw to a supply point, but another swarm of horse archers would sometimes replace them, and sometimes attack elsewhere. The Bactrians eventually caused the phalanx to break formation, and destroyed it. Alexander recognized his forces could not directly combat horse archers, but that the horse archers needed resupply of provisions, horses, and arrows. He split his forces into five columns and began building fortifications in the areas where the Bactrians had resupplied. Eventually, his anti-swarm tactics worked: cut off from resupply, the Bactrians had to meet the Macedonian phalanx, which were vastly superior in melee. Alexander made it priority to engage guerillas or other light mobile forces. Spitamenes was effective as long as his force were mobile, and he had adequate communications with mounted couriers. Once he was forced into direct battle with heavy forces, he lost the advantages of his forces and was defeated quickly. At the Battle of the Jaxartes River, Alexander once again faced swarming tactics from an army of Scythian horse archers. Alexander sent a unit of heavy cavalry ahead of his main line. As expected, the Scythian horsemen surrounded the detached cavalry. At the right moment, Alexander's cavalry reversed direction and pushed half of the Scythians straight into the main phalanx of Alexander's army, where they were slaughtered. Upon seeing this, the remaining half of the Scythian army retreated from the battle.

=== Mongols Horde ===
Mongols under Genghis Khan practiced an equivalent of swarming, partially because their communications, which used flags, horns, and couriers, were advanced for the time. Also, one of the standard tactics of Mongol military was the commonly practiced feigned retreat to break enemy formations and to lure small enemy groups away from larger groups and defended positions for ambush and counterattack. Genghis Khan used the Yam system, which established a rear line of points for supplies and for remounts of fast-moving couriers. The remount system allowed horsemen to move much faster than the couriers of opponents without them. These couriers kept the Mongol senior and subordinate commanders informed, such that they could make fast decisions based on current information. In modern terms, the courier system provided the means of getting inside the opponent's OODA loop. With fast communications, the Mongols could make decisions not just on what they could see locally, but with that information oriented within the overall situation. They could then decide and act while the enemy were still waiting for information. Outnumbered Mongols could beat larger forces by faster communications, which allowed units to withdraw and regroup while other groups continually stung the enemy, withdrew in turn, while the earlier group again hit the enemy.

== The evolution of modern swarming ==
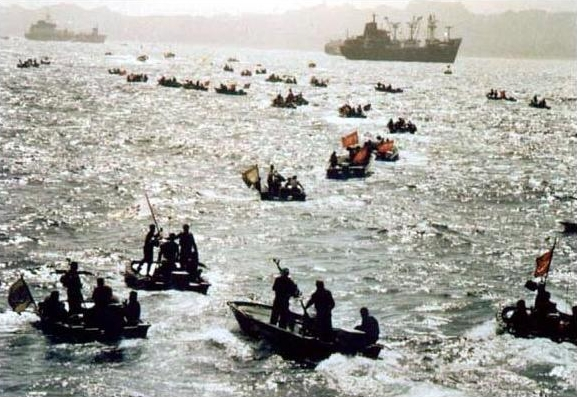
Iran–Iraq War's IRGC navy speedboats using swarm tactics

Swarming was present in the operations of Alexander the Great and Genghis Khan, but were generally replaced by melee and mass in the pre-industrial era. More synchronized manoeuvre was paced by the availability of mobile communications. Blitzkrieg was certainly a use of manoeuvre, but it was less flexible than later operations in which every tank and aircraft had radios, and far less flexible than forces that have effective networked information systems. They define swarming, in a military context, as "...seemingly amorphous, but it is a deliberately structured, coordinated, strategic way to strike from all directions, by means of a sustainable pulsing of force and/or fire, close-in as well as from stand-off positions."

One aspect of swarming is that it moves away from the traditional model of a rigid chain of command. David Alberts suggests abandoning the term command and control in favor of

- agility: "... the critical capability that organizations need to meet the challenges of complexity and uncertainty"
- focus: "provides the context and defines the purposes of the endeavor"
- convergence: "convergence is the goal-seeking process that guides actions and effects."

Agility is a characteristic of an organization or unit capable of swarming. Focus can be the designation of a goal by a higher-level commander, by a peer unit detecting a target, or by intelligence systems that feed information to the swarming units. Convergence is the key feature, which, while it can be distributed, causes swarming units to coordinate their actions, apply force, and know when to stop applying force.

Edwards holds that several axioms of military doctrine change with the use of swarming:

Edwards on principles of war changed by swarming
Traditional principle of war	Redefinition with swarming
Mass	Dispersed mass
Economy of force	Simultaneity
Unity of command	Unity of effort

Osgood points out that swarming is not new, although the means of coordination and synchronization are going through significant changes. Howard Rheingold cites mobile communications technology as a key enabler: Bees, as an example, sense each other's buzzing and instinctually move in concert in real time. Text messaging on mobile devices and instantaneous file sharing off the internet via PDAs allows groups of people to receive their instructions, move in unison, nearly instantaneously, without prior planning or forethought. And the technology allows groups to do so without a central leader. One modern example is the protesters at the World Trade Organization meetings in Seattle in 1999, who were able to orchestrate their movement effectively in this way.

== Modern military swarming ==
Current military applications of swarming combine the use of swarms: large numbers of relatively small agents or weapons, with synchronized actions, such that the swarm reacts faster than its opponent and defeats it. This section deals with general principles, but also high-intensity combat.

Swarming does not require good military intelligence alone, but intelligent soldiers who can manage multiple information streams and keep situational awareness. One of the challenges of designing modern networked systems is not to overwhelm the users with information. Those users will also need extensive training, with their sensing and synchronization information, to use them properly under combat stress.

Swarming requires autonomous or semi-autonomous operating agents, with strong synchronization and communications among them. Senior commanders release resources to the swarm, but do not control them once released. If the agents are semi-autonomous, there will be an on-scene commander giving general direction to the swarming agents.

=== A 1987 proposal ===
In the 1980s, the Soviets developed an 'Operational Maneuver Group' (OMG) for a fast armored thrust deep into NATO defences east of the Rhine River. An OMG was expected to exploit strategic surprise with a force equal or greater than an armored division, featuring up to 700 tanks, 500 IFVs, and a substantial number of helicopters. As a countermeasure, NATO considered neutron bombs, but their use was politically controversial. NATO instead devised a plan to slow the thrust with a swarming counterattack, called Dynamic Density, which used single-seat Small Military Aircraft (SMAs) operating autonomously in pairs with infantry ATGWs such as Milan, their pilots being infantry. One aircraft would carry the Milan post and four missiles, the other the night-vision sight and four missiles (two of which might be anti-helicopter), and the tactics would be shoot and scoot. The SMA, known as the Dragoon, was evaluated and highly praised by the MoD's test pilots at Boscombe Down, its STOL performance and ease of handling making it ideal for this role. Large numbers would be needed and 5,000 was suggested as sufficient to ensure that swarming would be successful against a force as large as an OMG. Once it was recognized that success could be claimed with a significant deceleration, other novelties were introduced, among which was Synthetic Density which required the SMAs to distribute pneumatic models (fitted with radar reflectors) of tanks and artillery along the OMG's MLA, these requiring the room to be put down and time to be lost before progress could be resumed.

The proposal was published in the Journal of the Royal United Service Institution and a couple of years later a shorter article suggested that if the Soviets themselves had used SMAs in swarms in Afghanistan, their COIN operations against the Mujaheddin would have been far more successful. Contemporary Western armies in Afghanistan can readily accept that swarming at the tactical and operational levels is appropriate, but the physical structure of the country rules out the currently available fighting vehicles. However, networked and swarming SMAs, again 5,000 in number, all armed with laser designators for the second echelon of conventional ground attack aircraft, would constitute force multipliers with a substantial impact.

=== Improved decision-making as a force multiplier ===
Swarming ties in well with the theories of the military strategist John Boyd, the "high-low mix" in which a large number of less expensive aircraft, coupled with a small number of extremely capable "silver bullet" aircraft, had the effect of a much larger force. Boyd's concept of quick action is based on the repeated application of the Boyd loop, consisting of the steps

- Observe: make use of the best sensors and other intelligence available
- Orient: put the new observations into a context with the old
- Decide: select the next action based on the combined observation and local knowledge
- Act: carry out the selected action, ideally while the opponent is still observing your last action.

Boyd's concept is also known as the OODA Loop, and is applicable to all military operations, as well as to civilian competition from sports to business.

These are a realization of Boyd's theories. A swarming case is any historical example in which the scheme of manoeuvre involves the convergent attack of five (or more) semiautonomous (or autonomous) units on a targeted force in some particular place. "Convergent" implies an attack from most of the points on the compass."

=== Saturation of air defenses ===
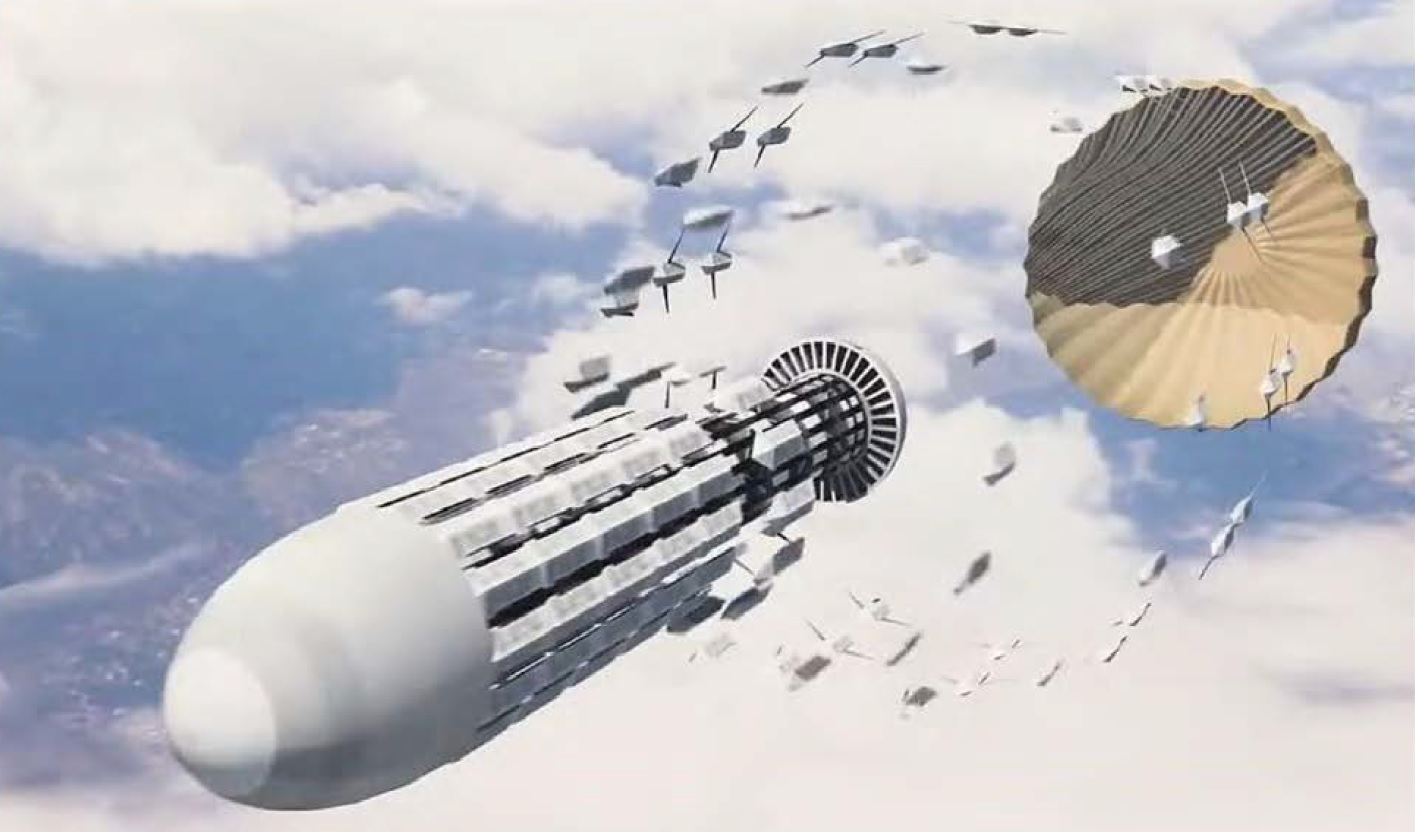
Mass launch of a swarm of miniature decoys from an airdropped canister. (Air Force Research Laboratory concept illustration)

Due to the vulnerability of sophisticated air defense systems such as S-300 and S-400 to mass attacks from low flying cruise missiles, it is thought that swarm tactics are well suited for Suppression of Enemy Air Defenses (SEAD) missions using swarms of networked miniature spoofing decoy drones accompanying large numbers of JASSM-ER cruise missiles launched from mass fire platforms such as Rapid Dragon.

=== Swarming avoids fratricide ===
Prevention of fratricide, as well as the ability to make ad hoc swarming attacks on targets of opportunity, is one of the major goals of combat data networking among units down to the level of individual tanks and soldiers. Blue Force Tracker is an early vehicle-level synchronization system, also operating in helicopters. These systems are still new and undergoing considerable improvement. One fratricide incident in Afghanistan came from the users not understanding that their target designation device reinitialized, after battery replacement, to the position of their designator, not of the target. If the bomber had a beacon that gave the crew the precise location of the friendly troops, that would have been another way of avoiding attacking one's own troops.

== Modern militaries and lower-intensity conflict ==
Alternatively, the US and other major powers may go to a more cooperative model, as in the foreign internal defense mission of special forces. In that model, which needs extensive lead time, the major power uses nonmilitary and military means to increase the capability of the host nation to resist insurgency.

Foreign internal defense includes the economic stabilization of host countries. In Thomas Barnett's paradigm, the world is divided into a "connected core" of nations enjoying a high level of communications among their organizations and individuals, and those nations that are disconnected internally and externally. In a reasonably peaceful situation, he describes a "system administrator" force, often multinational, which does what some call "nation-building", but, most importantly, connects the nation to the core and empowers the natives to communicate—that communication can be likened to swarm coordination.

Swarming is not a panacea for conflict at all levels. If there is a significant military force preventing the system administrator from working on developing connections, the other part of the paradigm comes into play: the leviathan, a first-world military force that takes down the opposition regular forces. Leviathan is not constituted to fight local insurgencies, but major forces. Leviathan may use extensive swarming at the tactical level, but its dispatch is a strategic decision that may be made unilaterally, or by an established core group such as NATO, ASEAN, or the United Nations.

It is typically the responsibility of the system administrator force to deal with low-level conflict, and there must be both resources and a smooth transition plan from Leviathan to System Administrator. A classic example was Operation Rankin, which developed several plans of how to manage control in North-Western Europe should the Nazi power unconditionally surrender, withdraw from occupied countries, or suffer a greatly weakened resistance. This was more a mission suitable to a policing organization, such as a militarized force similar to the Constabulary during the post-WWII occupation of Germany.

Swarming would allow major powers to rapidly respond to guerrilla forces, but, given the appropriate synchronization and communications, the less powerful forces can use swarming themselves. Modern communications allows military units to stay widely dispersed. The front, rear and flanks are disappearing from military conflict. Swarming allows the military to fight everywhere.

=== Swarming and Third World nations ===
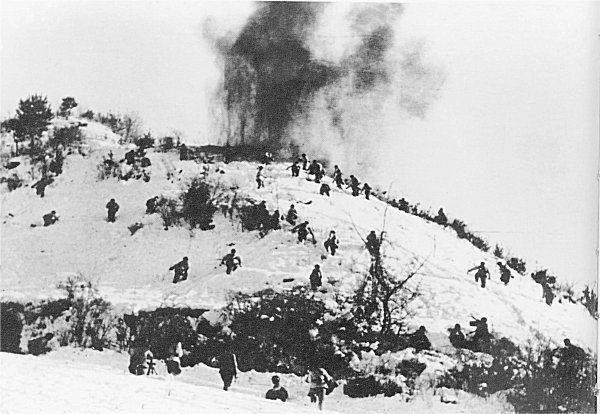
Chinese soldiers swarm a UN-held position during the decisive Battle of the Cheongcheon River in the Korean War.

Swarming is advantageous to less powerful countries and groups, because it allows them to balance their disadvantage in firepower and numbers. Despite being less technically advanced, Communist forces made good use of swarming in Asia during the Cold War. The Chinese were able to make up for their lack of firepower by attacking from all sides and then quickly advancing to the rear. The Vietcong were famous from attacking from all directions out of nowhere and then quickly disappearing. When they did come into close contact, they used a technique called "hugging the belt", which meant they were too close for the US to employ air and artillery support. If the attackers "hugged" at several points, "pulsing" their attacks, they both neutralized external fire support, but also made it difficult for the US commander to know where to commit reserves.

=== Swarming principles in terrorism ===
Cordesman observes that swarming is a viable terrorist tactic against targets of opportunity. Al-Qaeda, for example, uses a different form of swarming than those of advanced militaries, in which the general objectives of operational cells are agreed in a manner coordinated, but not continuously controlled by the core organization. Once the decision has been made on the general targets, the operational cells cut positive control links from the core, although they may still receive financial and other support. A signature of al-Qaeda operations has been multiple, near-simultaneous attacks, such as the several hijacked airliners in the 9/11 attacks, the closely spaced bombings aimed at US embassies in Tanzania and Kenya, and attacks on buses and trains in London. The attacks on trains in Spain had an additional dimension: not all the swarms were associated with al-Qaeda.

While John Arquilla, a professor at the Naval Postgraduate School, cites the ability to plan separate and widely dispersed attacks, coordinated by mobile communications that might originate from a cave on the Afghan-Pakistan border, he does not emphasize the apparent al-Qaeda technique of releasing operational units to local control, once the policy is set. See Clandestine HUMINT operational techniques.

The apparent al-Qaeda methodology of letting operational cells decide on their final dates and means of attack exhibit an operational pattern, but not a periodicity that could easily be used for an indications checklist appropriate for a warning center. Such lists depend on seeing a local pattern to give a specific warning.

Semiautonomous swarming, in which the actors occasionally interfere with one another, is seen in attacks on computer networks by loose confederations of malicious hackers. On occasion, especially when the attack uses a botnet, some of the units may try to overpower and control one another, as well as the target. One of the observations of the Center on Terrorism and Irregular Warfare was that unfocused mass disruption was not a useful terrorist, and by extension general military, tactic. The 9/11 attacks had symbolism. A cyberattack on a stock market would have symbolism. For the political purposes of the swarm, there has to be a symbol to which observers need to connect the purpose of the attack.

== See also ==
- C4ISTAR
- Defeat in detail
- Battle of annihilation
- Three-Dimensional (3D) Tactics Analysis
- Cabbage tactics
- Swarm intelligence
