= Networked swarming warfare =

The concept of networked swarming warfare was first proposed by HUO Dajun in 2003. The key feature of the Information Age is the networking of organizational structure. The rising networked organization will overcome the limitation of traditional geography and link the operational resources distributed widely to form a military action network which combine strike range, speed and lethality, three elements of originally different developing, fundamentally transforming our idea of battle space. With the trend of decentralization of forces, we need to develop more small units with independent combat functions; meanwhile we can join these small units into a whole network as the technology's development. The warfare based on this network is called networked swarming warfare.

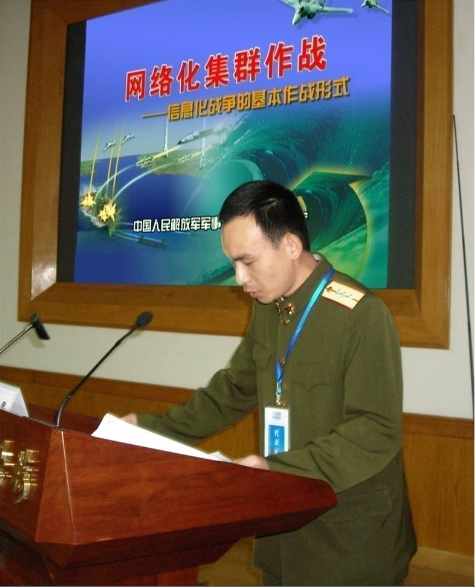

== Definition ==
Networked swarming warfare (NSW) is the wide-scope maneuver warfare to attack dynamically the enemy in parallel by flexible utilization of "assembly" and "dispersion", which integrates the multiple forces distributed widely into the operational network with obvious flowing feature in a multi-dimensional space. It provides us with a networked form of operations which allows organizational flowing that amount of dispersed combat units on battlefield could rapidly formulate the operational swarms which centering on objectives and rebuild according to the requirements of battlefield environment.

== Connotations ==
- For the organization of forces, supported by information technology, abide by the networking logic of organizational structure，it can integrate multiple operational resources dispersed widely into an intact force network to achieve information interaction, functional coupling and capabilities clustering.
- For the deployment of forces, in form of nonlinear deployment with multidimensional space, NSW is the greatly dispersed, flexible and irregular deployment and changes the mode of "deploying before striking", focusing on deploying during the moving and the combination of deployment and attacks, and dominating the situation development by flexible maneuvering, stop and dash, dispersion and assembly.
- In space distribution, NSW emphasizes mobile and dispersed in wide-scope space.
- In time distribution, NSW is non-sequential and conducts parallel operations to the common target or a series of interrelated targets.
- In patterns of operations, it adopts the method of dispersed deployment of forces and dynamic assembling of operations by combinations of small combat units with rapid assembly and dispersion which similar to the pattern of "long-range raid".

== Features ==
Networked swarming warfare has three essential features:

- Organizational flowing

On informationized battlefield, the flowing of elements of combat effectiveness would be further strengthened, which is the inevitable result of the combination of dispersion and fast pace. The mutual influence and integration of network space and traditional geographic space make the flow of force, firepower, information and organizational interaction become the dominant advantage of warfare in information age. "Clustering forces by flowing" become its fundamental form. To adapt to these requirements, we do not only need the flow of force, firepower and information but also the flowing of organizational structure, that is to say, a flexible and dynamic force structure. To some extent, as an objective-oriented organization, NSW unite the operational elements and units in different fields into a military network according to the operational objectives, once the objectives be achieved it would be dispersed immediately and rebuild according to new objectives. Hence, NSW is an organizational form of forces based on overall reflection and flexibility, achieves the integration of flow of material forces and information by efficient coordination. Like an amoeba, it can continuously change its shapes according to the changes of living environment. During the operations, led by objectives and supported by information network, mobilize material flow and force flow by information flow, the widely dispersed combat units on battlefield can rapidly formulate the combat swarms centered on targets and rebuild according to the changes of battlefield environment.

The organizational flowing can ensure the immediate reflection and flexibility of the whole operational system; appropriately seize the opportunity for battle: and transfer the tasks to make the operational forces and tasks be best matched with each other. All the combat units dynamically change their roles in reconnaissance, strike and containment and realize the dominance of battlefield by the high-flexible form of operations. NSW is conducted in space of flows. "The flows in network change with time that neither the flows nor network are unalterable, they both reveal the forms of changes of adaptation in time and experience accumulation". To complete the dynamic assembly of operational forces in flowing, we need to explore and seize the opportunity for battle promptly in the complicated and changeable battlefield environment, center on objectives and unite the appropriate operational forces together to form an operational network and concentrate and release the effectiveness in flowing to achieve the operational objectives. Meanwhile, organizational flowing is inevitably based on flexibility to adapt to the rapid changes on the battlefield. That is also the necessity of information technology paradigm, that is to say, "information technology paradigm is based on flexibility", that is one of the decisive features of social organizations characterized as changeable and flowing. Similar to dynamic rebuilding capability of enterprises in information age, "flexible" organizations can better adapt to the rapid changes of future battlefield, has quick adaptability and relatively stable operational efficiency. The key is information flowing, with constitution of organizational structure in favor of information flowing, it can strengthen the overall and multi-channel communication and connection, and promote overall adaptability, reflection and sustainability.

- Objective-centered

Liddell Hart figured out that "although be a generic term, 'objective' is not a perfect word. It has some material and geographical meaning which makes it easy to cause the confusion of thoughts." Usually called objective, is the expected result of military actions, stipulates a common direction for various operational forces and actions. To some extent, objective here is the relatively abstract objective. But in the future warfare, objective of the military actions would be largely associated with the military targets; sometimes we may make definition and identification directly by military targets. In this sense, objective would have some material and geographical meaning, refers to the possible entity or object to be attacked or treated with some other actions. In the past, due to the limitations of technology and maneuvering capability, the relative location changes of the targets were relatively slow and the targets and combat areas usually tied with each other; tasks distribution and coordination for different operational groups usually clarified by combat areas or battle lines. While NSW's establishment is centered on flows, represents a dynamic space idea, operations of NSW are not limited to small geographical area any more but flows on wider battlefield. Therefore, in form of organizational coordination, NSW emphasizes the center of objective, that is to say, make precise deployment and coordination in accordance with the specific targets and points, distribute the targets to various operational groups or units, and command the whole operation by the control of specific targets of different durations and phases. The core idea of NSW is centered on objective; it is nonlinear operation in essence and smashes the traditional pattern of horizontally pushing from front to back that the whole operational process is led, designed and commanded by objective. With the investigation of the inter-connection of various elements of the enemy, start from the key nodes, select the targets that best serving for the objective achievement and be most favorable to disturb the integrated deployment of the enemy. NSW, having changed the traditional forms of tasks distribution and coordination organizing according to zones, weakening the combat boundary line and main direction of attack, it make objective-oriented task distribution that based on target deployment, target-action and target- coordination organizing. It emphasizes more on target selection and operational deployment, the overall combat is led by objective and makes appropriate operational deployment around the achievement of objective also conduct coordination that centered on objectives. For specific coordination, distributes obvious tasks for each operational swarm (unit) and deadlines of task completion but leaves no specific methods or steps for task completion, so that centering on the objective and tasks the commanders at different levels can conduct relatively independent command and control according to the overall operational intention and practice on the battlefield. Such kind of coordination can better match with the requirements of organization flowing, maximize the information efficiency, being prompt, flexible and precise, so as to achieve the operational objectives with the most appropriate force and method.

To understand "objective-centered", we shall understand the relationship between the specific military targets and operational objective (purpose). NSW is to dynamically constitute a military operational network which centering on targets (operational objective) and organize the coordination centering on the objective (specific target), which is the opposite of traditional forms of tasks distribution and coordination organizing according to zones. While centering on objective, the combat shall not become the mechanical process of detailed information collecting of the strike targets and launching assault. If focuses too much on specific targets in tactics level but not objective or task, it may draw the attention of the commanders to tactics of weaponry and platform but not to the operational and strategic situation, which might lead to the war of attrition in operational or strategic level. As Liddell Hart said that objective is not a perfect word, to understand it we shall put it into various levels.

- Multi-directional maneuvering attacks

Emphasizing on multi-direction maneuvering attacks, NSW would rush forward to the enemy in multi-forms, from multi-positions and directions to achieve the unexpected attack purpose. "Multi-direction maneuvering attacks" aim to explore and create the weaknesses of the enemy, then conduct powerful strikes. In the future warfare, facing the three-dimensional, rapid and in-depth assaults of the powerful enemy, one can never win to play hard ball with the enemy by assembling the main forces assembly; it is necessary to use wide forces and firepower maneuvering to mobilize and pin down the enemy and deduct its overall structure to explore and create the weaknesses of the enemy. While pitting against each other, the two armies are always in different locations and the locations would be dynamically changed, that the opportunity for battle are just occurs at the moment of situation changing. That is the glamour of maneuvering. The precise maneuvering dominated by information can make the army be more flexible and be able to deploy troops on wider zones to make prompt attacks to the weakest position of the enemy, then to disrupt and dismantle the order and integration of the enemy. Emphasizing on winning by maneuvering does not mean to ignore the effect of firepower but to strike the balance between firepower and maneuvering, regard information and firepower as the insurance of maneuver conducting, then use firepower destroy the enemy by maneuvering. Nowadays, people pay too much attention to firepower and even emphasizing firepower at the expense of maneuvering, which would make the future warfare reach the situation of impasse and consumption. Though the view of winning by firepower is once common, by the analysis of war history, the advantage of winning by maneuvering is obvious and we Chinese army has fine tradition in maneuver warfare which shall not be lightly thrown away. Actually, the organic combination of information, maneuvering and firepower in information age has fundamentally changed the characteristics of firepower and maneuvering. A networked troop has the capability of dispersing into smaller combat units and the independent distributed combat units can make rapid multi-directional maneuvering and have the flexibility of synchronously using various kinds of firepower, that the mobility of battlefield is more apparent. Hence, the warfare in information age is formulated around flows; flows of forces, firepower, information and organizational interaction have become the dominant advantage of warfare in information age. In forces deployment and application, NSW strive for "a nonlinear attack dynamic enabled by distributed operations", that is to say, conduct attacks dynamically in multi-position, multi-line and multi-direction, be assembled during the moving, be assembled while striking the enemy, disperse immediately once the task be completed and seek next opportunity for battle. Dispersed deployed operational forces, by time synchronization and accelerated selection of targets, deploy assembly in time with the advantages in space to conduct multi-directional maneuvering attacks to the enemy. Achieve the surprise effect by multi-directional maneuvering attacks while keeping the multi-directional security with the surprise. Multi-directional maneuvering attacks aim to attack the weaknesses of the enemy surprisingly, destroy the mental and material cohesion of the enemy by surprise "precise maneuvering". By the application of speed advantage and flexibility of deployment, "identify actual situation of the enemy and initiate attack against the enemy's potential hazardous parts", analyze the strengths and weaknesses of the enemy in changing situation and then crack the connections to seize the dominance on battlefield.

== See also ==
- Network-centric warfare, a related United States-based theory

== Sources ==
- Huo Dajun. Study on Networked Swarming Warfare. Beijing: National Defense University Press. 2013. https://book.douban.com/subject/25929630/
- Michael Raska. PLA concepts of ‘Network Swarming Warfare’. https://asiatimes.com/article/chinas-evolving-cyber-warfare-strategies/
- CESA. La stratégie militaire chinoise de Networked Swarming Warfare. https://www.calameo.com/cesa/books/006940288b60ec3eb2105
- Romain Mielcarek. Networked Swarming Warfare : la guerre réseaucentrée revisitée par les Chinois. https://www.areion24.news/produit/dsi-hs-n-68/
- Hammad Waleed. From Firepower to Brainpower: The Revolution of Networked Warfare. https://defensetalks.com/from-firepower-to-brainpower-the-revolution-of-networked-warfare/
