= John Arquilla =

American analyst/academic of international relations

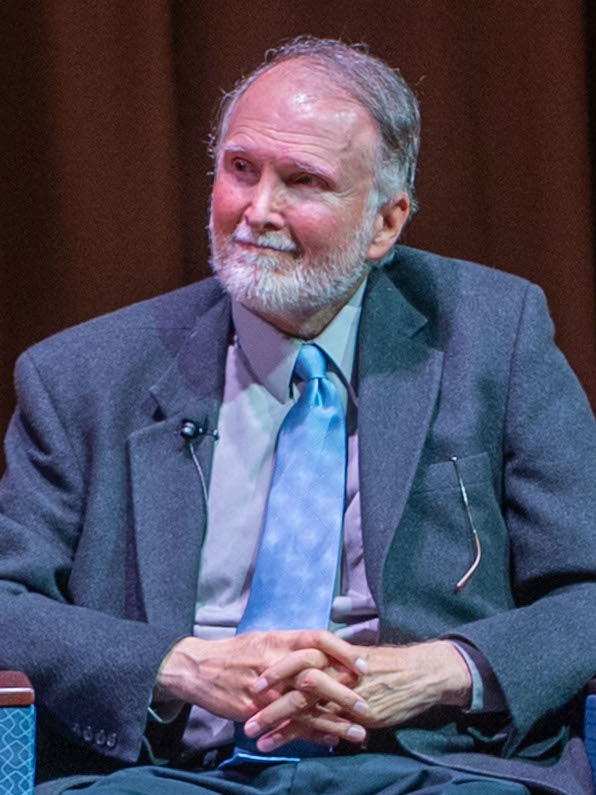
Arquilla facilitating a lecture at Naval Postgraduate School in 2025

John Arquilla (born 1954) is an American analyst and academic of international relations.

== Biography ==
Arquilla received a B.A. from Rosary College in 1975. Until 1987, he worked as a surety-bond executive. He then enrolled at Stanford University, where he studied Political Science, receiving the M.A. degree in 1989 and a Ph.D. in 1991.

From 1989, Arquilla also worked as analyst for RAND. In 1993, he joined the faculty of the US Naval Postgraduate School, where he has since taught courses in national security affairs and defense analysis, while keeping his post at Rand till 2003.

Arquilla worked as a consultant to General Norman Schwarzkopf during Operation Desert Storm (1991), as part of a group of RAND analysts assigned to him. During the Kosovo War (1998-1999) he assisted United States Deputy Secretary of Defense John Hamre on international information strategy. During the George W. Bush administration, Arquilla was one of many advisors to former Secretary of Defense Donald Rumsfeld (in office 2001-2006), who like Arquilla is an admirer of Andrew Marshall's RMA (Revolution in Military Affairs).

Arquilla has contributed op-eds to journals and publications such as The New York Times, Forbes, Foreign Policy magazine, The Atlantic Monthly, Wired and The New Republic.

Academically, he has developed the concept of netwar, or "swarm-tactics", referring to the particular fighting-style of network-organised groups. Networked cells can share precise information on a need-to-know basis without a hierarchical structure. This gives them the ability to disperse and "swarm" in an extremely effective manner, as witnessed in the 9/11 attacks.

Arquilla has promoted the idea of adapting militaries from a hierarchical structure to a network structure, suggesting that a network military will be the most able to defeat terrorist networks. He also points to the Roman concept of organized legions defeating the previous military paradigm of the phalanx. Likewise, terrorist networks have evolved while older Cold War militaries hold on to antiquated paradigms.

Arquilla's arguments for the US to use cyber war as an instrument of conflict prevention in areas such as South Asia, as described in a 2009 Wired article, have earned him criticism from Pakistani writers and web journals, such as TechLahore.

Arquilla supports preemptive war and NSA wiretapping as antiterrorist methods: "the fact that preemption can only function on the basis of accurate insight should make the case for governments around the world to continue to amass and employ big data to search out the small cells that bedevil our era".

== Works ==
- Bitskrieg: The New Challenge of Cyberwarfare (Polity, 2021).
- Why the Axis Lost: An Analysis of Strategic Errors (McFarland, 2020).
- Afghan Endgames: Strategy and Policy Choices for America’s Longest War (Georgetown, 2012).
- Insurgents, Raiders, and Bandits: How Masters of Irregular Warfare Have Shaped Our World (Rowman, 2011).
- Three Circles of War: Understanding the Dynamics of Conflict in Iraq (Potomac Books, 2010).
- Worst Enemy: The Reluctant Transformation of the American Military (Ivan R. Dee, 2008).
- Information Strategy and Warfare (Routledge, 2007).
- The Reagan Imprint: Ideas in American Foreign Policy from the Collapse of Communism to the War on Terror(2006).
- Networks and Netwars: The Future of Terror, Crime, and Militancy (National Defense Research Institute, 2001).
- In Athena's Camp: Preparing for Conflict in the Information Age (RAND, 1997).
- From Troy to Entebbe: Special Operations in Ancient & Modern Times (University Press of America, 1996).
- Dubious Battles: Aggression, Defeat and the International System (Crane Russak, 1992).

== See also ==
- Cyber-terrorism
- Cyberwar
- Information warfare
- Noopolitik
