= Tactics of terrorism =

The tactics of terrorism can range from simple to complex, obscure to widely used, conventional to otherwise.

Terrorist tactics tend to favor attacks that avoid effective countermeasures and exploit vulnerabilities. Conventional tactics include shootings, hijackings, kidnappings, bombings, and suicide attacks. More unconventional tactics are rare or only theorized: bioterrorism, agroterrorism, nuclear terrorism, and cyberterrorism.

As important as the actual attacks is the cultivation in the target population of the fear of such attacks, so that the threat of violence becomes as effective as actual violence.

== Cyberterrorism ==
Cyberterrorism refers to the use of computer technology by terrorists to carry out attacks that cause harm to people, property, or critical infrastructure. One of the most common tactics used by cyberterrorists is the deployment of viruses and malware to disrupt computer systems, steal sensitive information, or cause physical damage.

Viruses and malware are malicious software programs designed to damage, disrupt, or gain unauthorized access to computer systems. They can be distributed through email attachments, infected websites, or other methods, and can have a range of impacts on a victim's computer system or network. Some of the most common types of malware include trojans, worms, and ransomware.

Terrorists can use viruses and malware to achieve a variety of goals, including stealing sensitive information, disrupting critical infrastructure, and causing physical harm. For example, a cyberattack on a power grid or transportation system could cause widespread disruptions and potentially harm people. Preventing and mitigating cyberterrorism requires a range of strategies, including increasing awareness of the risks of cyberattacks, implementing robust cybersecurity measures, and developing response plans in the event of an attack. Governments and private organizations must work together to develop effective prevention and response strategies to mitigate the risk of cyberterrorism.The use of viruses and malware by cyberterrorists poses a serious threat to national and international security. Understanding the tactics and techniques used by cyberterrorists is essential for developing effective prevention and mitigation strategies.

Other examples of cyber attacks include phishing, which can be used as a means to retrieve data from an individual via email. These emails use the practices of social engineering to gain the trust of others, and persuade them to follow the attachment or to send money, both intended to sound of an urgent nature. The attachment typically contains malware or a virus. Social engineering is a technique in which online perpetrators use manipulation in order to gain access to information. This can manifest into countless different scenarios from people claiming to be homeless and in need of assistance, to people claiming to be a part of reputable charity organizations. Both phishing and social engineering use wording, pictures, and email signatures that appear to be legitimate.

In the developing age of information technology, many political scientists and prominent government officials have become increasingly concerned about the ability of terrorist groups to execute cyber attacks and states’ vulnerabilities to these attacks. Cyberterrorism has proven itself to become an increasingly desirable tactic for terrorist groups, given that they can be executed thousands of miles away from the target and are difficult to trace back to the perpetrator. In an October 2012 speech, United States Secretary of Defense Leon Panetta described the seriousness of a cyber attack on the United States: “A cyber attack perpetrated by nation states or violent extremists groups could be as destructive as the terrorist attack of 9/11. Such a destructive cyber terrorist attack could paralyze the nation.” The term “cyberterrorism” was first coined by Barry Collin, a senior research fellow at the Institute for Security and Intelligence in California, in the 1980s. The Center for Strategic and International Studies defines cyberterrorism as “the use of computer network tools to shut down critical national infrastructures (such as energy, transportation, government operations) or to coerce or intimidate a government or civilian population.” Many experts believe that new vulnerabilities will be created as nations and their critical infrastructures become more dependent on computer networks for their operation.

While concern is growing, cyberterrorism attacks still largely remain hypothetical, especially in the United States. In his report for the Center for Strategic and International Studies, James A Lewis writes that so far cyberterrorism has meant little more than propaganda and intelligence collection, and that no critical infrastructures have ever been shut down by cyber terrorist attacks. Lewis also describes how terrorist groups like Al-Qaeda have made significant use of the Internet, but only as a tool for intra-group relations, fundraising, and public relations. An Al-Qaeda training manual entitled “Military Studies in the Jihad Against the Tyrants” explicates that explosives are the preferred weapon of terrorists because “explosives strike the enemy with sheer terror and fright.” While explosions are dramatic, strike fear into the hearts of opponents, and do lasting damage, cyber attacks, like some other types of terrorism tactics, simply do not have the same dramatic and political effect that terrorists seek. Some political scientists, like Lewis, argue that terrorist organizations like Al-Qaeda might use cyber attacks to disrupt emergency services in order to reinforce and multiply the effect of a physical attack.

== Bombings ==
As a consequence of globalisation, the relative ease of access to the chemicals used to make explosives has made improvised explosive devices (IEDs) increasingly prominent. This has the dual effect of increasing the available firepower of terrorists who are generally far weaker than their targets as well as assuring the publicity necessary to attract sympathisers to their cause.

These may be implanted in buildings or placed in public spaces planted on the roadside to detonate near target vehicles, or even strapped to the bodies of individuals for suicide attacks. From a tactical perspective, each of these methods has positives and drawback; for instance, while a suicide vest has a much smaller payload than some other bombs, it may allow the wearer access to spaces and individuals that other forms cannot.

Suicide terrorism is the most aggressive form of terrorism, pursuing coercion even at the expense of losing support among terrorists' own community. What distinguishes a suicide terrorist is that the attacker does not expect to survive a mission and often employs a method of attack that requires the attacker's death in order to succeed (such as planting a car bomb, wearing a suicide vest, or ramming an airplane into a building). In essence, a suicide terrorist kills others at the same time that he kills himself. Usually these tactics are used for demonstrative purposes or as targeted assassinations. In most cases though, they target to kill a large number of people. Thus, while coercion is an element in all terrorism, coercion is the paramount objective of suicide terrorism.

The number of attacks using suicide tactics has grown from an average of fewer than five per year during the 1980s to 180 per year between 2000 and 2005, and from 81 suicide attacks in 2001 to 460 in 2005. These attacks have been aimed at diverse military and civilian targets, including in Sri Lanka, in Israel since July 6, 1989, in Iraq since the US-led invasion of that country in 2003, and in Pakistan and Afghanistan since 2005.

Between 1980 and 2000, the largest number of suicide attacks was carried out by separatist Liberation Tigers of Tamil Eelam of Sri Lanka. The number of attacks conducted by LTTE was almost double that of nine other major extremist organizations.

In Israel, Gaza and the West Bank, suicide bombings are an anti-Israel strategy perpetrated generally by Islamist and occasionally by secular Palestinian groups including the PFLP.

India has also been the victim of suicide attacks by groups based in Pakistan, a recent example taking place in February 2019. An attack by the Pakistan-based Jaish-e-Mohammed group on Indian security forces Pulwama district of Jammu and Kashmir, India, resulted in the loss of 40 security personnel of the CRPF. This eventually resulted in the India–Pakistan border skirmishes of 2019.

== Shootings ==
Assassinations

Despite the popular image of terrorism as bombings alone, conventional firearms are as much if not more pervasive in their use for extremism. Assassinations while not the number one tactic, are extremely commonly used to further terrorist agendas. Not only this but the frequency and number of assassinations by terrorist organizations is far larger than any other group/perpetrator(s). More often than not, these assassinations target political figures but this is not always the case. For example, the recent case (2020) of Samuel Paty, in which a teacher in France was beheaded over his lesson that included caricatures of the prophet Muhamed.

Mass Shootings

Shootings also take the form of less targeted but far more deadly mass shootings. Terrorists often use this tactic to employ fear as generally the targets are civilian or military and get mass amounts of media coverage. Often these mass shootings are carried out by only a singular terrorist or a small group but generally they require less man power for more damage. Yet another reason they are such a popular tactic. In the second part of the 2011 Norway attacks, 69 people were killed by Anders Behring Breivik, a man armed with two guns. Additionally In 2016, Omar Mateen killed 49 people with firearms during Orlando nightclub shooting. More recently we have seen a rise in mass shootings from lone-wolf terrorists as well.

== Suicide attacks ==
Suicide terrorism is the most aggressive form of terrorism, pursuing coercion even at the expense of losing support among terrorists' own community. What distinguishes a suicide terrorist is that the attacker does not expect to survive a mission and often employs a method of attack that requires the attacker's death in order to succeed (such as planting a car bomb, wearing a suicide vest, or ramming an airplane into a building). In essence, a suicide terrorist kills others at the same time that he kills himself. Usually these tactics are used for a demonstrative purposes or to targeted assassinations. In most cases though, they target to kill a large number of people. Thus, while coercion is an element in all terrorism, coercion is the paramount objective of suicide terrorism.

The number of attacks using suicide tactics has grown from an average of fewer than five per year during the 1980s to 180 per year between 2000 and 2005, and from 81 suicide attacks in 2001 to 460 in 2005. These attacks have been aimed at diverse military and civilian targets, including in Sri Lanka, in Israel since July 6, 1989, in Iraq since the US-led invasion of that country in 2003, and in Pakistan and Afghanistan since 2005.

Between 1980 and 2000, the largest number of suicide attacks was carried out by separatist Liberation Tigers of Tamil Eelam of Sri Lanka. The number of attacks conducted by LTTE was almost double that of nine other major extremist organizations.

In Israel, Gaza and the West Bank, suicide bombings are an anti-Israel strategy perpetrated generally by Islamist and occasionally by secular Palestinian groups including the PFLP.

India has also been the victim of suicide attacks by groups based in Pakistan, a recent example taking place in February 2019. An attack by the Pakistan-based Jaish-e-Mohammed group on Indian security forces Pulwama district of Jammu and Kashmir, India, resulted in the loss of 40 security personnel of the CRPF. This eventually resulted in the India–Pakistan border skirmishes of 2019.

== Projectile attacks ==
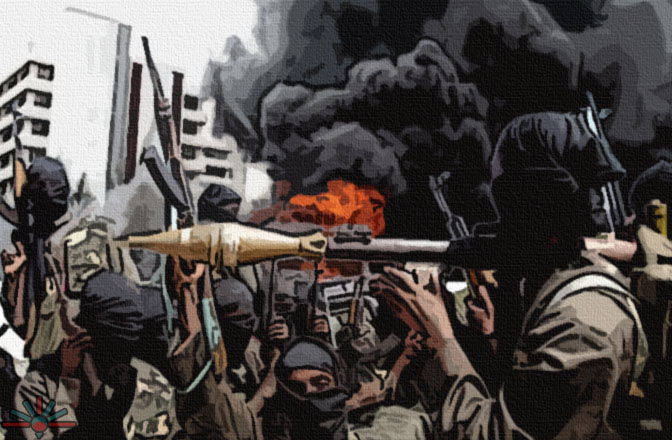
Boko Haram a known terrorist group using RPGs.

Projectiles attacks are attacks that use rockets or mortars in order to bomb their intended target. Rocket and mortar attacks had been widely used from 1982 to 2012, in the example of the middle east rocket attacks against cities and settlements had been carried out by political entities such as Hezbollah and Hamas (not counted as state terrorism) and to non political organization such as Palestinian Islamic Jihad, al-Qaeda and many others. Rocket-propelled grenades, especially RPG-7, and hand grenades, are in widespread use by terrorist groups.

The number of attacks using explosive projectiles has grown as can be seen in Palestinian rocket attacks on Israel, according to the reports somewhere between 800,000 people to million and a half are being in direct danger of mortar and missile range. In research published in 2011, 15,000 people had been treated or need treatment for PTSD and 1,000 people are being treated in psychometric facilities due to reasons directly to mortar (qassam) and rocket attacks (Grad).

== Vehicle-based attacks ==
Vehicle-based attacks have become an increasingly common tactic used by terrorists to cause destruction, chaos, and mass casualties. This tactic involves using vehicles, such as cars, trucks, and airplanes, as weapons to ram into crowds of people or to detonate explosives in crowded areas. While vehicle-based attacks have been used for decades, they have become more prevalent in recent years, particularly in Europe and the United States. This has prompted authorities to develop new strategies to prevent and mitigate these attacks, including physical security measures, technological solutions, and public education campaigns.

Understanding the history, tactics, and prevention strategies related to vehicle-based attacks is crucial for ensuring public safety and security.Terrorist tactics with vehicle-based attacks involve using cars, trucks, airplanes, and other vehicles as weapons to cause mass casualties and destruction. These attacks have become more prevalent in recent years, and terrorists have used a variety of vehicles to carry out their attacks.

=== Cars ===
Cars are a common vehicle used in terrorist attacks. They can be easily rented or stolen, making them an attractive option for terrorists who want to carry out an attack quickly and with minimal planning. Car bombs involve loading a vehicle with explosives and parking it in a crowded area before detonating the bomb remotely or through a suicide attacker. Car rammings involve using a car to drive into a crowd of people, causing chaos and harm.

=== Trucks ===
Trucks are larger and more powerful than cars, making them more effective weapons for terrorists. Truck bombs involve loading a large truck with explosives and parking it in a crowded area before detonating the bomb remotely or through a suicide attacker. Truck rammings involve using a truck to drive into a crowd of people, causing even more destruction than a car ramming.

=== Airplanes ===
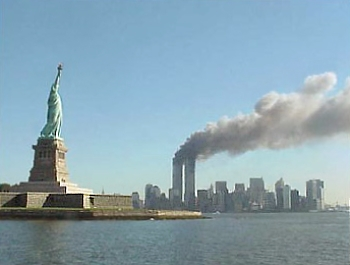
9/11 Attacks with Hijacked Airplanes.

Airplanes have also been used as weapons in terrorist attacks. Airplane hijackings involve taking control of a commercial aircraft and using it as a weapon or negotiating for political demands. This tactic was used in the 9/11 attacks in the United States, where terrorists hijacked four planes and crashed them into various targets, including the World Trade Center and the Pentagon.

=== Boats ===
Boats have been used in a variety of terrorist attacks, such as smuggling weapons or explosives. They can also be used to carry out attacks on ships or other waterborne targets. In 2000, the USS Cole was attacked by terrorists who used a small boat to carry out a suicide attack, killing 17 sailors and injuring many more.

=== Prevention and Mitigation ===
Efforts to prevent and mitigate vehicle-based attacks involve a range of measures, such as physical security measures, technological solutions, and public education. Physical security measures can include barriers, bollards, and other physical obstructions to prevent vehicles from entering pedestrian areas. Technological solutions can include the use of CCTV, facial recognition, and other technologies to identify potential threats and respond quickly to an attack. Public education can include providing guidance on how to respond in the event of an attack and training emergency responders to respond effectively.

== Chemical and biological weapons ==
Bio-Terrorism

Bioterrorism is the deliberate release of viruses, bacteria, or other germs (agents) used to cause illness or death in people, animals, or plants. Biological agents are typically found in nature, but it is possible that they can be mechanically altered to increase their ability to cause disease, make them resistant to current medicines, or to increase their ability to be spread into the environment. Biological agents in the hands of terrorists pose serious threats to states’ security because they can be easily spread through the air, through water, and through food, often unknowingly. Biological agents can also be difficult to detect and often do not cause illness for several hours to several days.

A use of chemical weapons includes the infamous example by Aum Shinrikyo, in which a Japanese "new religious movement", which in 1995 carried out the Sarin gas attack on the Tokyo subway. Ian Davison, a British white supremacist and neo-Nazi who was arrested in 2009 for planning terrorist attacks involving ricin poison. In 2011 the United States government discovered information that terrorist groups were attempting to obtain large amounts of castor beans for weaponized ricin use.

A prominent example of a bioterrorist attack on the United States is the September 2001 anthrax attacks. On September 18, 2001, several letters containing anthrax were sent to media outlets and the U.S. Congressional offices of Senator Thomas Daschle and Senator Patrick Leahy. Five Americans died from anthrax inhalation as a result of contact with the contaminated mail. While the 2001 anthrax attacks did not effect many people, the United States government has since taken several steps to pass legislation and enforce other initiatives aimed at better protecting the United States against biological attacks, improving the United States’ public health system, and improving the United States ability to respond to biological attacks.

== Agro Terrorism ==
A subset of bioterrorism, agroterrorism refers to the deliberate introduction of an animal or plant disease for the purposes of generating fear, causing economic losses, or undermining social stability. The ultimate goal of agroterrorism is rooted in killing livestock and plants and contaminating food is to cause economic crises in the agricultural and food industries, social unrest, and loss of confidence in the government.Many experts believe that the United States’ agricultural sector and food supply are among the most vulnerable and least protected of all potential targets of attack, and they believe that terrorists have taken note of this. After American and allied forces overran some Al-Qaeda's refuges in caves in eastern Afghanistan in 2002, they found U.S. agricultural documents and Al-Qaeda training manuals on targeting agriculture among thousands of other documents.

Analysts have identified a number of characteristics of the United States’ agricultural system that make it very vulnerable to agroterrorism. Given that agriculture generally demands large expanses of land, farms are geographically dispersed in environments that are difficult to secure. Due to the fact that livestock are usually concentrated in confined locations, as a result it allows diseases to infect more animals quickly. Although many experts believe the United States is susceptible to agroterrorism, they have never suffered from a large scale agroterrorism related attack. Many political scientists have identified the 1984 salmonella attack in The Dalles, Oregon as a small-scale example of an agroterrorism attack in the United States. A religious cult intentionally contaminated ten restaurant salad bars with salmonella in an attempt to influence a local election, sickening more than 750 people. Even though the United States has not experienced a large-scale agroterrorism attack to date, similar to its anti-bioterrorism initiatives, the United States government has passed several pieces of legislation and started initiatives over the past few decades to better secure its agricultural system and prepare for potential attacks.

However, it is not to say that this form of terrorism has come to as hault, as during the COVID-19 Pandemic, social media users across the U.S. began an online challenge to lick the inside of cartons of ice cream before putting them back into their original locations within stores. Though it has not been proven one of the individuals doing so was spreading an infectious disease, there is an extreme risk. In addition, there have been reports in the year of 2023 from Giant Store, pertaining to prosecution of a former employee, as he is believed to have injected several food items with needles.

== Nuclear weapons ==
Concerns have also been raised regarding attacks involving nuclear weapons. It is considered plausible that terrorists could acquire a nuclear weapon. In 2011, the British news agency, the Telegraph, received leaked documents regarding the Guantanamo Bay interrogations of Khalid Sheikh Mohammed. The documents cited Khalid saying that, if Osama bin Laden is captured or killed by the Coalition of the Willing, an Al-Qaeda sleeper cell will detonate a "weapon of mass destruction" in a "secret location" in Europe, and promised it would be "a nuclear hellstorm".

While no terrorist group has ever successfully acquired and used a nuclear weapon, many political scientists and prominent government officials consider nuclear terrorism to be one of the single greatest threats in global security. There is strong evidence that terrorist groups like Al-Qaeda are actively seeking to acquire nuclear weapons, and the plutonium or highly enriched uranium (HEU) needed to produce them. Another serious concern is that weaknesses in many states’ nuclear security apparatuses have left them susceptible to theft or loss of HEU or plutonium. According to the International Atomic Energy Agency's (IAEA) Illicit Trafficking Database (ITDB), there have been 18 incidents of theft or loss of HEU and plutonium reported in ITDB's participating states. Given these serious concerns, the United States, its allies, and international organizations like the United Nations have established several international agreements and initiatives to ensure that all states’ nuclear security standards are adequate and effective, and to secure all vulnerable and unprotected nuclear stockpiles around the world over the next few years.

== Conventional firearms ==
Despite the popular image of terrorism as bombings alone, and the large number of casualties and higher media impact associated with bombings, conventional firearms are as much if not more pervasive in their use. For example, in the second part of the 2011 Norway attacks, 69 people were killed by Anders Behring Breivik, a man armed with two guns. The 2008 Mumbai terrorist attacks were done partly by guns and partly by bombs. Also, one Transportation Security Administration officer was killed and few others injured by a man with an assault rifle in the 2013 Los Angeles International Airport shooting.

In 2016, Omar Mateen killed 49 people with firearms during Orlando nightclub shooting.

In 2004, the European Council recognized the "need to ensure terrorist organisations and groups are starved of the components of their trade," including “the need to ensure greater security of firearms, explosives, bomb-making equipment and technologies that contribute to the perpetration of terrorist outrages."

== Stabbing ==
Stabbing attacks are inexpensive and easy to carry out, but very difficult for security services to prevent.

== Secondary attacks ==
Terrorist groups may arrange for secondary devices to detonate at a slightly later time in order to kill emergency-response personnel attempting to attend to the dead and wounded. Repeated or suspected use of secondary devices can also delay emergency response out of concern that such devices may exist. Examples include a (failed) device that was meant to release cyanide-gas during the February 26, 1993 World Trade Center bombing; and a second car bomb that detonated 20 minutes after the December 1, 2001 Ben Yehuda Street Bombing by Hamas in Jerusalem.

== Training ==
There are and have been training camps for terrorists. The range of training depends greatly on the level of support the terrorist organization receives from various organizations and states. In nearly every case the training incorporates the philosophy and agenda of the group's leadership as justification for the training as well as the potential acts of terrorism which may be committed. State sanctioned training is by far the most extensive and thorough, often employing professional soldiers and covert operatives of the supporting state.

== Cover ==
Where terrorism occurs in the context of open warfare or insurgency, its perpetrators may shelter behind a section of the local population. Examples include the intifada on Israeli-occupied territory, and insurgency in Iraq. This population, which may be ethnically distinct from the counter-terrorist forces, is either sympathetic to their cause, indifferent, or acts under duress.

== Funding ==
Funding can be raised in both legal and illegal ways. Some of the most common ways to raise funds are through front groups, charitable organizations, or NGOs with similar ideologies. In the absence of state funding, terrorists may rely on organized crime to fund their activities. This has included kidnapping, drug trafficking, or robbery.

Terrorist financing generated through the use of underground smuggling tunnels and the probability that a specific smuggling tunnel or terrorist criminal social network will use the smuggling tunnel to launch a kidnapping operation or terrorist attack has been addressed in the literature.

== Communications ==
Even though older communication methods like radio are still used, the revolution in communication technology over the past 10–15 years has dramatically changed how terrorist organizations communicate. E-mails, fax transmissions, websites, cell phones, and satellite telephones have made it possible for organizations to contemplate a global strategy. However, too great a reliance on this new technology leaves organizations vulnerable to sophisticated monitoring of communication and triangulation of its source. When Osama bin Laden found out that his satellite phone conversations were being intercepted, he ceased using this method to communicate.

== Fear ==
The primary weapon of terrorism is fear, destruction and killing are not an end in and of itself, but a tool to create fear and terror in the minds of the enemy. In an asymmetric situation an enemy who cannot be defeated militarily may be defeated psychologically, that they may come to fear attack and its consequences so much they may become willing to forgo a superior military position in order to be free of the cause of that fear.

If a terrorist group can carry out enough credible attacks then "coded warnings" or planted electronic chatter, designed to be intercepted, can cause as much disruption as a genuine attack or bomb. As long as the supposed attacks are plausible and they are supported by the occasional genuine attack, the authorities will be forced to expend resources to combat non-existent devices, dummy bombs and plain fictions, disrupting the lives of citizens, and feeding the public's fear.

== See also ==
- Incitement to terrorism
