= Index of war-related articles =

This is an alphabetical index of articles related to war. It serves as a navigational guide to topics covering the theory, history, conduct, organisation, technology, and consequences of warfare.

The index includes entries on types of war, forms of warfare, military strategies and doctrines, weapons and military systems, stages of conflict, and related political, legal, and social concepts. It is intended to assist readers in locating articles within the broader subject area and to provide an overview of the scope of war-related content.

== A ==
ablative armour - able seaman - absolute war - Abu Ghraib torture and prisoner abuse - acoustic mine - acquisition and cross-servicing agreement - Active Denial System - active duty - active protection system - adjutant - advance guard - administrative detention - admiral - admiralty court - aerial reconnaissance - aerial refuelling - aerial warfare - aerodrome - Aerospace Defence Center - after-action report - agent handling - aggression - agitprop - AirLand Battle - air assault - air base - airborne forces - air defence - air force - air interdiction - airstrike - air supremacy - aircraft carrier - airlift - airman - allied-occupied Austria - allied-occupied Germany - alliance - all-source intelligence - amphibious assault - amphibious warfare - ammunition - ammunition dump - American Indian Wars - amnesty - anarchist terrorism - anti-access/area denial - anti-aircraft warfare - anti-ballistic missile - anti-personnel mine - anti-submarine warfare - anti-tank warfare - anti-terrorism - appeasement - archery - Archimedes' heat ray - area bombardment - area denial - armistice - articles of War - armoured car - armoured bus - armoured fighting vehicle - armoured warfare - armour - army - army corps - army group - armed conflict - armed forces - armed neutrality - armed uprising - armoured personnel carrier - arms control - arms industry - arms race - arms trafficking - army aviation - arsenal - artillery - artillery battery - artillery observer - assassination of Archduke Franz Ferdinand - assassination - assassination market - assault rifle - asymmetric warfare - atomic bombings of Hiroshima and Nagasaki - atomic warfare - attack aircraft - attack dog - attack submarine - attrition warfare - auxiliary force - axis powers - axis of resistance - auxiliary cruiser - auxiliary ship - autonomous weapons - auxiliary police

== B ==
backblast area - ballistic missile - ballistic trajectory - bamboo curtain - barracks - barrage - barrage balloon - battle - battle axe - battle buddy - battle cry - battle damage assessment - battle drill - battle honour - battle rifle - battle tank - battlefield - battlefield medicine - battlefront - battleship - bayonet - beachhead - beheading - belligerent - bellum se ipsum alet - belt armour - Berlin blockade - Berlin Wall - berserker - besieged city - big stick ideology - billet - binary chemical weapon - biological hazard - biological warfare - black operation - black propaganda - black site - blackwater mercenaries - blast injury - The Blitz - blitzkrieg - blockade - blockade runner - blunderbuss - body armour - body count - bomb - bomb disposal - Bombardier (rank) - bombardier (aircrew) - bombardment - booby trap - boomerang attack - boot camp - boot knife - border conflict - border guard - bounty hunter - bounty system - bow and arrow - Boxer Rebellion - branch of service - bridgehead - brigade - brigade combat team - Brigade of Gurkhas - brigadier - brinkmanship - broadside - brown-water navy - buffer state - buffer zone - bugle call - bullet - bulletproof vest - bunker - bunker buster - burn pit - burning of Washington - burst transmission - Byzantine army - Byzantine–Arab wars - Byzantine–Ottoman wars

== C ==
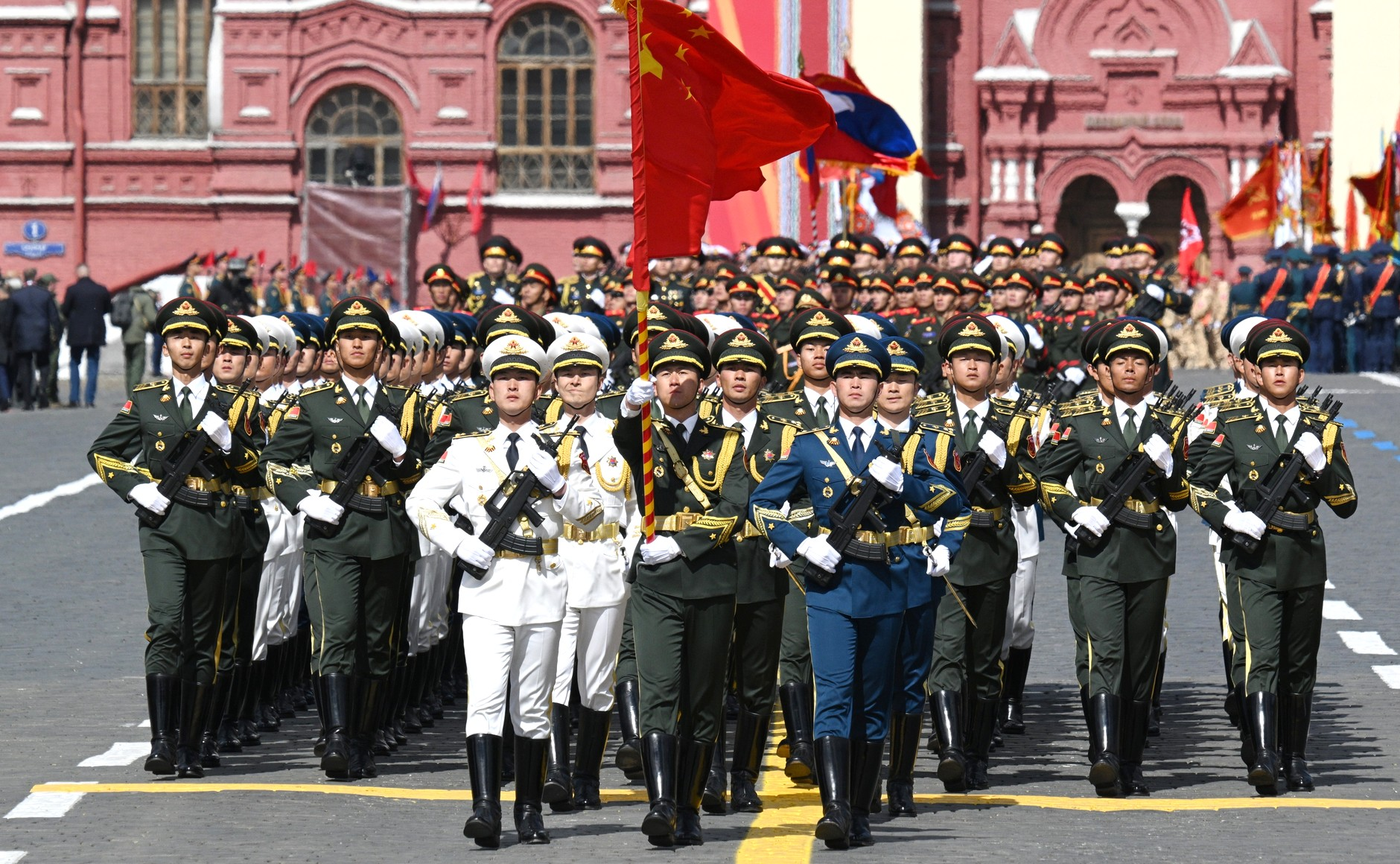
People's Liberation Army in Russia for the 2025 Moscow Victory Day Parade.

camouflage - camouflet - campaign - campaign hat - campaign history of the Roman military - campaign streamer - cannon - cannonade - cantonment - carpet bombing - carrier battle group - carrier strike group - casualty - casualty evacuation - casualty movement - cavalry - ceasefire - centurion tank - chain of command - chariot warfare - chemical warfare - cheval de frise - chief of defence - chief of staff - Chinese Army - choke point - cipher - civil defence - civil war - civilian casualty ratio - civilian control of the military - civilian internee - civilian internee - clandestine operation - claymore mine - close air support - close combat - coastal artillery - cold war - collateral damage - combat - combat engineer - combat fatigue - combat information center - combat medic - combat readiness - combat search and rescue - combat service support - combat stress reaction - combat support - combatant - combatant status review tribunal - combined arms - command and control - command hierarchy - command post - command responsibility - commander-in-chief - commando - commissar - communications intelligence - company (military unit) - compartmentalization (intelligence) - composite armour - compulsory military service - concentration camp - concertina wire - confidence-building measures - conflict escalation - conflict de-escalation - conflict resolution - conquest - conscientious objector - conscription - constitutional crisis - contact mine - containment - Continental Army - conventional warfare - convoy - cordon and search - corps - corpsman - counter-attack - counterbattery fire - counterforce - counter-insurgency - counterintelligence - counter-terrorism - countervalue - coup de main - coup d'état - court-martial - covering fire - covert action - covert operation - crater - crimes against humanity - crisis management - critical infrastructure protection - crossfire - cruise missile - cruise missile submarine - cryptography - cyberattack - cyberwarfare

== D ==
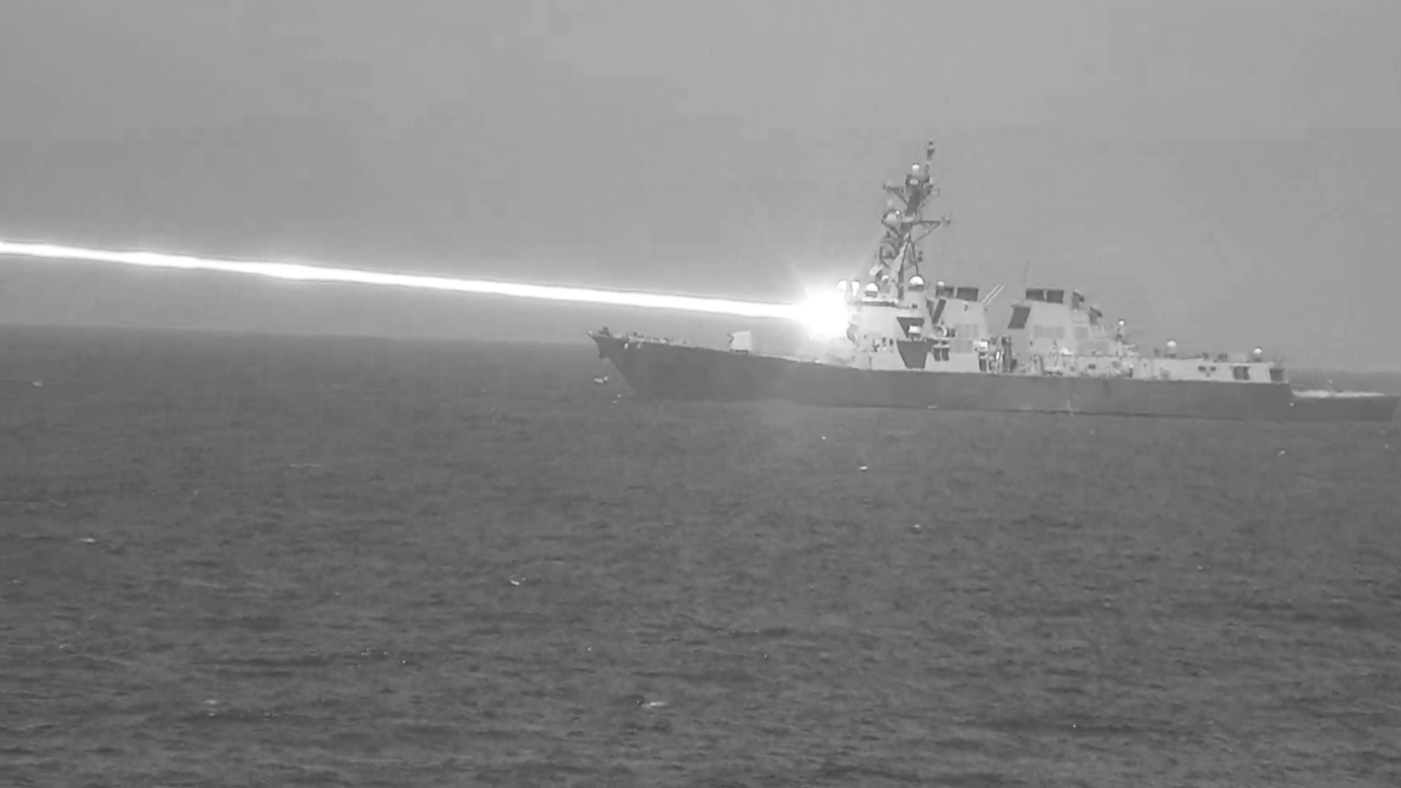
USS Preble Firing Helios, a directed-energy weapon.

damage control (maritime) - damage control surgery - decapitation strike - declaration of war - decoy - deep battle - deep operation - defence attaché - defence industry - defence intelligence - defence mechanism - defence minister - defensive alliance - defensive fighting position - defilade - delayed-action bomb - demilitarised zone - demobilisation - denial and deception - depleted uranium - depth charge - defence-in-depth (Roman military) - desertion - destroyer - deterrence theory - direct action - directed-energy weapon - dirty bomb - dirty war - disarmament - Disarmed Enemy Forces - disaster response - disinformation - disinformation campaign - dispersal (military) - dive bomber - diversionary attack - division (military) - doctrine - dog tag - dogfight - domestic terrorism - domino theory - double agent - double envelopment - downing street memo - dragon's teeth (fortification) - dragoon - dreadnought - drill instructor - drone warfare - drop zone - dry dock - dual loyalty - dumdum bullet - duress code - duty officer - dynamic defence

== E ==
early warning system - echelon formation - economic sanctions - economic warfare - effects-based operations - electromagnetic pulse - electronic attack - electronic countermeasure - electronic intelligence - electronic support measures - electronic warfare - elite forces - embargo - emergency evacuation - emergency government - emergency management - emergency powers - emplacement - encirclement - enemy combatant - enfilade and defilade - enigma machine - enlisted personnel - enlisted rank - entrenchment - envelopment - environmental security - escape and evasion - escort carrier - escort fighter - escort mission - espionage - esprit de corps - ethnic cleansing - ethnic conflict - Ethnic conflict - Eurofighter Typhoon - European defence initiative - exclusive economic zone - execution by firing squad - exit strategy - exoneration - expeditionary warfare - explosive ordnance disposal - explosive weapon - extraction (military) - extrajudicial killing - eyes only

== F ==
Fabian strategy - failed state - Fallschirmjäger - false flag - fast attack craft - fatigue duty - feigned retreat - field army - field artillery - field fortification - field gun - field marshal - field officer - field ration - fighter aircraft - fighting retreat - fighting vehicle - final protective fire - fire and movement - fire control system - fire discipline - fire support - firebase - firebombing - firepower - firing squad - first lieutenant - first strike (nuclear strategy) - flame tank - flamethrower - flank attack - fleet - fleet admiral - fleet air arm - fleet in being - flight commander - floating armoury - flying ace - fog of war - force concentration - force majeure - force multiplier - force protection - foreign internal defence - foreign intervention - foreign military sales - foreign volunteers - formation (military) - fortification - fortress - forward air control - forward air controller - forward observer - forward operating base - fourth-generation warfare - foxhole - foxhole radio - fragmentation (weaponry) - fragmentation grenade - fratricide - free company - free fire zone - freedom fighter - French Foreign Legion - frigate - front line - frontline - fuel air explosive - full metal jacket bullet - full spectrum dominance - fusilier

== G ==
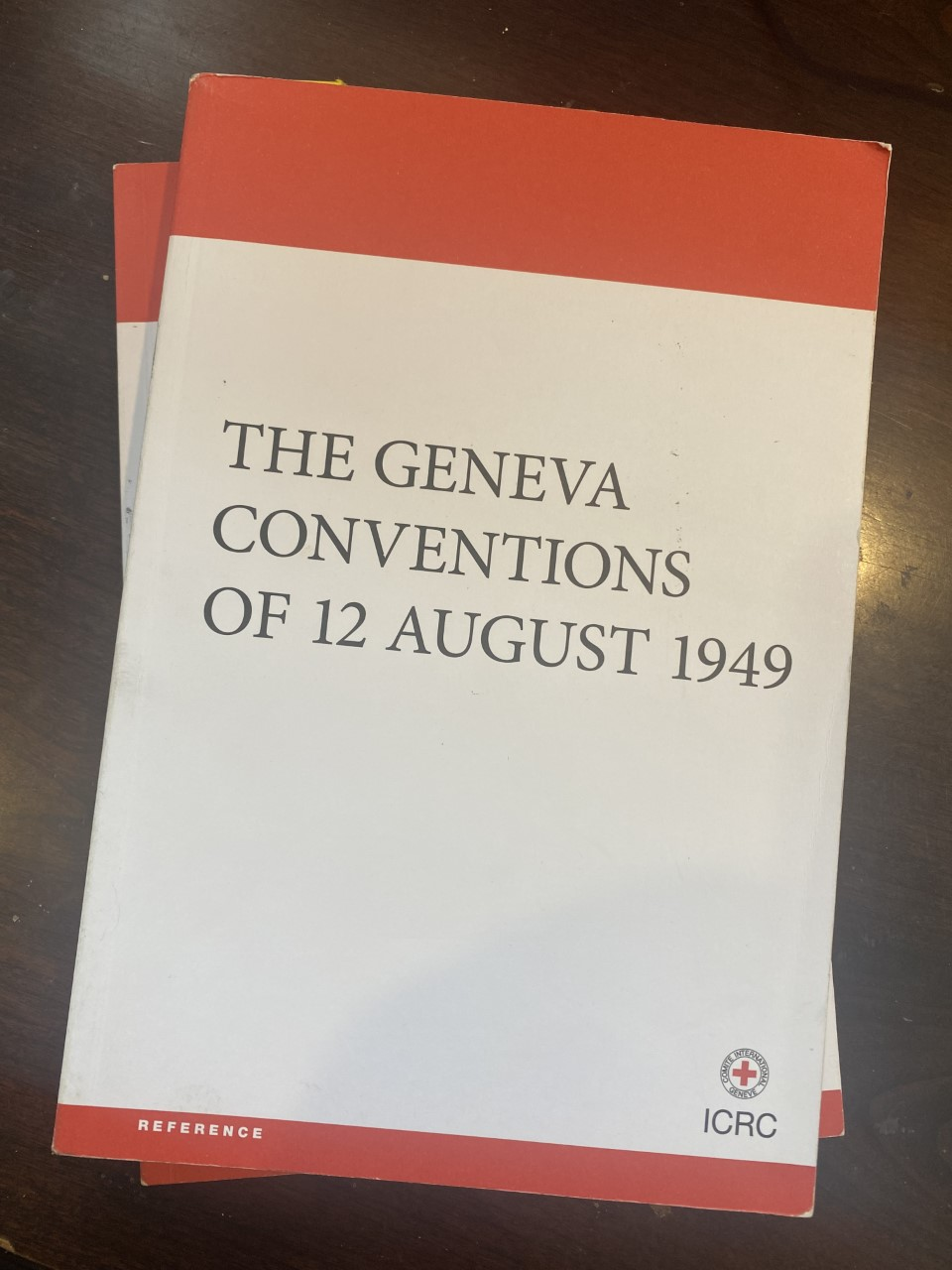
The Geneva Conventions of 12 August 1949.

garrison - gas mask - general officer - Geneva Conventions - Geneva Protocol - genocide - geographic combatant command - geopolitics - geospatial intelligence - German General Staff - German military rifles - ghost army - glide bomb - global conflict - global war on terror - government agency - government in exile - grand strategy - green-water navy - grenade - grey-zone conflict - grid reference - gross tonnage - ground attack aircraft - ground force - ground warfare - ground-controlled interception - Group army (military unit) - guard of honour - guard of honour - guarded command - guerrilla - guerrilla movement - guerrilla warfare - guided missile destroyer - guided-missile cruiser - gun carriage - gun emplacement - gun laying - gun politics - gun salute - gun turret - gunboat diplomacy - gunner (rank) - gunpowder warfare - gunship

== H ==
Hague Conventions of 1899 and 1907 - half-track - hand grenade - harbour master - hard power - hardened aircraft shelter - headquarters - headquarters and headquarters company - heavy bomber - heavy cruiser - heavy infantry - heavy machine gun - helicopter carrier - helicopter destroyer - hellenistic-era warships - helmet - helot revolt - high ground - high mobility artillery rocket system - high-value target - hijacking - hill fort - home guard - homeland defence - honour guard - horizontal escalation - horse artillery - hostage - hostage rescue - hulk (ship type) - hull classification symbol - human shield - humanitarian intervention - humanitarian law - hunter-killer group - hussar - hybrid warfare

== I ==
identification friend or foe - illegal combatant - imperialism - improvised explosive device - incapacitating agent - incendiary weapon - incident command system - indirect fire - indoctrination - industrial warfare - infantry - infantry fighting vehicle - infantry mobility vehicle - infiltration tactics - information operations - information warfare - infrared search and track - initial operational capability - inner German border - insurgency - insurgency - intelligence agency - intelligence analysis - intelligence assessment - intelligence cycle - intelligence officer - intercontinental ballistic missile - internal security - International Brigades - international criminal tribunal - International Freedom Battalion - international humanitarian law - International Legion of Territorial Defense of Ukraine - international security - international waters - internet censorship - internment - interrogation - inter-service rivalry - intervention force - interventionism - invasion - invasion stripe - iron curtain - iron dome - ironclad warship - irregular military - irregular soldier - irregular warfare - island hopping - isolationism - Italian military internees

== J ==
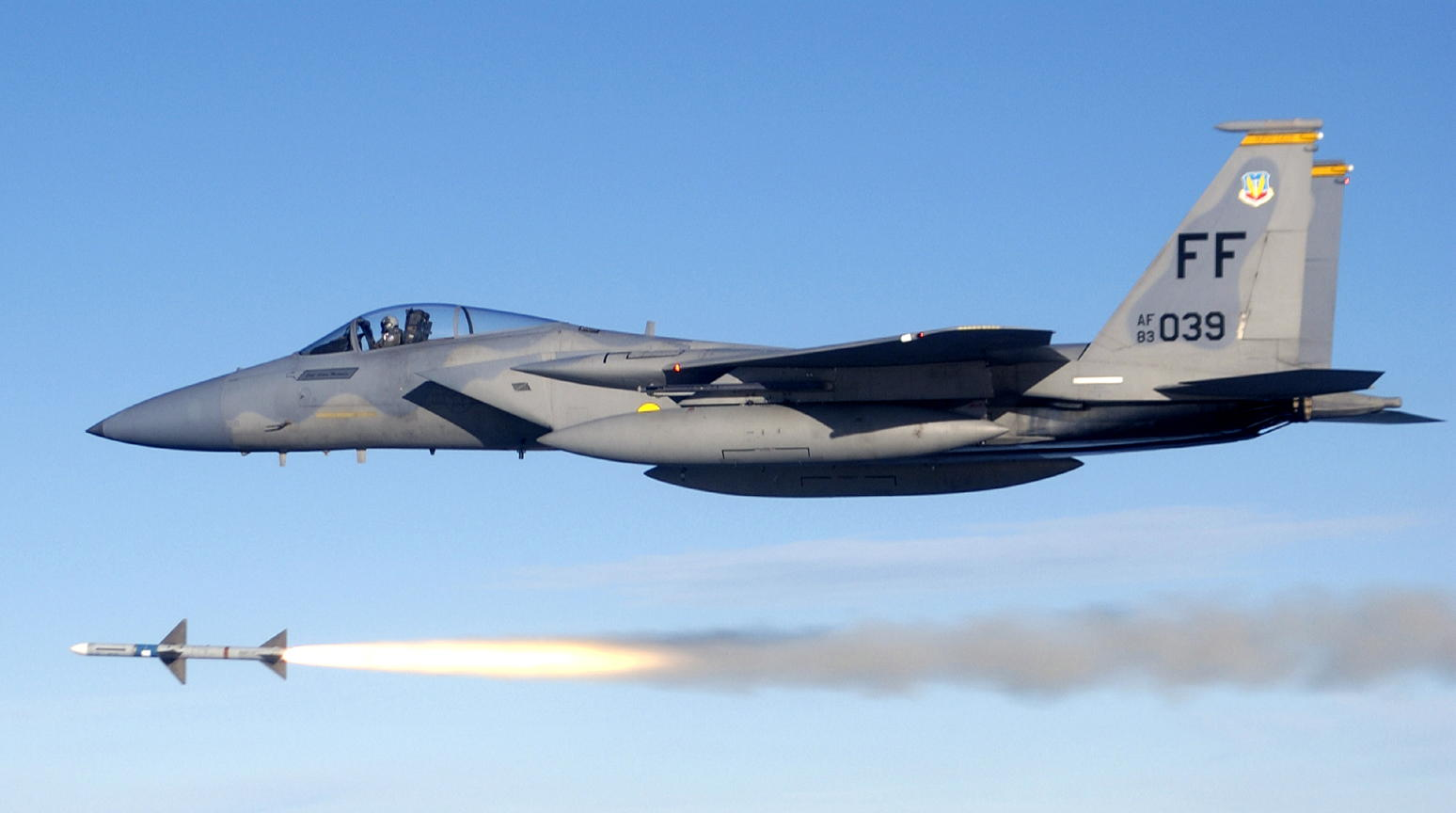
A USAF F-15C jet fighter firing a AIM-7 Sparrow 2

jackboot - Jäger (infantry) - Janissary - jeep - jet bomber - jet fighter - Jewish insurgency in Mandatory Palestine - jihad - jingoism - joint base - Joint Base Pearl Harbor–Hickam - Joint Chiefs of Staff - Joint Direct Attack Munition - Joint Expeditionary Force - Joint Intelligence Committee (India) - Joint Intelligence Committee (United Kingdom) - joint operations - Joint Special Operations Command - Joint Staff - joint task force - Joint Warfare Centre - judge advocate general - juggernaut - jump jet - jungle warfare - junior officer - junta - jury- jus ad bellum - jus in bello - just war theory

== K ==
Kaiserliche Marine - kamikaze - katyusha rocket launcher - KFOR - kill box - kill chain - kill zone - kinetic bombardment - kinetic energy penetrator - kinetic warfare - King's German Legion - kitchen police - knife fight - knight banneret - Knight's Cross of the Iron Cross - Korean demilitarized zone - Kosovo Force - K-ration - Kriegsmarine - Kriegslokomotive - Kurdish–Turkish conflict

== L ==
land mine - land warfare - landing craft - landing operation - landing zone - laser designation - laser weapon - laser-guided bomb - lawful combatant - laws of war - lead ship - leatherneck - lend-lease - letter of marque - levée en masse - liaison officer - light bomber - light cavalry - light cruiser - light infantry - limited war - line formation - line infantry - line of battle - line of control - line of departure - line of sight - list of military tactics - live-fire exercise - logistics - logistics officer - loitering munition - London Naval Treaty - lone wolf attack - long-range penetration - long-range reconnaissance patrol - looting - low flying military training - low-intensity conflict - low-level flight

== M ==
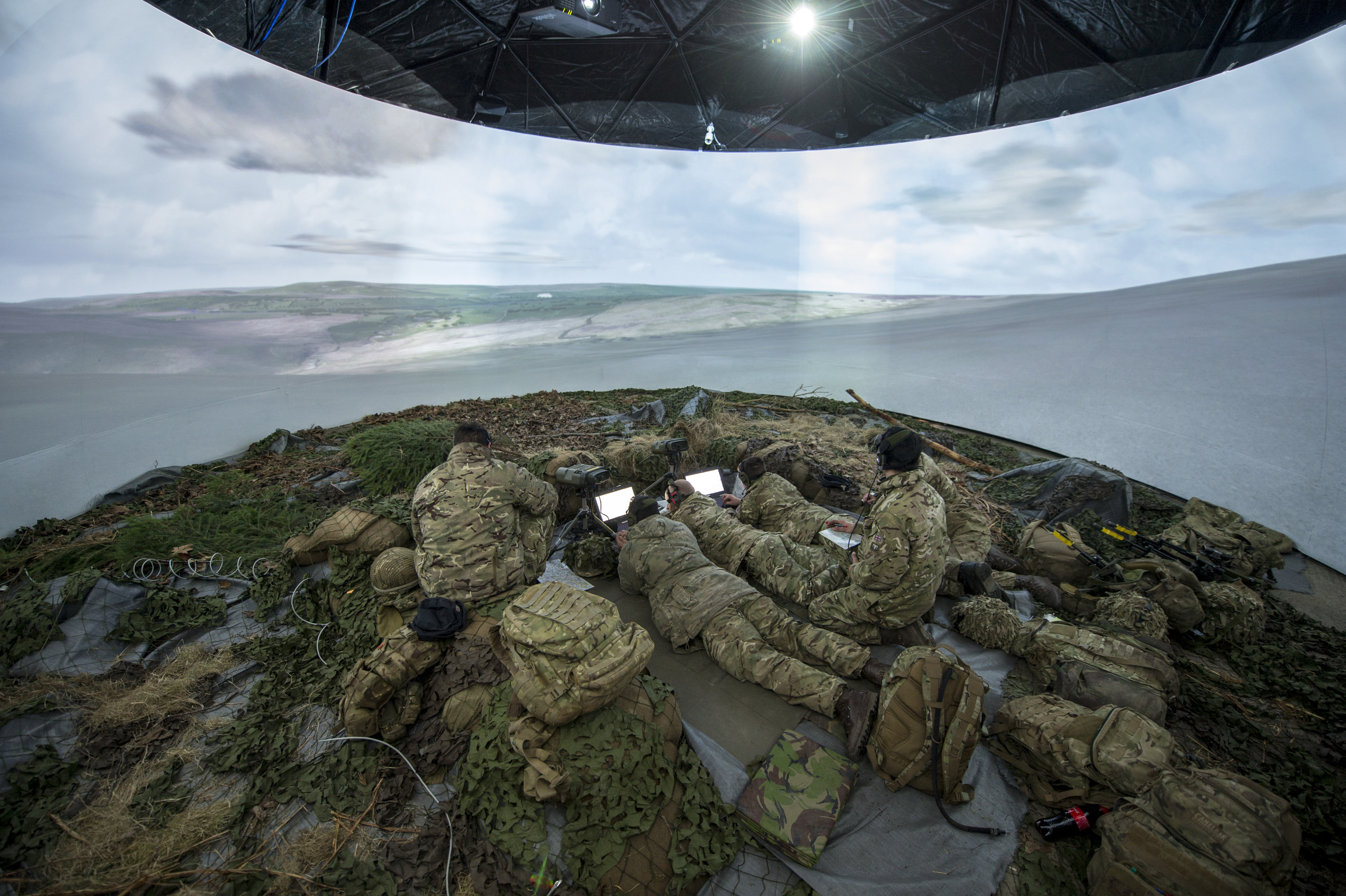
Soldiers from the Royal Artillery inside the FST Simulation tent, which uses 360 degree technology to assist in military simulation training.

machine gun - magazine (firearms) - Mahal (Israel) - main battle tank - manoeuvre warfare - marine corps - marine infantry - maritime patrol aircraft - maritime security - marksman - martial law - mass killing - master gunner - materiel - mechanised infantry - mechanised warfare - medical evacuation - medieval warfare - mercenary - merchant raider - military - military academy - military administration - military adviser - military aid - military alliance - military attaché - military aviation - military base - military budget - military camouflage - military campaign - military censorship - Military Chaplain - military chaplain - military command - military commissariat - military communication - military coup - military deception - military dictatorship - military district - military doctrine - military engineering - military exercise - military government - military history - military industrial complex - military intelligence - military intervention - military junta - military logistics - military medicine - military necessity - military occupation - military offensive - military operation - military organisation - military parade - military police - military recruitment - military reserve force - military satellite - military science - military simulation - military sociology - military strategy - military supply chain management - military tactics - military technology - military theorist - military transport - military transport aircraft - military tribunal - military unit - militia - minelayer - mine-resistant ambush protected vehicle - ministry of defence - Ministry of War - misinformation - missile - missile boat - missile defence - mobilisation - mock combat - mock execution - modern warfare - morale - mortar (weapon) - mountain warfare - mounted infantry - Muhamalai Forward Defence Line - multi-domain operations - multinational force - municipal militia - mutiny

== N ==
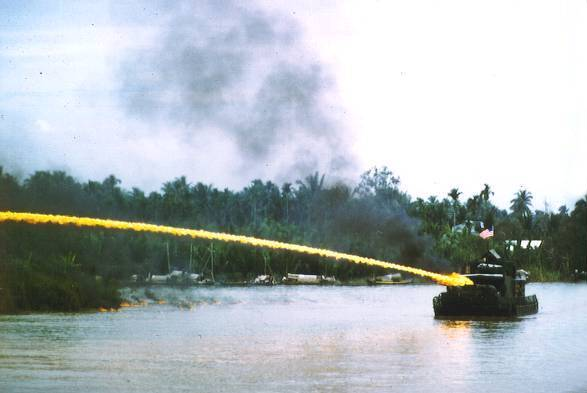
US riverboat using napalm in Vietnam

napalm - national defence - national emergency - national guard - national security - national security council - national security state - national service - nation-building - native police - natural barrier - naval air station - naval arms race - naval artillery - naval aviation - naval base - naval blockade - naval bombardment - naval fleet - naval gunfire support - naval infantry - naval intelligence - naval militia - naval mine - naval shipyard - naval warfare - navy - neocolonialism - neo-medievalism - nerve agent - network-centric warfare - neutral country - neutrality (international relations) - night attack - no man's land - no-fly zone - non-combatant - non-interventionism - non-lethal weapon - non-state actor - nonviolent resistance - North Atlantic Treaty Organization - nuclear blackmail - nuclear command and control - nuclear deterrence - nuclear fallout - nuclear holocaust - nuclear proliferation - nuclear strategy - nuclear submarine - nuclear triad - nuclear umbrella - nuclear warfare - nuisance raid

== O ==
oath of enlistment - objective (military) - oblique order - oboe (navigation) - observation post - occupation of Japan - occupied territory - ocean escort - offensive (military) - offensive counter-air - offensive realism - officer (armed forces) - officer cadet - officer candidate school - officer corps - officer training - oil campaign - Operation Barbarossa - Operation Z (1944) - operational art - operational control - operational level of war - operational manoeuvre group - operational mobility - operational plan - operational reserve - operational security - operations other than war - operations research - operations room - opfor - opposing force - oppression - optical sight - order of battle - ordnance - ordnance disposal - Ordnance QF 25-pounder - Outer Space Treaty - outpost - overmatch - overpressure - overwatch

== P ==
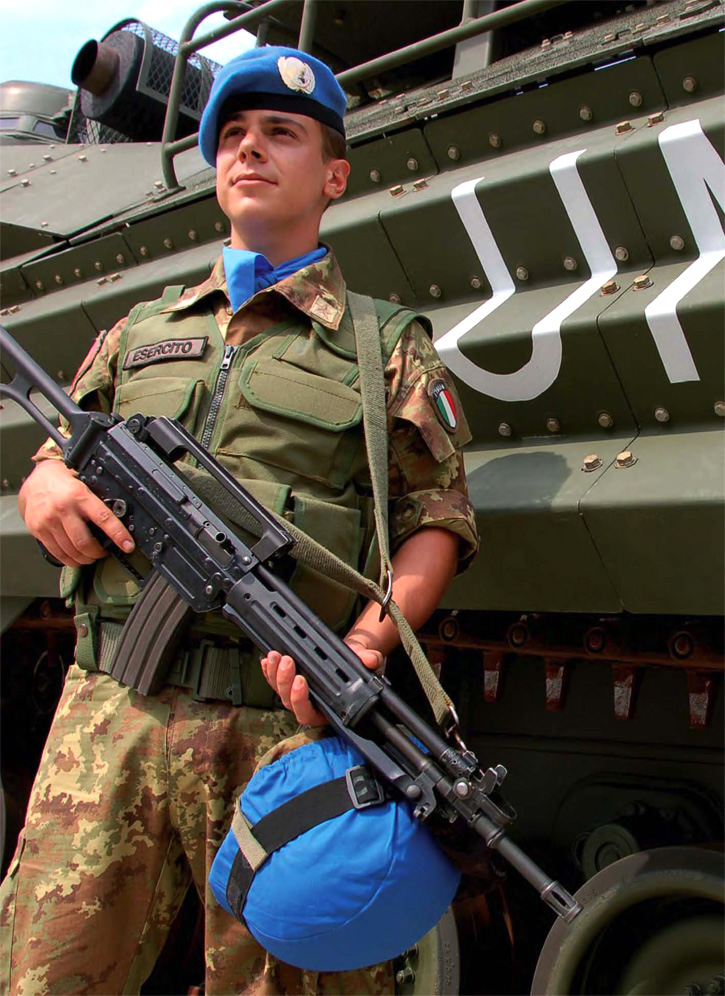
A soldier from the Italian Army stands guard during the UNIFIL peacekeeping mission in Lebanon

paramilitary - paramilitary organisation - paratrooper - partisan (military) - patrol - patrol boat - peace enforcement - peace movement - peace through strength - peace treaty - peacebuilding - peacekeeping - peacetime - people’s war - periscope - permanent war economy - permissive action link - personal defence weapon - personnel recovery - phalanx - picket line - pillbox - pitched battle - platoon - pocket battleship - point defence - police action - Polish Legions (Napoleonic period) - political warfare - pontoon bridge - Portuguese Legion (Napoleonic Wars) - post-traumatic stress disorder - post-war consensus - precision bombing - precision-guided munition - pre-emptive nuclear strike - pre-emptive war - press gang - preventive diplomacy - preventive war - prisoner of war - private military company - privateer - propaganda - propaganda of the deed - proportionality (law) - protected cruiser - provost marshal - proxy fight - proxy war - psychological warfare - public affairs officer - public diplomacy - public security - pulse detonation engine - punitive expedition - purge - pyrrhic victory -

== Q ==
Q-ship - Qassam rocket - quagmire theory - quantum radar - quarterdeck - quartermaster general - quartermaster - quasi-alliance - quasi-war - Quebec Agreement - quick-firing gun

== R ==
raid - railgun - rangefinder - rapid deployment force - rapid dominance - rationing - rear admiral - rear guard - reconnaissance - reconnaissance aircraft - reconnaissance in force - reconnaissance satellite - redoubt - refugee crisis - regimental system - regular army - reinforcement - render safe procedure - reserve forces - resistance movement - resource war - retreat (military) - Rhodesian Light Infantry - rifle - rifle grenade - rifleman - right of conquest - riot control - riot police - riposte - riverine warfare - roadblock - rocket artillery - rocket launcher - rocket propelled grenade - ROD 2-8-0 - Roman legion - Royal Dutch East Indies Army - Royal Sicilian Regiment - Rule of Law in Armed Conflicts Project - rules of engagement - rules of war - rules-based international order - rump state - ruse de guerre - Russian–German Legion

== S ==
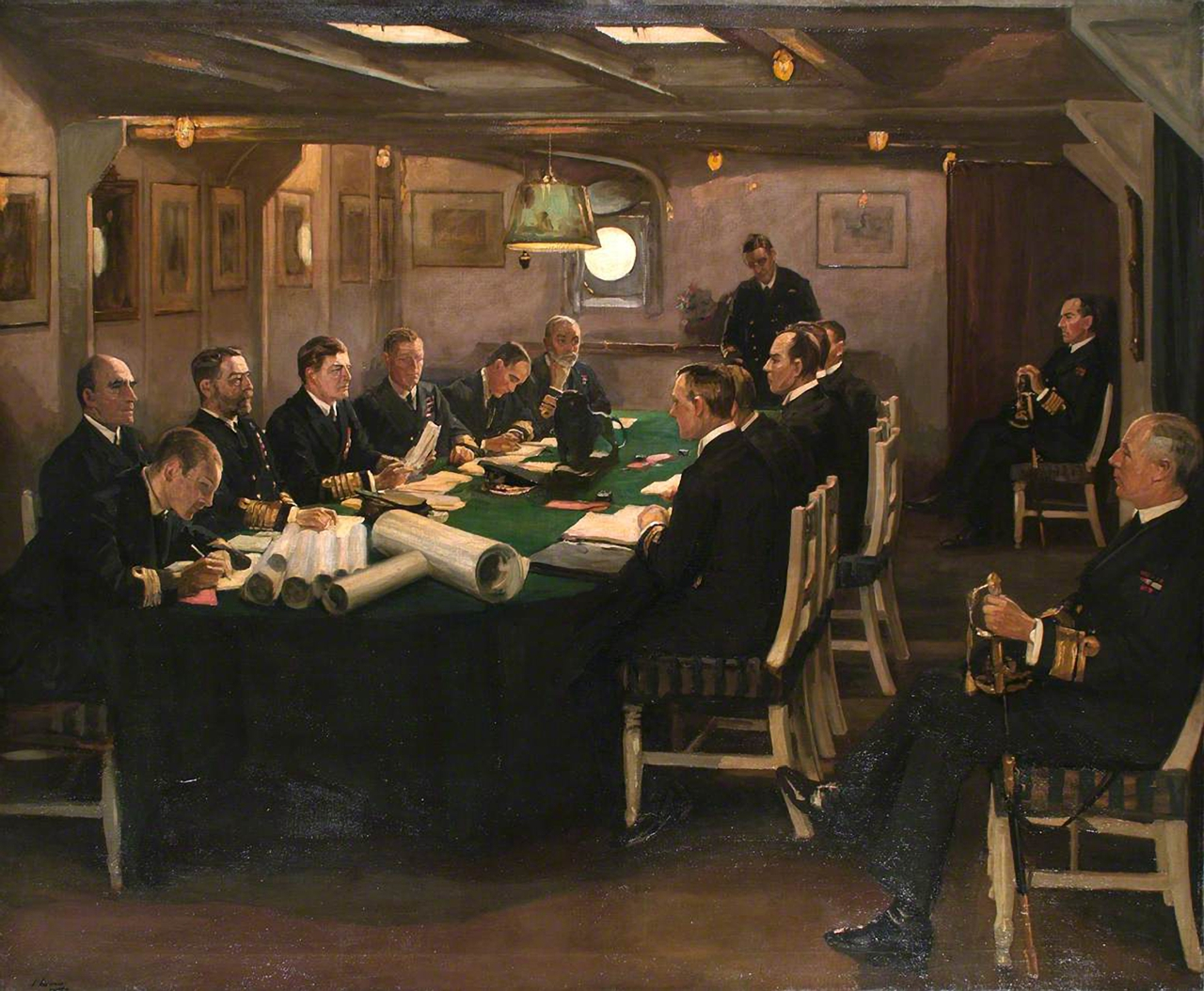
The End- The Fore-Cabin of HMS 'Queen Elizabeth' with Admiral Beatty Reading the Terms of the Surrender of the German Navy, Rosyth, 16 November 1918

sabotage - saboteur - sailing frigate - samurai - sanctions - saturation bombing - scout (military) - scouting - sea denial - sealift - search and destroy - search and rescue - second lieutenant - second strike - Second World War - secret police - security clearance - security council - security dilemma - security force assistance - siege - siege engine - siege warfare - signal corps - signal intelligence - Silent Service - situation room - skirmishers - sniper - sniper rifle - soft power - soldier - sortie - Spanish Legion - space weapons - special forces - Special forces - special operations - special reconnaissance - Special Relationship - sphere of influence - spike missile - spy - standing army - state of emergency - state of siege - state of war - strategic bombing - strategic defence - strategic depth - strategic deterrence - strategic reserve - strategic studies - strike aircraft - submachine gun - submarine base - submarine tender - submarine warfare - subversion - suicide attack - supply depot - suppression fire - suppression of enemy air defences - surface warfare - surface-to-air missile - surrender (military) - surveillance - surveillance drone - survival kit

== T ==
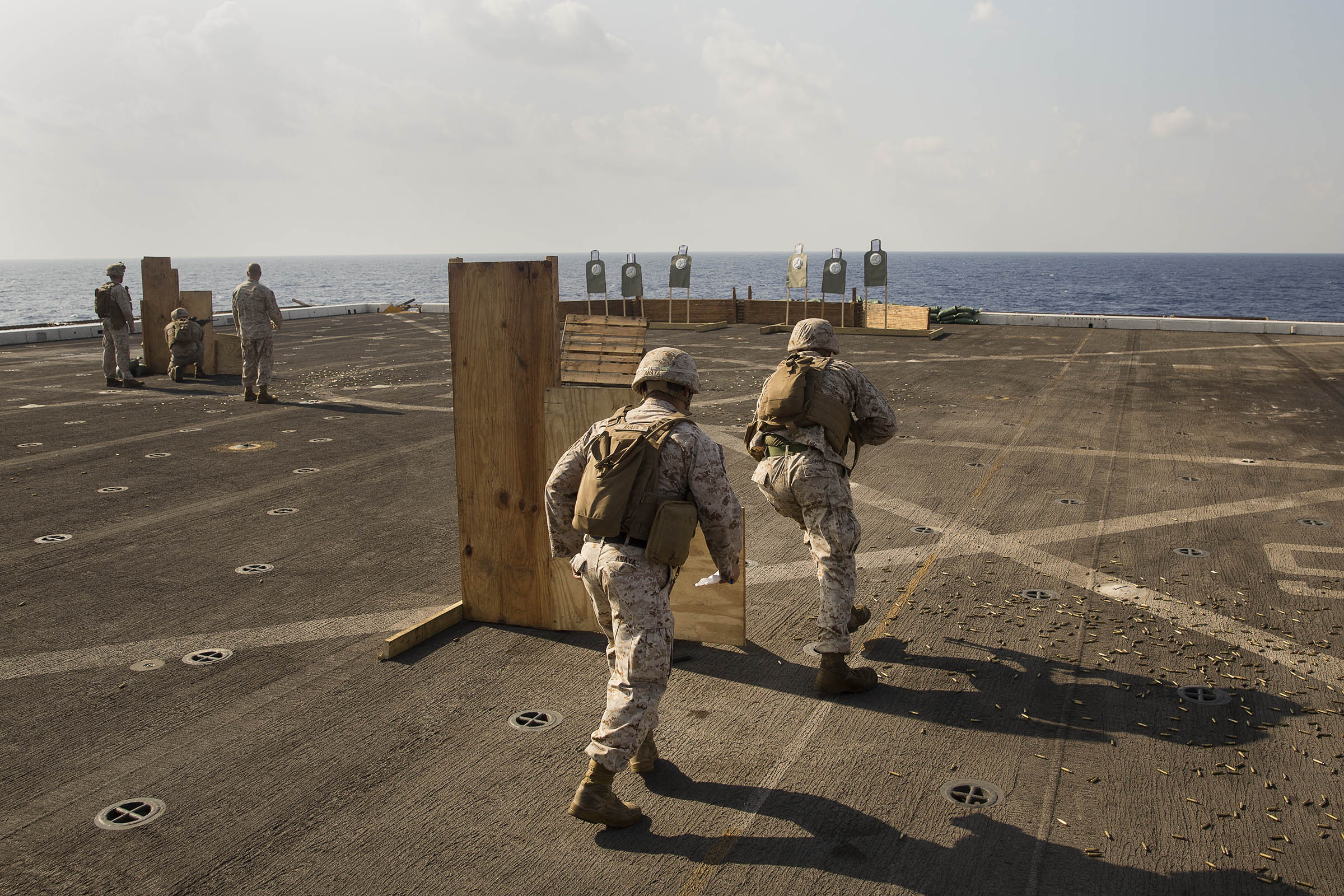
US Marines maneuver to a new position to engage a target during a live-fire training exerise

tactical ballistic missile - tactical bombing - tactical communications - tactical intelligence - tactical nuclear weapon - tactical reconnaissance - tactical retreat - tactics - tank - tank destroyer - tank warfare - target acquisition - target drone - targeting (warfare) - targeting pod - task force - task group - technical intelligence - terrain analysis - terror bombing - terrorism - theatre command - theatre of war - thermite grenade - thermobaric weapon - thermonuclear weapon - third generation warfare - time on target - total war - training camp - training exercise - transport aircraft - transport helicopter - trench warfare - trigger discipline troop - troop surge - truce

== U ==
u-boat - u-boat campaign - uh-60 black hawk - unarmed combat - unconditional surrender - unconventional warfare - underground warfare - underwater warfare - unexploded ordnance - unified combatant command - unilateral disarmament - unipolar world - unit cohesion - unit of action - united states department of defense - United States Military Code of Conduct - united states navy - unmanned aerial vehicle - unmanned combat aerial vehicle - unmanned ground vehicle - unmanned surface vehicle - urban combat - urban warfare - USATC S160 Class - use of force - utility helicopter

== V ==
v-1 flying bomb - v-2 rocket - v-weapons - Värvat främlingsregemente - vacuum bomb - vanguard - vehicle armour - vehicle recovery - veteran - vertical envelopment - victory - victory parade - violence - violent non-state actor - virtual warfare - vehicle-borne improvised explosive device - vertical takeoff and landing aircraft - violent extremism - Volkswagen Kübelwagen

== W ==
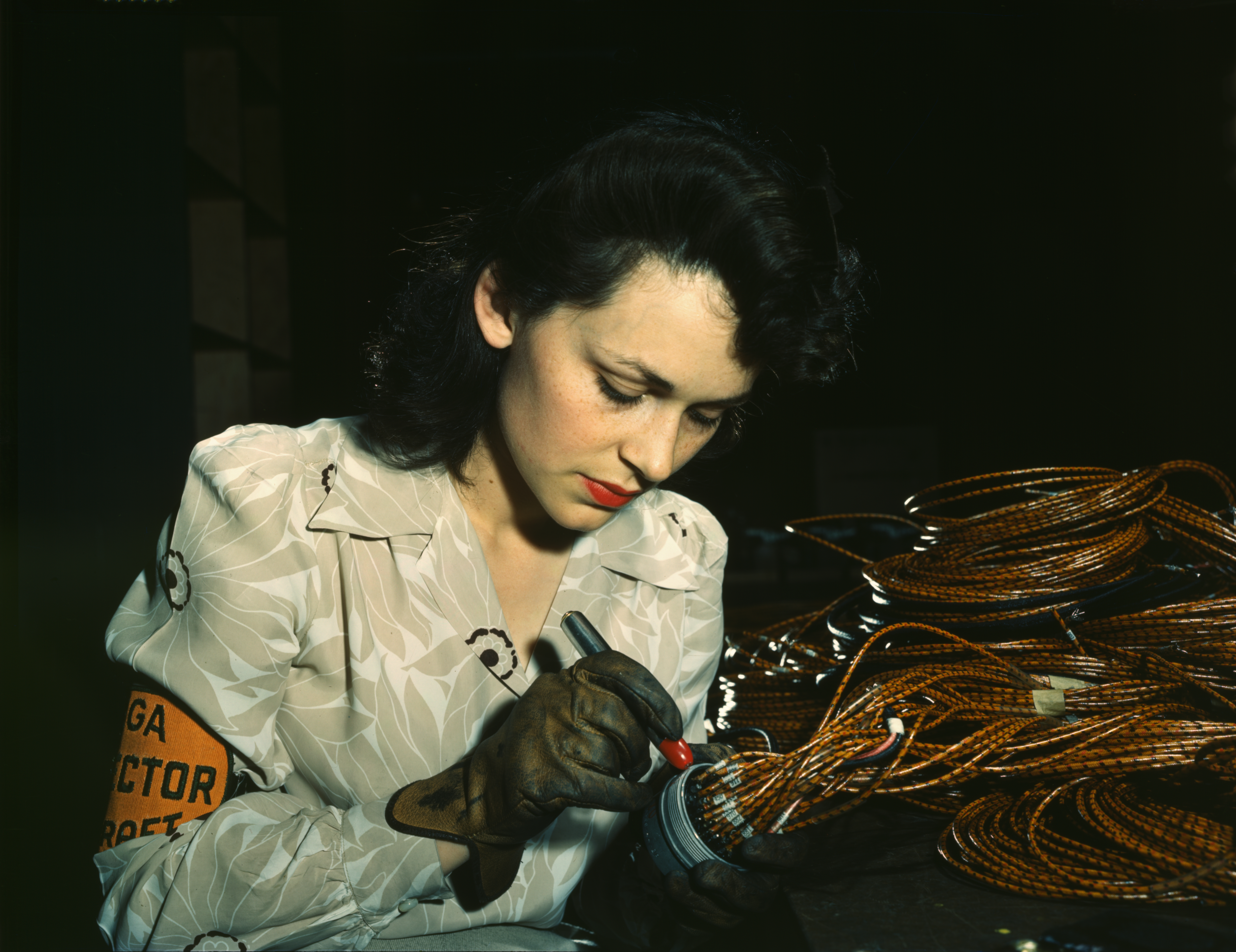
World War II woman aircraft worker, Vega Aircraft Corporation, Burbank, California 1942

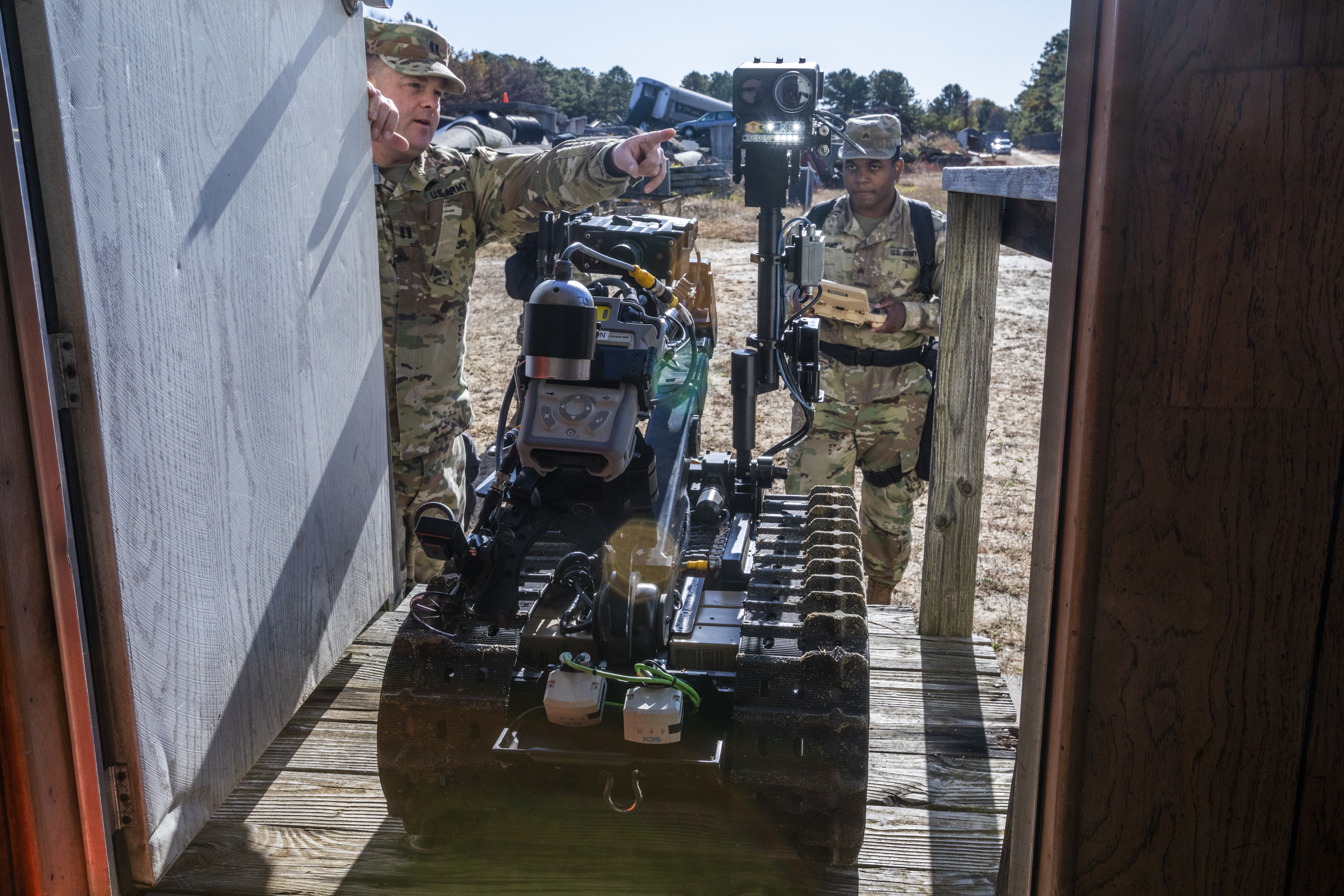
New Jersey National Guard 21st Weapons of Mass Destruction Civil Support Team

war - war among the people - war and environmental law - war artist - war as metaphor - war bond - war bonnet - war bride - war cabinet - war canoe - war chest - war children - war college - war comics - war commissar - war communism - war correspondent - war council - war crime - war crimes trials - war dance - War Department - war dialing - war diary - war discography - war dove - war economy - war effort - war elephant - war emergency power - war film - war finance - war flag - war footing - war game - war grave - war hammer - war hawk - war horse - war industry - war language - warlord - war memorial - war memorial locomotive - war museum - war novel - war of attrition - war of independence - war of manoeuvre - war of religion - war of succession - war on terror - war photography - war pig - war pigeon - war poet - war poetry - war powers - war profiteering - war propaganda - war rape - war referendum - war reparations - war reserve stock - war resister - war risk insurance - war room - war rugs - war sand - war scythe - war ship - war song - war studies - war tax - war tax stamp - war termination - war theatre - war tourism - war trauma - war tribunal - war trophy - war wagon - war weariness - warfare - warhead - warlord - warlordism - warrant officer - warship - wartime sexual violence - watchtower - waterboarding - WD Austerity 2-8-0 - WD Austerity 2-10-0 - weapons of mass destruction - weapons platform - weapons system - weather warfare - Westphalian sovereignty - wet navy - white army - white flag - white phosphorus weapon - white propaganda - whole-of-government approach - wing commander - winged hussar - Winter War - winter warfare - wire-guided missile - withdrawal (military) - wolfpack (naval tactic) - women in warfare - World War I - World War II - world war - worldwide military command and control system

== X ==
x-band radar - xiphos - x-ray laser

== Y ==
Yamato-class battleship - Yemen Civil War (2014–present) - Yeomanry - yellow rain - Yom Kippur War - YPG International - Ypres Salient - Yugoslav People's Army - Yugoslav Wars

== Z ==
Zanzibar Revolution - Zeebrugge Raid - zero hour (military) - Zimmerit - zone of control - Zyklon B
