= Complex system approach to peace and armed conflict =

In the complex system approach to peace and armed conflict, the social systems of armed conflict are viewed as complex dynamical systems. The study of positive and negative feedback processes, attractors and system dimensionality, phase transitions and emergence is seen as providing improved understanding of the conflicts and of the effectiveness or ineffectiveness of interventions aiming to resolve the conflicts.

== Model motivation ==
Arguments for modelling the social systems in which peace and armed conflict take places as complex dynamical systems are that they contain many interacting agents whose causal chains of effects within a wider social ecosystem may lead to surprising large-scale changes, but can also show long-term stability despite many small-scale changes. Intractable long-term conflict is seen as a clear example of the relevance of the complex systems model. The Israeli–Palestinian conflict and peace process are seen by Peter T. Coleman as illustrating "a basic paradox of intractable conflicts: they are essentially stable despite tremendous volatility and change." Coleman and colleagues argue that the complex system model of armed conflict may explain the paradoxical effect that armed conflict can lead to results in terms of resources, security and well-being that oppose the interests of all sides in the conflict. They characterise an intractable conflict as being "entrenched in a wide variety of cognitive, affective and social-structural mechanisms [that] effectively [decouple it]" from the original motivations that started the conflict.

== Terminology: positive, negative ==
In complex systems models of peace and conflict, the adjectives "positive" and "negative" are used in two different senses: feedback loops versus the social goal of a state of peace. First, they are used in the sense of positive (amplifying) and negative (damping) feedback loops in the system. Second, they are used in the sense where "positive" refers to attractors or positive-feedback loops tending to stabilise or reduce conflict to attain the socially desirable ("benign") goal of peace; and "negative" refers to ("malignant") attractors or positive-feedback loops tending to stabilise or amplify conflict.

== Complex systems properties ==
=== Positive and negative feedback ===
Negative (damping) and positive (amplifying) feedback processes as complex systems features play roles in both stability and rapid change. Negative feedbacks that promote stability in a peace and conflict context can include legal and moral "lines [not to be] crossed" and social sanctions. Positive feedbacks that can escalate the system to "catastrophic change" can include acts of violence or other "morally reprehensible acts". Positive feedbacks that can de-escalate the system away from an existing stable conflict towards peace can include actions such as unilateral disarmament or Anwar Sadat's visit to Jerusalem.

Armed conflict involves multiple levels ranging from intra-personal to inter-group interactions. Change that promotes a positive feedback loop towards peace within a single psychological or sociological level may be compensated by a negative interlevel feedback loop, restoring the state of conflict.

Joseph Ruane and Jennifer Todd argue that the social and psychological negative feedback processes for intra-community solidarity and ethnic identity and inter-community conflict tend to maintain conflict situations despite a changing environment such as socio-economic development. They recommend "look[ing] for critical phenomena, points of control" in which key negative feedback processes can be modified for finding ways to solve ethnic conflicts.

Jason Healey and Robert Jervis argue that during the Cold War, building more weapons could in some cases constitute negative feedback, leading the other side to build fewer weapons, with the effect of maintaining a stable state, while in other cases could constitute positive feedback, contributing to the Cold War arms race. The lack of sufficient data led to academic debate about which sign of feedback was correct.

=== Attractors and system dimensionality ===
Coleman argues that there exist attractor states in conflict systems in which the thoughts, feelings and actions of each party tend to evolve towards an attractor, while continuing to change. He argues that conflict attractors are more likely to exist when the number of significant parameters in the system is reduced, such as with stereotypes of the opposing social group versus rich, nuanced views of one's own social group. An example of dimensional reduction is that after Mozambique became independent from Portugal in 1975, the party gaining power, FRELIMO, discouraged "anti-revolutionary" and "anti-patriotic" opinion, leading to political polarization along a single dimension of supporting or opposing FRELIMO.

Latent attractors are attractors in a dynamical system that do not show obvious signs of conflict. Latent attractors promoting conflict include dehumanization and stereotyping. Conflict resolution processes that show no obvious signs of effectiveness may be latent attractors that modify the system's properties and later lead to rapid de-escalation of the conflict.

=== Phase transitions ===
An example of a phase transition in peace and armed conflict, when the system is viewed as a dynamical system, is the shift from a latent phase of conflict, in which the conflict is not violent, to one that becomes violent.

=== Emergence, self-organization and downward causation ===
The complex systems approach to peace and armed conflict includes the existence of emergence and self-organization, as well as downward causation in which the small-scale, apparently unconstrained processes are together constrained by the large-scale behaviour of the system.

== Implications for conflict resolution ==
Within the attractor model, a solution to a conflict requires either "disassembling the malignant attractor or moving the system into the basin [of attraction] of a different, more benign attractor". When interventions aimed to promote peace are not based on accurate dynamical models of the sustainable states, the interventions are unlikely to move the system towards long-term peace.

Coleman and colleagues recommend studying the positive and negative feedback loops in an armed conflict situation, and studying the connectivity of the system as a network. They suggest that appropriately adding more links in the network can constitute a change in the dynamical properties of the system.

The time scales for latent attractors to evolve into visible attractors can be long, with the period from first contact to peace accords in the Mozambique case being 15 years. Interventions that may change the system's state include latent attractors; weak power (mediators with no power); negotiation chains; interventions that "carefully" increase the dimensionality of the system; strengthen peace attractors in parts of the dynamical space that are isolated from the core strong conflict attractor, such as using confidence-building measures that create basins of attraction despite appearing to have little effect on the conflict.

The complex systems view on peace processes implies that even if a conflict appears to be de-escalating, the attractors for conflict may remain in place. Several interventions may bypass the attractors, making the de-escalation more likely to continue in the long-term. Decoupling pro-conflict positive feedback loops, such as "showing positive examples of specific out-group members" or giving attention to "important (e.g. high status, charismatic) in-group member[s]" who disagree with the in-group's view of the conflict, are examples of increasing the dimensionality of the dynamical system. Negative feedback loops can be introduced, for example to keep military activities stable by creating military monitoring institutions. The institutionalisation of "nuanced, alternative conflict narratives" in the media, the education system and official statements may reduce the chance of returning to a low-dimensional system.

== Methods ==
The complex systems approach to modelling peace and conflict involves studying interactions and processes, rather than just components and agents.

The complex systems approach also requires interventions in a conflict being themselves viewed as processes that perturb the complex system, with the possibility of unexpected consequences.

Agent-based social simulations to model armed conflict intractability and the possibilities of solving the conflicts were developed in the 2000s. Their scientific validity was contested by James N. Rosenau.

== Cyberwarfare ==
Healey and Jervis argued in 2020 that cyberwarfare during peacetime mostly acted as a negative feedback in relation to armed conflict, but could become a positive feedback in later conflicts. In the 2010s, cyberattacks including the Stuxnet attacks on Iranian nuclear facilities and the 2014 Sony Pictures hack took place and several states created cybercommands such as the United States Cyber Command with 6200 employees in 2018. Healey and Jarvis argue that acute geopolitical crises risk cyberconflict acting as a positive feedback on armed conflict. They suggest that as of 2018, cyberconflict had not reached a tipping point, but could do so later.

Healey and Jervis recommend implementing negative feedbacks to increase stability such as extended equivalents of the Moscow–Washington hotline to encourage communication, stating that the hotlines should "be lavishly funded ... as a powerful negative feedback hedge to a more aggressive persistent engagement".

== Case studies ==
=== Mozambique ===
The Mozambican Civil War was used by Coleman and colleagues as an example illustrating the relevance of the complex systems model. They argue that "power structures, meaning systems and relational dynamics" constituted a low-dimensional dynamical system with a strong attractor state of intractable conflict. In their view, the intervention of the Community of Sant'Egidio in negotiating direct talks modified the system's properties, leading to the Rome General Peace Accords. The complex system model explains why Sant'Egidio played a crucial role despite having no military, legal or political power.

=== South Sudan ===
Adam Day argues that attempted state-building in South Sudan by the United Nations Mission in South Sudan (UNMISS) following independence in 2011 was ineffective due to a positive feedback loop in which United Nations budgetary support for formal administrative structures was diverted into reinforcing Sudan People's Liberation Army (SPLA) control of ethno-military networks of unofficial governance. Prior to independence, positive feedback loops of SPLA administration of land, cattle markets and oil revenue supporting their own ethnic group led to local government being "an empty shell". UNMISS and other international funding starting in 2011 was managed by the South Sudanese government making statements and "tick[ing] the boxes" to satisfy the donors, while the money itself reinforced the pre-existing dynamical system without modifying it. Day argues that describing this as corruption is correct but fails to explain the funds' role in the dynamical system, which evolved "to new inputs". Administrative actions aimed at decentralisation of resources outside of major urban areas effectively contributed to raising SPLA commanders' salaries. The aim of shifting security resources from the SPLA to civilian police had the result of growing the size of the SPLA.

== See also ==
- cliodynamics
