= Nuclear escalation =

Concept of conventional warfare escalating to nuclear warfare

Nuclear escalation is the concept in military theory that describes the process by which a conventional conflict changes into a nuclear war due to the use of nuclear weaponry by one or both sides of the participant states. It represents a significant and potentially catastrophic increase in the intensity and destructiveness of war between nuclear states.

The risk of nuclear escalation was a major concern during the Cold War, particularly for the North Atlantic Treaty Organization (NATO) and the Warsaw Pact, as any conflict between the two alliances was seen as having the potential to quickly escalate into a nuclear total war, although the terrifying prospects of mutually assured destruction and potential civilizational catastrophe somehow deterred such escalation. Nevertheless, the nuclear arms race between the United States and the Soviet Union and subsequent proliferation of such weapons of mass destruction continue to have geostrategic repercussions even after the Cold War ended.

== Possible solutions ==
=== NATO policies preventing nuclear escalation ===
==== Background ====
The North Atlantic Treaty Organization (NATO) is an intergovernmental military alliance. Because three of its members (the United States, the United Kingdom, and France) are nuclear powers, the alliance also serves as a nuclear power. NATO was formed during the Cold War to provide security for its member states and assure mutual destruction with the Soviet Union (USSR). While three of NATO's member states are armed with nuclear weapons, the United States has the largest nuclear arsenal.

Though NATO had policies regarding the escalation surrounding nuclear war, they did not take effect until the late 1950s. This was because, while the Soviet Union lacked intercontinental ballistic missiles and other long-range missiles to threaten the United States directly, the U.S. had stationed missile launchers within European NATO member states. This gave the U.S. an advantage should nuclear war commence. After this period, however, the Soviet Union could amass a large enough atomic stockpile to target the U.S. effectively. As the U.S. would be met with a similar or more significant atomic threat than they posed to the Soviet Union, they introduced the NATO response policy of 'massive retaliation', which focused on the commitment to retaliate with a greater force than they had been attacked with.

Because of the geographical position of European nations, they would quickly become involved in any war between superpowers, even if it did not originate in Europe. Any possible conflict between members of the Warsaw Pact (led by the Soviet Union) and members of NATO (led by the United States) would likely escalate from conventional warfare to nuclear warfare. As most of Europe was involved in either NATO or the Warsaw Pact, they would be engulfed in any war that arose from a conflict between the two. This made European NATO member states a target if the Cold War escalated into a nuclear war.

==== Policies ====
NATO has several policies that are used to prevent nuclear escalation and nuclear war in NATO territory. The first policy, 'horizontal escalation', involves attempting to relocate the war to an area outside the European continent. The second policy, 'temporal escalation', consists of prolonging conventional warfare until neither side can continue the war effort, causing a stalemate. However, as seen in wars similar to World War II, wars can last several years and still involve nuclear weaponry. The third policy, 'surprise escalation', involves attempting to prevent the opposing nation from initiating a nuclear war.

In 1967, NATO also adopted the 'flexible response' policy, which had been recently developed by the United States. This policy enabled NATO to respond to any form of USSR aggression without relying on help from the U.S. until all forms of action were taken: battlefield, conventional, theater, and nuclear weapons. NATO reasoned that the U.S. still guaranteed strategic help should the USSR invade Europe; additionally, the U.S. would be forced to enter the conflict due to many of its international interests being jeopardized. However, European NATO members quickly let known the policy's great cost, something previously avoided during the 1950s proposal for a large NATO ground force.

Although NATO's standing forces were meager, the U.S. nuclear might was superior to the USSR's, creating the deterrence NATO sought at the time. To further increase deterrence, NATO adopted dual capable missile systems, which allowed for either a conventional payload or a nuclear one. This was done both for the simplicity of ordnance and as a sign to the USSR that they were prepared to use nuclear weapons given to them.

However, some Europeans contended that the intermediate steps of 'flexible response' were unnecessary. They believed that the 'massive retaliation' stance was the better course of action due to the immediacy of escalation. Following a USSR attack on Europe, 'massive retaliation' would guarantee U.S. involvement, redirecting from a small conflict to a war between the two superpowers. Doubts within the smaller NATO countries materialized when France renounced the past NATO ideology that saw the U.S. as a martyr willing to engulf itself in war for its European allies. This led to the creation of France's nuclear defense program, and France's withdraw from NATO's integrated military structure.

NATO had a good foundation of nuclear weapons provided by the U.S. and a small amount by Britain. In 1974, France developed the Pluton, a fully mobile tactical missile, and made it available to NATO. By 1981, over 30 Pluton units were deployed, with available reloads accompanying them throughout Europe. NATO also possessed nuclear-capable aircraft that could be used in multiple roles, nuclear and non-nuclear, within a conflict.

== See also ==
- Nuclear weapons debate
- Stability–instability paradox

== Works cited ==
- Sheehan, Michael (1983). The Arms Race. New York: St. Martin's.
- Cimbala, Stephen (1989). NATO Strategies and Nuclear Weapons. New York: St.Martin's. p. 1.
- Chant, Christopher; Hogg, Ian (1983). The Nuclear War File. London: Ebury Press. p. 44. ISBN 0-85223-380-9.
