= Special Liaison Unit =

A Special Liaison Unit (SLU) was a unit within the British military during the Second World War tasked with disseminating intelligence from the Ultra program in World War II to military commanders in the field.

== Origin ==
The breakthroughs at Bletchley Park in April 1940 when cryptographers succeeded in deciphering four small messages regarding Luftwaffe personnel led senior MI6 agent F. W. Winterbotham to consider how such decoded information would be handled once it became more plentiful. The Chief of MI6, Stewart Menzies, gave "permission to set up a completely new organisation for the translation, distribution and complete security of the decoded signals...". Winterbotham formed Special Liaison Units attached to each field headquarters that received Enigma.

The distribution of Ultra information to Allied commanders and units in the field involved considerable risk of discovery by the Germans, and great care was taken to control both the information and knowledge of how it was obtained. Liaison officers were appointed for each field command to manage and control dissemination. A key part of the solution was arranging for the secure delivery of information from Ultra to the various commanders, and making sure that they did nothing to give away the secret that Enigma was being read.

== Personnel ==
Dissemination of Ultra intelligence to field commanders was carried out by MI6, which operated Special Liaison Units (SLU) attached to major army and air force commands. Each SLU included intelligence, communications, and cryptographic elements.

An SLU consisted of a few RAF officers and enlisted men, low in rank to avoid drawing attention which made it difficult to award military decorations at the appropriate level. The communications element of each SLU was called a "Special Communications Unit" and was manned by army personnel.

The unit was headed by a British Army or RAF officer, usually a major, known as "Special Liaison Officer". The main function of the liaison officer or his deputy was to pass Ultra intelligence bulletins to the commander of the command he was attached to, or to other indoctrinated staff officers.

Technicians within the units were all at the sargeant level.

== Protocol ==
In order to safeguard Ultra, special precautions were taken. They received Ultra messages by radio from Britain, carefully encrypted in Britain's strongest cipher. The standard procedure was for the liaison officer to present the intelligence summary to the recipient, stay with him while he studied it, perhaps answer questions and then take it back and destroy it. Messages were to be kept under lock and key.

The commander was the usual recipient and often the only person cleared to know where the information came from, although at some HQs one or two deputies might also cleared. Ultra recipients were not allowed to transmit, repeat or refer Ultra signals. Ultra recipients were not allowed to voluntarily place themselves in a position where they could be captured, which could create friction with more active commanders.

In some large headquarters, there was a special security reading room.

== Progress ==
The first mobile SLUs appeared during the French campaign of 1940. An SLU supported the British Expeditionary Force (BEF) headed by General Lord Gort. The first liaison officers were Robert Gore-Browne and Humphrey Plowden. A second SLU of the 1940 period was attached to the RAF Advanced Air Striking Force at Meaux commanded by Air Vice-Marshal P H Lyon Playfair. This SLU was commanded by Squadron Leader F.W. "Tubby" Long.

Mobile SLUs were attached to field army and air force headquarters and depended on radio communications to receive intelligence summaries.

By the end of the war, there were about 40 SLUs serving commands around the world. Fixed SLUs existed at the Admiralty, the War Office, the Air Ministry, RAF Fighter Command, the US Strategic Air Forces in Europe (Wycombe Abbey) and other fixed headquarters in the UK. An SLU was operating at the War HQ in Valletta, Malta. These units had permanent teleprinter links to Bletchley Park.

== Special Security Office ==
The US Special Security Office (SSO) was based on the setup of SLUs.

== Bibliography ==
- Calvocoressi, Peter (1981). Top Secret Ultra. New York: Ballantine Books. pp. 85–86. ISBN 0-345-30069-6.
- Lewin, Ronald (1978). Ultra goes to war : the secret story. London: Hutchinson. ISBN 0-09-134420-4. OCLC 4808900.
- Stephenson, Charles (2004). The fortifications of Malta 1530–1945. Fortress. Vol. 16. Oxford, UK: Osprey Publishing. ISBN 1-84176-693-3.
- West, Nigel (1986), GCHQ: The Secret Wireless War, 1900–86, London: Weidenfeld and Nicolson, ISBN 978-0-297-78717-4
- Winterbotham, F.W. (1974). The Ultra Secret. Weidenfeld and Nicolson. ISBN 0-297-76832-8.
