= Tactical intelligence =

Tactical intelligence is one of the three basic and fundamental levels of intelligence that make up the actionability of Intelligence collected by the Intelligence field. The other two levels being Strategic intelligence and Operational intelligence.
