= Jason Healey =

American scholar of cybersecurity

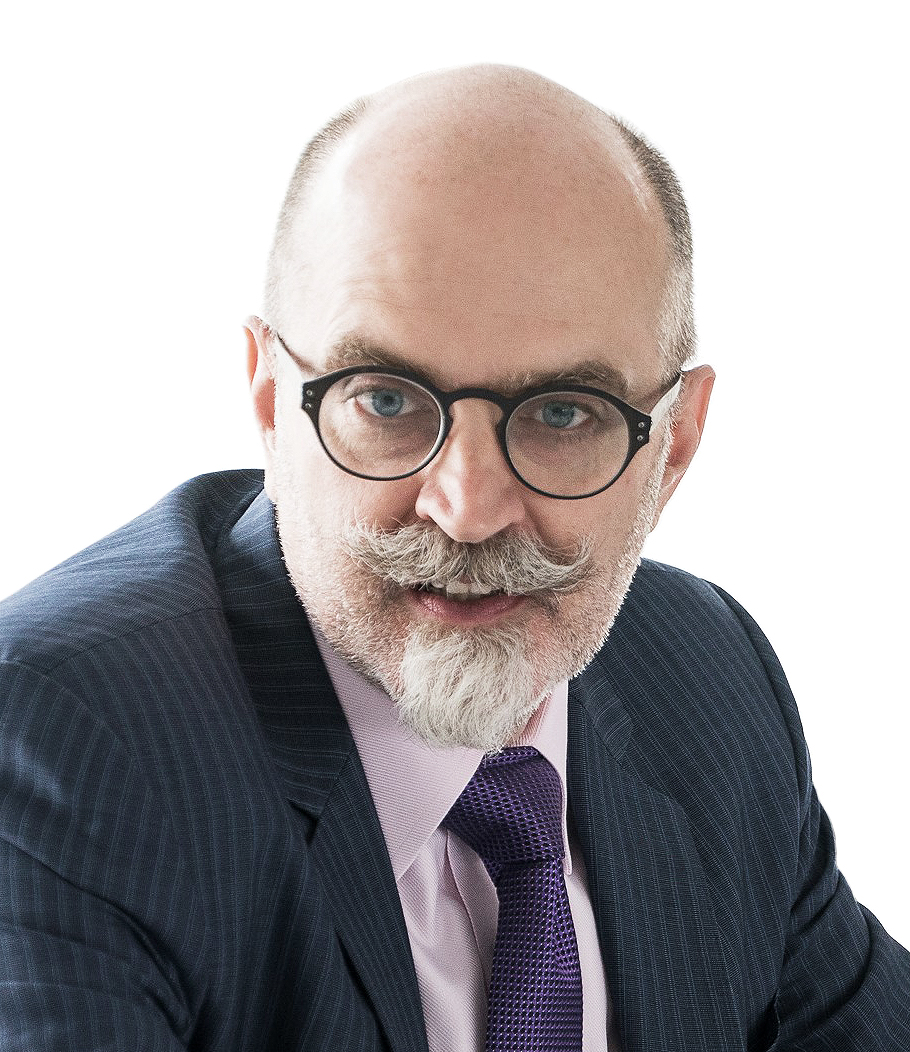
- Healey in June 2018
- Born: Rhode Island, U.S.
- Citizenship: United States
- Education: US Air Force Academy (BA); Johns Hopkins University (MA); James Madison University (MS)
- Occupations: Senior Research Scholar, Columbia SIPA
- Writing career
- Subjects: Cyber security Cyber policy
- Notable works: A Fierce Domain, Cyber Conflict 1986 to 2012; Cyber Security Policy Guidebook
- Website: twitter.com/Jason_Healey

Jason Healey is an American senior research scholar and adjunct professor at the School of International and Public Affairs, Columbia University. He is also a senior fellow with the Cyber Statecraft Initiative at the Atlantic Council, where he was the program's founding director. He has published many academic articles, essays, and books on the topic of cyber security and has advised on security measures for corporate, government, and military institutions. He has been identified as the first historian of cyber conflict.

== History ==
Healey was born and raised in Rhode Island, and at 17, joined the United States Air Force. He graduated from the United States Air Force Academy in 1991 and was commissioned as an officer. Initially trained as a fighter pilot, Healey transitioned to signals intelligence and in 1998, began working at The Pentagon, implementing a computer network defense system. During his Air Force career, Jason was awarded two Meritorious Service Medals for his contributions to cyber security. Healey later received a master's degree in Information Security from James Madison University.

== Work in cybersecurity and cyber policy ==
Healey's career has focused principally on cyber policy, its implementation, and addressing responses to security threats. In Hong Kong, as vice president at Goldman Sachs, he developed a crisis-response system to address incidents across Asia. He has also worked at The White House as the director for cyber infrastructure protection. He is currently a board member on the Cyber Conflict Studies Association and the Military Cyber Professionals Association. The extent of his work has led one magazine to refer to Healey as the first historian of cyber conflict.

Healey is a frequent public commentator and has written many articles on malware threats and cyber policy. Healey has discussed the potential advantages and disadvantages of the United States launching cyber-based attacks. In regards to such an offensive on Syria, he stated that "you no longer have to drop physical bombs and kill people... it can be targeted, non-lethal microforce", but surmised that due to past leaks of the United States' involvement in Stuxnet, government agencies may have decided against it. Healey has also commented on the Heartbleed bug, noting the discrepancy between the National Security Agency's stated priority of defense and its failure to expose the bug when it was found, and he said that the organization would be "shredded by the computer security community" for this failure. In 2013, Healey took a critical stance on the state of mass surveillance in the United States. He predicted that U.S. interests abroad would suffer "deep and long term damage" if the administration failed to find alternatives to spying conducted by the National Security Agency.

In 2012, Healey published the first comprehensive history of cyber-conflict, A Fierce Domain, Cyber Conflict 1986 to 2012, positing that confrontations within cyberspace have established a new kind of conflict, with new characteristics. He explores this development through historical studies, beginning with the KGB's 1986 hacking initiative to steal military plans from the U.S. in what is referred to as the Cuckoo's Egg Case. The book was positively reviewed and has been referred to as a "definitive historical record of cyber conflict."

In March 2014, Forbes identified Healey as one of twenty cyber policy experts to follow on Twitter.

== Publications ==
- Cyber Security Policy Guidebook (2012), co-author, published by John Wiley & Sons (ISBN 9781118241325)
- A Fierce Domain, Cyber Conflict 1986 to 2012 (2013), author, published by the Cyber Conflict Studies Association (ISBN 9780989327404)
