= Special Security Office =

US defense intelligence agency

The Special Security Office (SSO) is a function within multiple arms of the United States federal government and armed forces with the mission to provide a reliable and secure means to receive and disseminate Sensitive Compartmented Information (SCI) and Special Access Programs (SAP) to authorized recipients in the United States government and military organizations. In the military, they are administered by the National Security Agency or Defense Intelligence Agency depending on the command's mission.

Systematic handling of compartmented information probably is most associated with the Special Liaison Units (SLU) originally for the distribution of British Ultra COMINT. Cleared personnel in these units and the equivalent US Special Security Offices (SSO), usually brought material to indoctrinated recipients, perhaps waited to answer questions, and took back the material. In some large headquarters, there was a special security reading room.

== See also ==
- AFI 14-302, Control, Protection, and Dissemination of Sensitive Compartmented Information
- Joint Worldwide Intelligence Communications System
