= Battle lab =

A battle lab or battle laboratory is an organization dedicated to studying changes in the military.

It provides means (premises, teams, operational equipment or operational platforms, hardware, software, IT infrastructure, processes, guidelines) to analyze or assess impacts that could be induced by changes in a military realm. The changes can be of any kind: equipment, technologies, organization, doctrine or changes in the environment itself.

As in any other kind of laboratory, the analysis run in the lab is based on experiments. Since the capabilities to simulate a warfare environment, emulate systems or equipment, and model actors (including their interactions with other actors and their environment) are generally necessary to run such experiments, modeling and simulation is a major discipline required to operate a battle lab.

== Other definitions ==
The definition of a battle lab provided by the Distributed Networked Battle Labs (DNBL) operating model document is "A combination of test capabilities brought together with operational end-users for the purpose of operator training and/or development/enhancement of operational concepts and procedures."

Presagis defines battle labs as "A fairly new concept that allow for the virtual experimentation of new technology and solutions before they are fielded in battle. The goal is to test the latest in battlefield organization, tactics, doctrine, and technological capabilities to determine their potential value early on in the acquisition process - before significant investment has been made in their preparation and deployment. By using simulations or prototypes, the battle lab can cost-effectively evaluate battlefield performance of new technology or solutions."

The study "What are Battle Labs – Do We Still Need Them?" provides an academic view of the US battle labs in the early 2000s.

== Origins ==
The concept of a battle lab was born in the US army in the early 1990s. It was first introduced by the United States Army Training and Doctrine Command commander, General Frederick M. Franks Jr. as being a means to "quickly and thoroughly analyze both warfighting ideas and the means of warfare produced by emerging technologies."

== Method ==
The analysis performed by a battle lab consists primarily in forming hypotheses, then conducting experiments based on modeling and simulation, possibly including operational end-users. Battle labs are mostly used with a concept development and experimentation approach to support experimentation campaigns. The Guide for Understanding and Implementing Defense Experimentation (GUIDEx) is a reference in the domain.

== Mission ==
The mission of the United States Air Force Battlelab is to "rapidly identify and prove the worth of innovative ideas which improve the ability of the Air Force to execute its core competencies and Joint Warfighting.” The mission of the Mission Command Battle Lab (MCBL) at United States Army Combined Arms Center is to "[mitigate] risk to current and future Army forces by examining and evaluating emerging concepts and technologies through experimentation, studies, prototyping, and network integration, while simultaneously informing the combat development and acquisition processes."

Battle labs can be set to explore a specific topic (called an "ad hoc battle lab," generally with a limited life span and very specialized means and simulations) or can be set as a multi-purpose exploration capability (with unlimited life span, flexible and scalable means and simulations). Battle labs can be set by type of military forces (Air Forces, Naval Forces or Land Forces) or can be set across domains (Joint Forces, Combined lab). Battle labs can also be set for a military capability such as Command and Control. The list of US battle labs published by the US Air Force Air University illustrates the diversity of battle labs.

== Battle labs interconnection ==
The interconnection of battle labs requires connecting the networks, connecting deployed systems and sometimes sharing technical means (simulation capabilities, test and evaluation services). Such interconnection requires setting a framework shared by the different stakeholders.

For example, the NATO Distributed Networked Battle Labs (DNBL) have been created in order to tighten cooperation on preparation and conduct of Experimentation, Test and Evaluation (ET&E) events between the members of the framework. The DNBL Framework provides the operating model to enable the federated use of capabilities and systems for a wide range of user groups and to exchange ET&E services available in the DNBL Service Catalogue.
From the perspective of the simulation, a framework is dedicated to "distributed simulation" and simulation interoperability. The Simulation Interoperability Standards Organization develops standards and promotes modelling and simulation interoperability.
