= Conflict escalation =

Concept in conflict studies

Conflict escalation is the process by which conflicts grow in severity or scale over time. That may refer to conflicts between individuals or groups in interpersonal relationships, or it may refer to the escalation of hostilities in a political or military context. In systems theory, the process of conflict escalation is modeled by positive feedback. Conflict escalation can be modeled with game theory. In contrast, de-escalation are approaches which lead to a decrease or end of a conflict.

While the word escalation was used as early as in 1938, it was popularized during the Cold War by two important books: On Escalation (Herman Kahn, 1965) and Escalation and the Nuclear Option (Bernard Brodie, 1966). In those contexts, it especially referred to war between two major states with weapons of mass destruction during the Cold War.

Conflict escalation has a tactical role in military conflict and is often formalized with explicit rules of engagement. Highly-successful military tactics exploit a particular form of conflict escalation such as by controlling an opponent's reaction time, which allows the tactician to pursue or trap his opponent. Both Napoleon Bonaparte and Heinz Guderian advocated that approach. Sun Tzu elaborated it in a more abstract form and maintained that military strategy was about minimizing escalation and diplomacy was about eliminating it.

== Continuum of force ==
The United States Marine Corps' "Continuum of Force" (found in MCRP 3-02B) documents the stages of conflict escalation in combat for a typical subject:

=== Level 1: Compliant (cooperative) ===
The subject responds to and obeys verbal commands. He refrains from close combat.

=== Level 2: Resistant (passive) ===
The subject resists verbal commands but complies to commands immediately upon contact controls. He refrains from close combat.

=== Level 3: Resistant (active) ===
Initially, the subject physically resists commands, but he can be made to comply by compliance techniques, including come-along holds, soft-handed stunning blows, and techniques inducing pain by joint manipulation and pressure points.

=== Level 4: Assaultive (bodily harm) ===
The unarmed subject physically attacks his opponent. He can be controlled by certain defensive tactics, including blocks, strikes, kicks, enhanced pain compliance procedures, impact weapon blocks, and blows.

=== Level 5: Assaultive (lethal force) ===
The subject has a weapon and will likely kill or injure someone unless he is controlled. That is possible only by lethal force, which possibly requires firearms or weapons. This could also include the subject physically overpowering someone and choking them out, which will cause injury or death if sustained for a long period of time.

== International relations ==
Conflict escalation forecasts have been increasing in reliability. Asymmetric warfare can in some situations lead to persistent conflict escalation. A Fait accompli can result in rewards for short periods of conflict escalation. Appeasement can in some situations lead to conflict escalation. Overconfidence in escalation control can potentially lead to further conflict escalation including nuclear escalation.

== Escalation trap ==
The escalation trap is a cycle where small conflicts or behaviors intensify because each party involved continuously increases their response.

== See also ==
- Complex system approach to peace and armed conflict
- Conflict continuum
- Conflict management
- Escalation of commitment
- Friedrich Glasl's model of conflict escalation
- Stability–instability paradox
