= Unilateral disarmament =

Renunciation of weapons without reciprocation

Unilateral disarmament is a policy option, to renounce weapons without seeking equivalent concessions from one's actual or potential rivals. The term has been most commonly used in the twentieth century in the context of unilateral nuclear disarmament, a recurrent objective of peace movements in countries such as the United Kingdom.

Nations do not often choose to dismantle their entire military capability. Unilateral disarmament is usually sought in one technical competency, such as weapons of mass destruction. Non-violent political movements from that of Mahatma Gandhi to the Campaign for Nuclear Disarmament have recommended unilateral disarmament as a step toward world peace.

Unilateral nuclear disarmament could happen were a series of cascading failures to occur. For example, loss of expertise, inability to finance, recapitalize and maintain the existing nuclear capability. Procrastination and neglect of existing nuclear weapon platforms and infrastructure to such an extent that a nation is unable to reconstitute its nuclear capability, and thus deterrence, in time before portions of the system(s) begin to break down.

== By country ==
=== Costa Rica ===
The only recent candidate for having performed an act of complete disarmament is Costa Rica, which unilaterally disarmed and demilitarized itself in 1948, writing its non-military status into its constitution in 1949. In a public ceremony to mark the occasion, the existing Commander-in-Chief handed the keys to Army HQ to the Minister of Education, for use as a school. Since that time, Costa Rica has been briefly invaded once, by Nicaragua, but has maintained its territorial integrity.

=== United States ===
Although former US President Richard Nixon expressly denounced unilateral disarmament in 1969, Nixon's unilateral discontinuation of biological weapons development in 1972 is often characterized as a "unilateral disarmament".

In 2017, George Ingram criticized the weakening of development budgets and other diplomatic efforts that can help avoid or end conflicts as a unilateral disarmament of a useful tool to advance US interests.

In 2025, Joel Simon writing in the Columbia Journalism Review called the dismantling of the United States Agency for Global Media a unilateral disarmament in the global information war.

=== South Africa ===
South Africa voluntarily gave up its nuclear weapons programme after the end of apartheid.

=== Belarus, Kazakhstan and Ukraine ===
Belarus, Kazakhstan and Ukraine inherited nuclear weapons from the Soviet Union that were deployed in their territories. The three countries voluntarily gave up the weapons in 1996 after the Russian Federation, the United Kingdom and the United States assured these three countries that they will not threaten or use military force or economic coercion against them through the Budapest Memorandum on Security Assurances. Russia broke the assurance by annexing Crimea from Ukraine in 2014 and launching a full-scale invasion of Ukraine in 2022.
