= Horizontal escalation =

Geopolitical process

Horizontal escalation is when a conflict becomes more intense by spreading to new geographic areas or involving additional countries. This can occur through military operations, diplomatic actions, economic pressure, or information campaigns. It differs from vertical escalation, which intensifies the conflict within the same geographic area or theater by increasing the scale, severity, or methods of warfare such as introducing more destructive weapons, expanding target sets, or raising the level of force employed.

During the Cold War, conflicts often involved many countries and regions, making escalation riskier. Counterinsurgency and counter-terrorism operations could lead to horizontal escalation because expanding the conflict area was a way to remove enemy bases or punish supporters of the enemy. In 1980, the Reagan administration considered spreading tensions to additional countries as a way to pressure the Warsaw Pact without using nuclear weapons. This is an example of horizontal escalation because the goal was to expand the conflict's reach rather than introduce new weapons.

In the context of great power competition in the 2020s, horizontal escalation has emerged as a concept in tensions surrounding Taiwan. As the US has maintained a military posture in the Western Pacific (e.g. deploying a rotating presence of US military personnel in Taiwan), China has pursued countermeasures across other theaters. Its supply of dual-use materials to Iran, including precursor chemicals for solid-fuel missile production documented by the Atlantic Council, has been characterised as consistent with a horizontal escalation strategy designed to increase the cost of maintaining US forces in the Middle East and erode US capacity to project power across the Pacific.

== See also ==
- Conflict escalation
